= Control Abortion Referral Service =

Organization that existed in 1970s-80s

Control Abortion Referral Service was a feminist Australian organisation active from 1973 through the mid-1980s that advised and supported women seeking abortion from New South Wales, other Australian states and from abroad, particularly from New Zealand. It also developed new women-run abortion services.

== Origins – changing the law ==
The United Kingdom Abortion Act 1967 legalised abortion in Great Britain on certain grounds by registered practitioners and regulated the tax-paid provision of such medical practices. This UK act became the basis of the Australian Humane Society's Abortion Law Reform Associations (ALRA) which set up in each Australian state and territory over the next few years.

On 26 May 1969 the Victorian Menhennitt ruling in R v Davidson ruled that abortion might be lawful if necessary to protect the physical or mental health of the woman. It was the first ruling on the legality of abortion in any part of Australia. In contrast, the New South Wales (NSW) conservative Liberal Party Premier Robert Askin cracked down on illegal abortionists, and by the following year, NSW had a full time abortion squad of 27 police officers.

On 11 May 1970, police raided the Heatherbrae Clinic at Bondi, NSW. Women patients were taken for questioning and medical examinations and five staff members were charged with performing illegal abortions. On 28 October 1971 the Sydney Central Court jury found the five clinic staff not guilty. The presiding Judge Levine's ruling, based on the Victorian Menhennitt ruling, established that an abortion would be lawful in NSW if there was "any economic, social or medical ground or reason upon which a doctor could base an honest and reasonable belief that an abortion was required to avoid a serious danger to the pregnant woman's life or to her physical or mental health". That danger might arise at any time during the pregnancy. The Levine ruling's more liberal interpretation of the existing abortion laws thereby made abortions more accessible to NSW women, ending the era of backyard abortions, and opening the way to specialised day clinics offering medically safe abortions.

Almost coinciding with the Heatherbrae raid, the first Women's Liberation National Conference was held at Melbourne University 16–18 May 1970. A key outcome was an Australian national campaign on abortion. The first public meeting of coalition groups to change abortion laws in Australia was held at Sydney University the following week. The rapidly growing Sydney Women's Liberation Movement felt need for a reliable New South Wales clearing house for information on fertility planning and safe abortion services.

Among the first organisers around access to safe and legal abortions were Communist Party of Australia campaigners Joyce Stevens, and Gloria Garton. Following a successful "Women's Speak-Out for Abortion" event at Women's Liberation House in October 1972, Stevens, Robertson, Nola Cooper and other feminists launched a two day "Women's Commission" congress, bringing together 600 women of different backgrounds and politics. Many issues were discussed, including abortion access. The organisers then convened a march on June 30 through Sydney demanding repeal of abortion restrictions. This was followed by a Hyde Park rally, after which some feminist activists returned to Women's House and laid the groundwork for the establishment of the Control Abortion Referral Service.

In May 1973 the intensity of these issues nationally was indicated by PM Gough Whitlam's consideration of abortion law reform. The initial David McKenzie and Moss Cass private members bills failed, but in September 1973 a bill by Race Mathews and Don Chipp, originally a royal commission into sex and abortion, was broadened to a Royal Commission on Human Relationships. It was carried in a free vote 85 to 11 and the Royal Commission was established 21 August 1974. The three commissioners Justice Elizabeth Evatt (Chair), Archbishop Felix Arnott and journalist Anne Deveson presented their final report in November 1977. This investigation originating from the abortion reform debate, it became "one of the most explosive and controversial social inquiries in Australia's history." Nearly three years later, in May 1977 Control was one of the many groups Australia-wide to make a submission on the quality of abortion services to the Commission, a submission signed by six Control workers who had recently resigned en groupe from the staff of then-leading abortion provider Population Services International (PSI) to protest the poor quality of conditions provided to women patients at its clinics.

== Control's early years ==
Launched July 1973, the Control collective provided advice for women seeking pregnancy testing and safe and affordable options for pregnancy termination. Volunteer counsellors based at Sydney Women's Liberation House responded to inquiries both by phone and in person, 6-9pm, Monday to Friday.

In August 1973, Joyce Stevens Lyndall Ryan, Betty Pybus and other Control members sought funding for a women's community health centre under the newly established Labor Whitlam government Community Health Program (Innovative Projects Program). Control registered a new company, The Women's Health and Resources Foundation and submitted an annual budget of $A55,000. This was approved by the ministry, much to the women's surprise. Control activists sought for premises and staff and the Leichhardt Women's Community Health Centre (LCWHC) opened in January 1974 as Australia's first women's health centre. It was formally launched on International Women's Day 8 March 1974.

Control had from the start pressed for LCWHC to provide outpatient abortion services. The first LCWHC administrator, Judy McClean and the first doctor Stephania Seidlecki asked the hospital if LCWC "could refer any women to them if something went wrong, and they agreed it was a good idea. They supported Leichhardt because it cut down the number of women to be referred to them. We did abortions one or two days a week, 8-10 women a day." However given the public fracas about publicly funded abortion services, LCWHC did not comment on whether it was doing abortions

Seidlecki later wrote: "Leichhardt was only a small centre. Its significance lay in what its stood for, not what it was. It changed the abortion environment in NSW and it was 'woman centred'. It also broke established conventions: it was a salaried service, it taught women to become familiar with their own bodies, and broke down professional barriers between staff."

Joyce Stevens, Betty Pybus and others in the Control collective, then secured additional federal funding for a second women's health centre, the Liverpool Women's Health Centre (LWHC) which opened on 21 April 1975, with first (short-duration) administrator Betty Pybus. Liverpool initially performed some early term abortions as part of its overall services. In the changed political climate following the November 1975 dismissal of Prime Minister Gough Whitlam of the Australian Labor Party (ALP), and in the midst of a public health crisis caused by a NSW doctor's strike the police raided the Liverpool Women's Health Centre, arresting a woman doctor on the charge of conducting an illegal abortion on a minor and a counsellor on the charge of aiding and abetting a crime. The charges were dropped 18 months later when the NSW Attorney General ruled a "no-bill."

Control relocated in July 1976 along with Women's Liberation House to new premises in Chippendale, purchased with funds provided by the women's liberation movement.

== Growth of free-standing abortion services in NSW ==
In this post-Levine ruling era, new free-standing clinics not attached to or dependent upon hospitals began opening in Sydney and the price of abortion with private practitioners dropped from $350 to under $120. However as access became easier, the anti-abortion activities also increased. With the public controversy arising over the public funding of abortion, LCWHC stopped doing abortions following the opening of Preterm Foundation in June 1974.

Preterm Foundation in Surrey Hills was the first legal abortion clinic to operate in NSW. Preterm did 80–100 early terminations per week under local anaesthetic, charging $90 (with $56 reimbursed via Medibank). Preterm was inspired by Dr Ian Edwards, modelled on USA services and supported and privately bankrolled by media magnate and Liberal Party politician Clyde Packer, Australia Party founder Gordon Barton and barrister Country Party politician Geoffrey Keighley. Dr Dorothy Nolan was the first Preterm medical director. Newcastle gynaecologist Dr Lachlan Lang trained Preterm and LCWHC doctors in no-touch vacuum extraction technique under local anaesthetic. Preterm finally closed in 2015. Siedlecki claimed that "Preterm was a model for the feminist centres Bessie Smyth Foundation and Control's Darling Street Women's Health Centre", which both opened in the late 1970s. Feminist clinic workers disagreed with this claim, given the non-hierarchical structure and work practices of collectives.

In March 1975 Population Services International (Australasia) (PSI) opened a clinic in Arncliffe, Sydney, which did abortions up to 20 weeks LMP, under general anesthetic. In April 1975, PSI opened a smaller clinic in Challis Avenue, Potts Point, Sydney. They carried out well over 150 abortions per week in 1975. Whilst other private doctors also provided late term abortions under general anaesthetic, their practices were smaller and their reputations affected by their having practiced in the 1960s, prior to the partial decriminalization of abortion in NSW as per the Levine ruling.

PSI Director Dr Geoffrey Davis, who had also practiced in Sydney in the 1960s, made a concerted effort to recruit feminist staff, seeking to leverage the referral power of the growing women's health movement. Margaret Hooks, an activist in the Sydney WLM movement and volunteer at the Leichardt Women's Health Centre and with Control, was the first non-medical staff member hired directly by Davis to become lead counselor at the PSI clinics in Sydney.

In 1972, the Queensland Abortion Law Reform Association in Brisbane was renamed Children By Choice (CBC) and began referring women to interstate for abortion, given Queensland's very restrictive abortion laws. By early 1975 CBC was referring about 50 women a week to the St Ann's Private Hospital in Killara. Then, in February–March 1975 the new PSI service negotiated with CBC and won most of these referrals.

On 6 March 1975, Davis wrote a signed letter to PSI international headquarters, including the words: "Rader Rollen fur den Zeig, as we used to remark while warming ourselves round the burning Reichstag. This week we crushed St Annes [sic]; next week Preterm."

On 7 April 1975, four weeks after Davis wrote this letter, Preterm burnt down, just one year after it opened. The fire burned for 4–5 hours but the causes of the fire started were not established by the police. Davis was allegedly one of the first on the scene. The Commonwealth Family Planning Program with approval from NSW government provided $80,000 for Preterm's re-establishment. Preterm Director Dorothy Nolan had "darker suspicions". She told the Sydney Morning Herald that a doctor "who had run a lucrative abortion business in Arncliffe" had been making repeated threatening phone calls to her home. PSI was the only abortion clinic in Arncliffe at that time. Preterm continued to provide women abortion, temporarily moving to St Ann's Hospital in Killara.

With almost all CBC clients traveling to PSl on two regular Ansett flights, PSI's client numbers had increased to well over 300 women per week and the yearly cost of abortion to Queensland women had reached almost a million dollars by December 1975.

Partly in response to the rapid growth of PSI, on 11 September 1975 feminist activists including Judy McLean, Jeannie Rudd, Margaret Hooks, Wendy Bacon and others attended a meeting to discuss setting up a feminist abortion clinic in Sydney. As a result of that meeting, the first of two Sydney feminist abortion clinics, the Bessie Smyth Foundation, opened around 18 months later.

Over this same time period there were months of confrontations between PSI staff and management over medical and counselling practices. Representatives from Control, the Leichhardt and Liverpool women's health centres, Family Planning and women's liberation movement health workers met in May 1976 and decided to mobilise against PSI practices, scaling back and then ultimately halting referrals of women to PSI for termination of pregnancies.

== Game on: Our Bodies, Their Power ==
By late 1976–77 the demand for Control's part-time abortion referral service had waned as PSI dominated the market and information was more accessible via the women's health services. But in December 1976, six PSI feminist staff members resigned in protest over practices at the company's clinics: Margaret Hooks, Rosie Elliott, Kris Melmouth, Margaret Taylor, Libby Waddy and Lyn Syme.

Newly resigned PSI staff members Margaret Hooks, Rosie Elliott, Kris Melmouth, plus Control member Lynne Hutton-Williams, reasoned they could not criticise PSI services without developing alternatives, particularly for women seeking second trimester abortions or abortion under general anaesthetic. The group therefore approached the Control collective to help it vet and work with abortion doctors in the greater Sydney area using criteria that included their willingness to incorporate counselling as an essential part of their services. Key PSI activist Margaret Hooks noted in her diary at the time that she felt "so helpless against the mammoth task we have set ourselves, taking on an industry backed by multi-nationals, the state criminal world - how dare we be so presumptuous." Some of the former PSI staff also served as additional Control staff so the service could continue to provide information, plus counselling and on site accompaniment on a full-time basis, particularly as required by those women seeking general anaesthetics and later stage abortions.

From March–June 1977 a group of the women, including the former PSI workers and other Control volunteers, wrote a detailed twelve page pamphlet titled Abortion: Our Bodies, Their Power, detailing the many issues of concern about PSI Australasia practices. Planned publication by the National Times proved complex and instead the pamphlet was widely distributed beginning in June 1977, and numerous media interviews were undertaken. Control was subsequently sued for libel by Dr Davis. The libel suit was later dropped.

By April 1977, the original, older Control collective members had all but one moved on, and the former PSI health workers conducted a Control-hosted counsellor training course for additional counselling staff. This raised Control's staff to seven: Lynne Hutton Williams, Rosie Elliott, Jenny King, Sue Powell, Jacqui Robertson, Margaret Sutherland and Louise Templeman. More were to join as referrals increased and some counsellors were placed directly in the private surgeries of select abortion practitioners. Former resigning PSI worker and activist Dr Margaret Taylor started work at the new Liverpool Women's Health Centre and Margaret Hooks left Australia for the UK in late 1977.

In September 1977 Preterm sacked a number of its research staff, leading Sydney's feminist movement to abandon its previous support of Preterm, with an article in the feminist paper Mabel calling for a boycott of the clinic and throwing support to the recently established feminist Bessie Smyth Foundation clinic. For Control however, the main issue was supporting the needs of women who were more than ten weeks pregnant and/or requiring a general anesthetic.

Until late 1977, the Control staff were volunteers, mostly working full time and mostly supporting themselves on social welfare benefits. By late 1977, with most staff working full time and well beyond, Control was able to pay small amounts to staff derived and shared from the hourly rate charged for counsellors who worked for clinics. Control also purchased a transporter van to pick up interstate and international women from the airport.

== Interstate and international abortion services ==
Overall, between ACT, NZ, Queensland, about a quarter of abortions in NSW were from outside the state in the later 1970s and early 1980s. Such was the increase in referrals, that Control needed to move from Women's Liberation House and relocated to new premises above the Dymmocks Bookstore at 424 George Street in Sydney.

Queensland: Control's relationship with Children By Choice remained difficult as CBC maintained a close relationship with PSI. Some Brisbane women set up a Control feminist pregnancy advisory and abortion referral centre in Brisbane in October 1977 which referred women to the two Sydney feminist clinics, not PSI.

During 1978, Sydney and Brisbane Control women worked together to establish a local anaesthetic clinic at the NSW–QLD border town of Tweed Heads, to which they hoped to refer most of the Queensland women. To avoid Tweed Council political storms in the establishment phase, this was kept secret. Sydney Control members had negotiated with a Sydney medical entrepreneur to establish the clinic in return for making it a best practice service. Beryl Holmes, co-founder of CBC wrote: "Consequently, when Children by Choice was approached by the (Tweed Heads) doctor for referrals, they reacted in their usual manner to such offers: that is, if the facility proved to be satisfactory, they would refer to it. They were unaware that the doctor was attempting to by-pass Control. By the time the situation was clarified, the clinic at Tweed Heads was ready to open, although it did not meet the feminist counsellor requirements. CBC felt that women should not be involved in the extra expense of going to Sydney because of ideological differences between the two groups. Because they believed that women should make their choice of where to go for abortion, they decided to tell the women of this clinic and of its strengths and weaknesses. It was a difficult period within the women's movement." The clinic closed within weeks. Control women did not document their own response to this serious failure.

New Zealand: The Auckland Medical Aid Centre (AMAC) was the first abortion clinic in New Zealand. It opened in 1974 and by 1975 had seen 4,005 women. The New Zealand Police raided AMAC in 1974, leading to the prosecution and acquittal of one of its doctors, Jim Woolnough, and the resulting Hospitals Amendment Act 1975 limited abortion to licensed hospital, forcing AMAC to close for some months. The NZ Parliament also set up a royal commission to consider the Act, along with contraception and sterilisation. Access to abortion became more difficult and NZ women started coming to Australia for terminations. By May 1977, Air New Zealand became caught up in the drama, being accused of running an abortion referral agency.

On 15 December 1977 the New Zealand Contraception, Sterilisation, and Abortion Act passed in NZ Parliament by 40–26 vote. The NZ Sisters Overseas Service (SOS) sprang into action, to assist NZ women forced to come to Australia for an abortion. Most came to Sydney. These referrals were initially almost captured by PSI, but (it may be that) interventions by Family Planning Association and the women's health services prevented this outcome. Instead and SOS worked closely with Control, who recruited an NZ woman, Rachel Parsons, as a full time Control member to help and monitor the process. Control workers picked up and dropped off New Zealand women from the airport, took them to hotels and clinics and tried to attend to all issues arising, sometimes even opening night clinics to manage big lists after plane cancellations. SOS figures from January 1978 from the major Australian clinics indicated that at least 16 New Zealand women a day were having abortions. Women were advised to raise (at least) $510 for all costs and one in ten women needed financial help. By 1979 changes to the NZ 1977 Act made it more workable, and facilities offering abortions began to open locally. By 1981 flights to Australia virtually ceased.

Australian Capital Territory (ACT): ACT women also had restricted abortion access to abortion services, as the Canberra Hospital had limited bed space. Many ACT women were therefore referred to Sydney. Over Christmas 1976 the ACT Right to Life discovered PSI Director Dr Geoff Davis had leased Canberra clinic premises and was seeking staff through the Commonwealth Employment Service. Their protests lead to establishment of a Parliamentary Standing Committee of Inquiry to investigate abortion in the ACT. This inquiry caused difficulties for all, as on 6 May 1977 Control former PSI staff testified privately to the ACT Legislative Assembly standing committee against PSI practices, arguing an ACT free standing clinic was needed, but not run by PSI. Likewise, so did the anti-abortionist Right to Life supporting ACT parliamentarians, who also agitated against the PSI expansion, providing detailed evidence of PSI financial transactions. In the end, the Parliamentary Standing Committee recommended no ACT freestanding clinics, that the Menhennitt ruling should apply and there should be a separate clinic in the hospital grounds for abortions up to 11 weeks with obligatory counselling one week before hand.

== The Bessie Smyth Foundation feminist abortion clinic ==
In 1977, Leichhardt Women's Community Health Centre established the Bessie Smyth Foundation counselling and abortion facility (often called the Powell St Clinic) in the Western Sydney suburb of Homebush.

Bessie was the first fully feminist run abortion clinic. Delivered in a setting intended to be homely rather than clinical, it provided abortions up to 12 weeks pregnant under local anaesthetic for $120. The first workers included Senior RN Anna Sheahan, Dorothy Colless, Jeannie Rudd and Terri Jackson. The second worker intake three months later included Gail Hewison.

Bessie was described as "the standard-setting Sydney feminist abortion centre" where counselling and democratic work practices were the key. The feminist Bessie and Control collectives worked closely together over many years.

== Darling St. Women's Centre feminist abortion clinic ==
Over 1977–78 the Control collective expanded to include 17 staff, between part- and full-time employees, and by January 1979 it had opened its own feminist clinic in Darling Street, Balmain, the second Sydney clinic run for women and by women.

The new Darling St. clinic performed abortions up to 14 weeks, using local or general anaesthetic, at competitive pricing. It operated five days per week including night sessions, with five collective members usually on duty - one in the surgery, another at reception and 3–4 counsellors, who both provided pre-procedural counselling and post-procedural recovery services. By March, the Control clinic did about 50 abortions weekly and while continuing to refer many women to other Sydney clinics.

Like many of the very active social movement organisations at the time, Control did not leave many documented traces of its work. Women involved in abortion have always worked hard and kept silent, as it is women's business and many secrets have not been told. This includes the process and politics of collectives.

Over time the old Control name slowly morphed into The Darling St Women's Health Service. Many women worked with Control / Darling St over the years 1973–1984. Those working for the Service included many nurses, involved in overseeing non-medical staff, as well as doctor allies, which were mostly male.

== NSW abortion services 1980s onwards ==
Meanwhile, the Control abortion referral service had expanded beyond Sydney, opening affiliates in Adelaide and Brisbane. After feminist activists in Townsville, North Queensland, began organizing for the repeal of restrictive abortion laws and women's access to safe, legal abortions, two feminists who had previously worked as counsellors with Control Sydney and Control Brisbane spearheaded the opening in September 1979 of an abortion referral service modelled on Control and based in the Women's Information Center on the city's main street.

As the 1980s progressed and more liberal interpretation of abortion laws won through in Queensland, New Zealand and the ACT, as private hospitals and doctors increasingly performed abortions, and as information became more accessible, all the Sydney free standing standing clinics contracted and eventually closed. So did Control and the Darling St Women's Health Centre around 1984-85, leaving their accrued assets with the Leichhardt Women's Community Health Centre.

In 1983 professional misconduct charges were filed on Dr Geoffrey Davis under the Medical Practitioners Act 1938 and Medical Disciplinary Tribunal. Hearings ending 24 December 1986 with a not guilty finding. However, the Tribunal found "disturbing inconsistencies and conflicts with regard to Davis' activities" and that Dr Davis "was at too great pains from time to time to justify and explain his conduct to a state of near perfection." A year later Dr Davis resigned as Director of PSI Australia.

The Bessie Smyth Foundation owned and managed their Homebush clinic until August 2002 when the business and premises became financially non-viable. After 25 years providing 42,000 safe, affordable abortions and countless counseling and support services, plus training for health professionals and student placements, Bessie was sold to British multinational, Marie Stopes International. Ironically, the original UK Marie Stopes Foundation had been taken over (under direction of Dr Tim Black) by the European branch of Population Services International (PSI) in 1976, and re-founded as Marie Stopes International, trading from 2000–2020 as Marie Stopes Australia, then changing its name again in 2020 to MSI Reproductive Choices. With the funds from the sale of their Powell St. clinic, the Bessie Smyth Foundation continued to provide counselling and support services for destitute women. Their services ceased In 2008, although the foundation was retained in case the establishment of a new women's reproductive health service should be required at some future date.

In August 2015, Preterm closed down operations after 40 years, apparently the victim of high costs associated with maintaining its licensing and accreditation.

Information from a feminist perspective from 1990 to 2022 on can be found in Abortion Care is Health Care by Barbara Baird.

Throughout all these turbulent years, the Leichhardt Women's Community Health Centre and the Liverpool Women's Health Centre remain and flourish, both born out of the 1970s struggle for women's right to choose.
