= Jenny's Place =

Australian women's refuge

Jenny's Place (Women and Children's Refuge) was established in 1977 and was the first women's refuge in New South Wales' Newcastle region. The establishment of Jenny's Place was integral in the response to the recognised need for feminist housing and crisis services for women and children escaping domestic and family violence, part of the original New South Wales Refuge Movement. It was one of the earliest refuges to open following that of Elsie Refuge, Bonnie Women's Refuge and Marrickville Women's Refuge. Today, the refuge continues to operate as Jenny's Place Inc., and is a registered public benevolent charity.

== History ==
In 1977 a group of passionate women, including Marcia Chapman and Josephine Conway, established the refuge in a run down suburban cottage in Islington. The women approached Joy Cummings, the Lord Mayor of Newcastle at the time and a progressive politician who supported social reform, to obtain a building for a refuge. The Jenny's Place website provides the following description of the original refuge building;

An old, two-bedroom house in Newcastle region was retained, which the council charged a peppercorn rent of $1.00 per year. The kitchen was used as an office and we had numerous women and children not only sleeping in the bedrooms but on lounges and mattresses on the floor.

In 1988, Jenny's Place received a new, upgraded building for the purpose of the refuge and the refuge relocated.

Historically, the refuge was funded under the Commonwealth's Support Accommodation Assistance Program (SAAP). Under the SAAP act, the refuge was allocated ongoing funding, including $40,446 in 1980-81, $185,002 in 1985-1986, a one-off grant of $23,116 in 1992 and $1,230,707 in 2015-16, to assist with the ongoing running costs and payment of employees.

Jenny's Place was successful in tendering under the NSW government's 'Going Home Staying Home' reform agenda in 2014, securing funding for their Women and Children’s Supported Crisis Refuge, a Single Women’s Crisis Refuge, Supported Transitional Accommodation and Outreach Support Program. In 2017, the refuge received a crucial charitable grant which allowed for the renovation of the shelter's outdoor facilities and the installation of new children's play equipment.

In 2008, the shelter established the Jenny's Place Domestic Violence Resource Centre for women requiring non-accommodation support and contact services, funded solely by community support and donations. The service provides women who do not require accommodation with information on how to leave their situation safely, access to counselling and other support services. In September 2019, private funding provided to the resource centre by the Port Waratah Coal Services ran out. The resource centre has since been under threat of closure due to government refusal to allocate the necessary funding. For the 2019 and 2020 period, the government allocated Jenny's Place approximately $1.4 million in funding to support its specialist support services, including its refuge and outreach services, however this funding did not extend to the ongoing operation of the resource centre.

In 2015, Jenny's Place received a $9000 grant from the Equal Futures Project fundraiser. In 2020, the refuge was awarded a $5000 NIB Foundation 'Good Cause Grant'. Today, Jenny's Place receives state government funding through the Specialist Homelessness Services and continues to provides support and crisis accommodation to women and children escaping domestic violence through two refuges, and its outreach program which includes fifteen transitional properties and ten boarding houses.
