= Population Services International (Australasia) =

NGO providing contraception safe abortion services in New South Wales

Population Services International (Australasia) was an Australian based subsidiary of Population Services International. PSI Australasia operated as a not-for-profit corporation, continuously registered in Australia from mid-1973 to 1992, with the mission of providing contraception and abortion services.

== Founding ==
PSI Australasia’s founding Director was the Australian physician Geoffrey Davis, who in the 1960s had provided discreet early-stage pregnancy termination services from clinics he operated in the Sydney suburbs of Potts Point and Arncliffe. In 1971, abortion was partially legalised in New South Wales, following court rulings in the states of Victoria (R v Davidson, 1969) and New South Wales (R v Wald, 1971). Those rulings permitted abortion when a medical practitioner determined in good faith that failure to terminate a pregnancy posed a risk to a woman’s life or her physical or mental health.

After working in London in the late-1960s, Davis was hired as a Director of the PSI parent corporation in 1971. He was best known for his work the following year in Bangladesh, where he led an international team invited in by the Bangladeshi government to perform an estimated 200,000 abortions on women and girls who had systematically been raped by Pakistani soldiers during Bangladesh's 1971 war of national liberation.

By 1974, when Davis assumed the direction of PSI Australasia under the title PSI Project Director - Southeast Asia and Oceania, he had accumulated extensive experience in terminating first-trimester pregnancies via menstrual extraction (aka vacuum aspiration). He was also using a technique for speedily terminating second-trimester pregnancies that he had developed in Britain and deployed on an “industrial scale” in 1972 in Bangladesh.

An anesthetist by training, the Australian Medical Association reportedly would not allow Davis to publicize his association with PSI when the clinics were opened in Sydney and continued to identify himself as Director, International International Abortion and Training Centre. During the period that Davis served as director of PSI Australasia, he would come to be known, in particular by detractors, as the "abortion king" of Sydney.

== PSI Clinics ==
The first PSI clinics to open were in the Sydney inner suburbs of Potts Point and Arncliffe, the same neighborhoods where Davis had practiced privately in the 1960s. The Potts Point clinic served as the headquarters of PSI Australasia.

The new PSI clinics operated within the context of increasingly high demand from women across Australia and New Zealand for safe and legal abortion. Davis planned to meet the high-demand market opportunity with the quick-turnaround pregnancy termination procedures he had developed, delivering easily accessible, "high through-put" services, both by appointment or for "'walk-in clientele'... accepted for same-day treatment".

The Potts Point clinic opened at 25-27 Challis Avenue in March 1975 and mainly provided first-trimester abortions. The experience for women patients, as later described by Davis, included an optional interview, a medical exam "and theatre time would usually be three minutes... within 15 minutes of entering the theatre, most are back in the dressing room recovered from the anesthetic."

The second and larger clinic opened soon thereafter at 45-47 Forest Road in Arncliffe, in premises directly across the street and rented from the Rosslyn private hospital at 30 Forest Road, and was “equipped to deal with later-stage abortions". Adjacent to the clinic was a PSI-owned and operated pathology laboratory. The association with Rosslyn hospital was convenient for complications that might arise in the more difficult later-stage procedures, which could result in hospitalization.

From the outset, Davis hired feminists to staff both PSI clinics in an effort to offset his negative image within the Women’s Liberation Movement (WLM) in Sydney over what were seen as his “controversial” views on fertility control. He made a point of appearing at events supported by the women’s movement, including the April 1975 opening of the Liverpool Women’s Health Centre, and was approved to deliver a paper in June 1975 at the first National Conference on Abortion and Contraception at Sydney University, sponsored by the Women's Abortion Action Campaign - apparently after substantial internal debate among the organizers of the event. He also attempted to persuade PSI's lead counselor and WLM activist Margaret Hooks to distribute PSI promotional materials while attending the UN-sponsored first international World Conference on Women in Mexico City in 1975, but was rebuffed.

The services offered by the new PSI clinics differed in two substantial ways from services being delivered by existing abortion clinics, including its main competitor, Preterm Foundation. PSI offered much later-stage abortions, beyond the Preterm limitation of nine weeks' gestation, and PSI abortions were performed under general anesthetic, rather than the then-customary local anesthetic.

The system Davis had devised was intended to deliver “a technically perfect procedure in minimum time. The reason for speed was to shorten the period of anesthesia.”

== 1975 Preterm fire ==
In the early morning of April 7, 1975, a fire broke out on the ground floor of the premises housing Preterm Foundation. The fire burned for 4-5 hours, gutting the entire building, destroying the clinic and all its equipment. The police arson squad investigated and various possible causes were cited in the press, including accidental or spontaneous combustion of refuse in the warehouse on the ground floor of the building. Police never established a definitive cause of the fire.

But Preterm director Dorothy Nolan later indicated "darker suspicions", telling the Sydney Morning Herald newspaper that a doctor "who had run a lucrative abortion business in Arncliffe" had been making repeated threatening phone calls to her home. The only abortion clinic legally operating in Arncliffe at the time was run by PSI. Nolan said she always believed the unnamed doctor paid to have a fire set at her clinic because Preterm had been undercutting his business. "There was a strong suspicion but we never had proof," Nolan said.

Feminists working at the PSI clinics at the time later said that the "burning down and destruction of Preterm’s premises and equipment on April 7, 1975, enabled Davis’ newly formed PSI to capture a large portion of the market." The PSI workers singled out Davis, producing a copy of a letter he wrote on 6th March 1975 to superiors at PSI headquarters in North Carolina, referencing "warming ourselves round the burning Reichstag" and proclaiming: "This week we crushed St. Annes [sic]; next week - Preterm." They also noted Davis was said to have been “one of the first on the scene” on the morning of the Preterm fire.

== 1976 PSI staff resignations ==
In December 1976, after more than a year of staff confrontations with Davis and PSI management over questionable medical and counseling practices, PSI's profit-oriented “assembly line" treatment of patients, poor working conditions and arbitrary sackings of staff members, six feminist staffers from the Arncliffe and Potts Point clinics resigned from PSI in protest: Rosemary Elliott, Margaret Hooks, Kris Melmouth, Lyn Syme, Margaret Taylor M.D. and Elizabeth Waddy.

Vowing to expose the conditions at PSI and to work toward creating a feminist-controlled alternative through joining up with the feminist Control Abortion Referral Service collective, the former PSI staffers proceeded to lobby members of Parliament, gave media interviews and produced, published and distributed a pamphlet that was highly critical of PSI, titled ABORTION: OUR BODIES, THEIR POWER. On May 7, 1977 former PSI staff turned Control collective members Margaret Hooks and Rosemary Elliott gave evidence on conditions at PSI clinics to a public hearing on abortion held by the Standing Committee on Education and Health of the Legislative Assembly of the Australian Capital Territory (ACT). Joined by pro-abortion activist and Control collective member Lynne Hutton-Williams, in June 1977 the former PSI staffers submitted confidential testimony outlining conditions and practices at PSI clinics to the Royal Commission on Human Relationships.

In their testimony to the Royal Commission, the staffers who had resigned included a litany of complaints about conditions at PSI clinics, including: inadequate and cramped physical conditions for patients, long wait periods, no pelvic exams prior to abortions, lax sanitation and sterilization of equipment, absence of medical doctors on premises during patient recovery, inexperienced doctors on duty, lack of choice between local vs general anaesthetic, performance of two-stage second-trimester abortions in a single session, withholding of information from patients on complications such as a torn or perforated uterus, insufficient counseling and derogatory comments and deprecatory treatment of patients by medical staff.

== 1977-78 ACT parliamentary debate ==
Faced with the intention of Preterm Foundation to open a non-profit abortion clinic the Australian Capital Territory (ACT), PSI had begun planning in 1976 to open its own clinic in the ACT. At the same time, it was planning to open a clinic in Melbourne and had registered in Brisbane to perform those abortions legally permissible under the law in Queensland.

On 21 January 1977, it applied to the Commonwealth Employment Service to begin interviewing potential employees to staff the Phillip Medical Centre in the Canberra suburb of Phillip. It was estimated that the Phillip clinic would perform between 140-150 abortions per week.

Interviews were concluded by late-March and the employees were set to be hired, but the launch was put on hold after hostile legislators in the Australia Parliament heard testimony that PSI had not revealed that the Phillip center would provide abortion services. PSI was warned on two occasions by Health Minister Ralph Hunt not to proceed with establishment of the clinic until after the ACT Legislative committee on Health & Education could inquire into the matter. The ACT Legislative Assembly subsequently approved temporary legislation to ban for three months abortions in the ACT at any facility other than Canberra’s two public hospitals, while the ACT Health & Education was preparing its report.

During the parliamentary debate, Davis and other PSI board members were accused of "profiteering" from PSI's abortion business in Australia and a web of interconnected medical business and property holdings were denounced by hostile members of Parliament. The details of those business and property holdings were also in the possession of the six PSI staff who resigned in protest in December 1976 and were subsequently published in the pamphlet ABORTION: OUR BODIES, THEIR POWER.

Davis promised that PSI would make a detailed submission to the ACT Legislative committee and amid ongoing debate in Parliament, during which hostile members of Parliament accused Davis of having been responsible for an abortion clinic in the United Kingdom that was closed by the UK government, a claim Davis said was untrue.

When in July the ACT Legislative Assembly report recommended that no free-standing private abortion clinics be permitted in the capital territory, Davis said that PSI would not decide whether to proceed with opening the Phillip clinic until after full debate in the Assembly. After the conservative Liberal Party fended off a motion to permit a public referendum on whether or not to allow private abortion clinics in the ACT, the Assembly voted to permit abortion only in government-run hospitals and only up through the 11th week of pregnancy.

The Assembly effectively put an end to PSI's designs on extending its abortion services to the ACT, with Health Minister Hunt enacting restrictions on abortions in the territory in line with the Legislative Assembly's vote.

In November 1978, the parliamentary opposition Labor Party introduced a motion in Australia's Senate for a conscience vote that would have overruled Health Minister Hunt's restrictions on abortion. The ACT Right to Life Association vigorously lobbied against the motion and subsequently said it was designed to remove impediments to PSI's establishment of its abortion clinic in Phillip. The Labor motion was defeated in the Senate on a vote of 36 to 24.

== Attacks on clinics ==
In April 1978, arson was suspected by police in a fire that partially damaged three floors of the PSI clinic on Challis Avenue in Potts Point. Police said the fire began just before midnight among papers at the bottom of a stairwell and damaged the ground floor and two upper storeys.

The perpetrators were not apprehended but among groups indicated to police by PSI management as possible arson suspects was the Control Abortion Referral Service based in Sydney's Women's Liberation House, supported and partly staffed by some of the former PSI feminist healthworkers who had resigned from PSI in December 1976.

Also reportedly suspect was the Right to Life movement. One week after the fire at Potts Point, PSI's clinic on Forest Road in Arncliffe was targeted in a nine-hour demonstration by members of NSW Right to Life, who burnt a "bloodstained" medical coat outside the clinic.

In 1981, members of the Rockdale Council moved against the Arncliffe clinic over alleged violation of the council's zoning regulations, after receiving a petition from 300 local residents protesting the fact that abortions were performed at the clinic. Council members said the clinic was only registered as a medical consultancy licensed to provide minor surgery and that performing second semester abortions was not permitted under the zoning regulations.

They called on NSW Attorney General to investigate possible violations of Section 28 of the NSW Crimes Act against whoever advertised that abortions were being performed at the clinic. Three months later, the Council took further action against PSI, seeking a court order to enable it to inspect the Arncliffe clinic at any time without notice in order to ascertain whether or not abortions were being performed on the premises.

== Medical malpractice allegations ==
In 1982, charges were filed against Davis and PSI with the NSW Health Commission, claiming that Davis was guilty of professional misconduct in the cases of two women on whom he practiced two-stage, second-trimester abortions at the PSI Potts Point clinic over two separate days in mid-February 1982.

Both women alleged they had received inadequate prior counseling as to the potential risks involved in second-semester abortions and both complained that they had been given inadequate post-operative care - specifically, that Davis had abandoned the clinic premises shortly after the procedure and was unavailable for consultation when each of their situations worsened.

Both women suffered ruptured uteruses in the course of their procedures and both had to be rushed to the Royal Hospital for Women for further treatment. In the more severe of the two cases, the woman had suffered a ruptured uterus and was nevertheless fitted with an IUD advice at the clinic. Complaining of severe abdominal pains, she went into shock and was given a blood transfusion, before being rushed to the Royal Hospital, where a partial hysterectomy was performed and remnants of a 4.3cm foetal head left by Davis in her cervix had to be removed.

Misconduct charges were filed under the Medical Practitioners Act 1938 and hearings by a Medical Disciplinary Tribunal began in 1983. On appeal, Davis failed in his efforts to require one of the women to post an expensive bond to cover his and PSI's legal costs in the case. But, he did succeed in having the NSW Supreme Court order the recusal of one member of the Tribunal on grounds that as an honorary consulting surgeon and visiting general surgeon at the Royal Hospital, his judgment on the case was biased.

After a lengthy set of hearings involving the testimony of expert witnesses, the Tribunal ultimately found irregularities in the record keeping by PSI staff and "disturbing inconsistencies and conflicts with regard to Davis' activities", but ruled on Christmas eve, 24 December 1986, that Davis was not guilty of professional misconduct and dismissed the charges. In their final report, the Tribunal members appear to have gone out of their way to issue a caveat on their judgement, stating that they had "an uncomfortable feeling that Dr Davis was at too great pains from time to time to justify and explain his conduct to a state of near perfection."

== De-registration ==
In 1988, little more than a year after the close of the medical disciplinary case, Davis retired from practice at the age of 55 and resigned as Director of PSI Australasia, which was de-registered as a company in Australia on 8 December 1992.

During the 1990s, Davis continued to consult to private medical practices in Sydney.
