= Women's Liberation House (Sydney) =

Women's Liberation House, also known simply as Women's House, was the headquarters for the Women's Liberation Movement and epicentre for organizing around issues impacting women in Sydney and across Australia from the late-1960s through the 1990s.

== Founding ==
The Women's Liberation Movement in Sydney can be traced to 1969, when Australian and recently arrived American women began meeting in groups in the inner suburbs of Glebe and Balmain to discuss feminist and leftist political ideas arriving to Australia through contacts and publications with the Women's Liberation Movement in the United States.

In Glebe, the group of feminists included an American filmmaker, Martha Ansara, recently arrived from Boston via California, Australians Sandra Hawker, Margaret Elliot and another American, Coonie Sandford, the latter two recently returned to Sydney from the United States.

They decided to host a meeting to discuss Women's Liberation and at an anti-Vietnam demonstration on 15 December 1969 distributed a pamphlet they had prepared titled Only the Chains Have Changed to announce "inaugural" public meeting of Sydney Women's Liberation for 14 January 1970. The embryonic group of feminists in Glebe was the core of the collective responsible for setting up Women's Liberation House in 1970 at its first location at 67 Glebe Point Road, in a residential property made available by another early Sydney feminist, Barbara Levy.

The front room of the house was used as a meeting room for discussion, behind which was a periodicals room containing radical and feminist magazines and pamphlets, many from the United States and brought to Sydney's Women House by Martha Ansara and the other Americans.

Women's House quickly became the hub for information and organizing around radical and feminist issues and activism in Sydney. The House welcomed women of a variety of walks of life and left-wing political persuasions, including anarchist libertarians, communists and socialists, working-class and middle-class women, straight and lesbian, white, aboriginal and mixed-race women. All were invited to join the Women's Liberation Movement, to attend the meetings of other women's groups meeting there, or to participate in "consciousness-raising" sessions at which they could open up and share their personal experiences of being women.

The Glebe Point Road location was also where Sydney's first Women's Liberation newsletter, MeJane, was edited and composed by hand using dry-transfer Letraset typeface and graphical elements, then printed and distributed by volunteers throughout Sydney neighbourhoods. The first issue was launched in March 1971.

== 25 Alberta Street ==
By end-1971, some 16 different Women's Liberation groups had been formed across Sydney and the activities at Women's House had outgrown the Glebe Point Road premises.

In Spring 1972, members of the collective located suitable new premises in an old, two-story building at 25 Alberta Street, just south of Sydney's Hyde Park. Using proceeds from the March 1972 International Women's Day event to cover the rent, Women's House opened in its new location in May 1972.

Over the next four years, the Alberta Street location became the heartbeat of the women's movement in Sydney. It was the locus of activism for radical feminist women and organizations, a hub of activism attracting the likes of veteran campaigners Joyce Stevens, Mavis Robertson and Bessie Guthri, as well as young feminist university students, activists and aspiring muckraking journalists, like Wendy Bacon and Anne Summers.

Dozens of newly formed feminist activist groups worked from Women's House at 25 Alberta Street, including the Women's Abortion Action Campaign group, which in October 1972 organized a "Women's Speak Out for Abortion" meeting, gathering women at Women's House to talk about their own personal experiences with pregnancy termination.

During early 1973, meetings were held every Monday evening at Women's House to launch a “Women’s Commission” congress, to bring together in Sydney in March an estimated 600 women of a range of backgrounds and political affiliations across two days of discussion on a variety of issues of importance to feminists.

Immediately following a pro-abortion protest march through Sydney streets at end-June, Stevens and other organizers gathered activists at Women's House to plan the Control Abortion Referral Service collective, which launched in July and for the next four years operated on a part-time basis from Women's House, with counsellors helping women seeking contraception advice, pregnancy testing and safe and affordable options for pregnancy termination.

In addition to the Women's Abortion Action Campaign (WAAC), other established and ad-hoc activist groups organized a plethora of meetings and events from Women's House in the early years, including "Theory and Action" discussion groups, protests over treatment meted out to young women at the Parramatta Girls Taining School, an Alternative Trade Women's Union (ACTU) conference and establishment of a Women's Trade Union Action (WTUA) committee referral service at Women's House, providing advice on "job problems, inquiries about awards, wages, conditions, union rules, etc."

A landmark national Feminism/Socialism Conference in 1974 also was organized out of Sydney's Women's House, as was the National Conference on Abortion and Contraception that took place in Sydney on 14–15 June 1975.

== Regent Street, Chippendale ==
In March 1976, the Women's Liberation Movement announced that as the Alberta Street premises had become "too small for all the demands put on it," Women's House would be moving yet again, this time purchasing a newly renovated house near the Central Railway station, promising a large meeting room, several offices and a shopfront to better serve the feminist community. Women's House moved in July 1976 to the new premises at 62 Regent Street, at the corner of Redfern Road in Chippendale.

The Control Abortion Referral Service also relocated to the Chippendale premises. In early 1977 its waning part-time service was reinvigorated with the help of feminist healthworkers who had resigned in December 1976 in protest over conditions at two clinics run by Australia's largest abortion provider at the time, Population Services International.

Former PSI staffers Margaret Hooks, Rosemary Elliott, Dr. Margaret Taylor and others joined feminist reproductive-rights advocate Lynne Hutton-Williams in approaching the Control collective to help it vet abortion doctors in the greater Sydney area using criteria that included their willingness to incorporate counselling as an essential part of their services. They also increased Control's staffing so the referral service could provide full-time information and counselling, five days and three nights per week, to women seeking advice on abortion, pregnancy, single parent families and contraception. By 1977 Control had outgrown the Women's House premises and moved on the Dymmocks House, George St.

Women's House would remain at the new premises until 1987, with the collective providing space for feminist activists fighting against the conservative Liberal government's cuts to welfare benefits impacting services for women and children, WAAC extending its work on contraception and abortion services to immigrant and marginalized women, alternative union activism for women via the Working Women's Charter Campaign and efforts to rally and inform women to activism through the launch of Rouge, a national feminist newspaper produced at the Women's House premises.

By 1979, however, Women's House was facing financial issues, launching a call for more support and beginning a series of annual fetes to help raise money to keep the space operational. At the same time, priorities in the women's movement were clearly shifting and with Women's House the locus of planning activities for a second Sydney WLM conference, the theme of the conference was "What do we want and how do we get it?", speaking volumes about the transition the movement was experiencing.

After 1980 federal elections saw the conservative coalition government of Malcolm Fraser cling to a third term, the focus of organizing at women's House was squarely on mitigating high unemployment rates among women and the impact of ongoing budget cuts to social services. The emphasis was clear in the 1982 IWD theme settled on by organizers working out of Women's House: "Cuts to women's services, child care, health centres, refuges and attacks on women's right to abortion".

Campaigning against anti-abortion groups, the WAAC continuing to organize from the Regent Street premises. The centre also regularly hosted Socialist Lesbian group meetings and lent its space to "Women Behind Bars" for organizing around its "Empty Mulawa - No New Gaols" campaign.

The 1983 election of a Labor government under Bob Hawke held out promise of relief for the most vulnerable in society. But, Labor dropped protectionism in favour of globalization, deregulated banking and finance and restructured the role of trade unions, while failing to fully restore social services impacting women to their pre-Fraser levels.

Dislocations in the economy in the 1980s were accompanied by polarization of society and there was a strong backlash against progressive organizations and movements. Along with other progressive groups, in the mid-1980s Women's House became the target of far-right attacks, which included burglaries and theft of files, documents and mailing lists, as well as vandalism to the property's facade and threatening phone calls.

== Palace Street, Petersham ==
Dwindling support and the attacks took their toll and in 1988 Women's House moved from the Regent Street premises, working from temporary locations until it relocated to 63 Palace Street, Petersham in March 1989.

Over the next seven years, the WLM organized from the Petersham premises against efforts by Right to Life groups and hostile legislators to undermine abortion rights, mobilized to combat insecurity and violence against women, and continued to host talks and conferences at Women's House to educate women in the areas of Feminist Theory and Lesbian Studies.

== Bedford Street, Newtown ==
In 1997, after an accidental fire destroyed the Petersham premises, Women's House moved to premises at 43 Bedford Street in Newtown, with Lesbian Line, Women's Incest Survivor Network (WISN) and Lesbian Space Inc, sharing the new premises with WAAC and the Sydney Women's Liberation Newsletter.
