= Women's liberation movement in Oceania =

Feminist movement

The women's liberation movement in Oceania was a feminist movement that started in the late 1960s and continued through the early 1980s. Influenced by the movement which sought to make personal issues political and bring discussion of sexism into the political discourse in the United States and elsewhere, women in Australia and New Zealand began forming WLM groups in 1969 and 1970. Few organisations formed in the Pacific Islands, but both Fiji and Guam had women affiliated with the movement.

Quickly adherents spread throughout Australia and New Zealand. Their primary issue was autonomy for women in all spheres of life, including focus on child care centers, equal opportunity for and pay and employment, objectification of women, reproductive rights, sexuality and sexual abuse. Most importantly, they wanted a fundamental change in the way society perceived women. Rejecting that reforming existing laws would change women's place in society without an accompanying change in the thoughts about women, liberationists participated in public protests, published information on issues, and held meetings to organise lobbying efforts.

== Australia ==
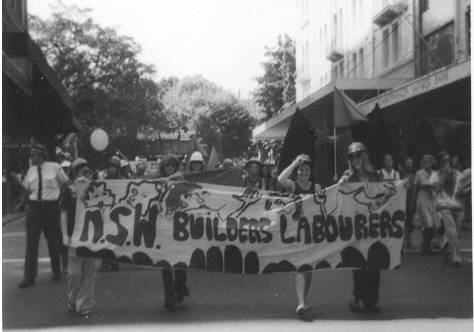
Female members of the NSW Branch of the Builders Labourers Federation, International Women's Day march Sydney, March 1975

The Regatta Hotel protest in 1965, which challenged the ban on women being served drinks in public bars in Queensland, is recognised as a defining moment in the women's liberation movement in Australia. In 1970 the law was changed to allow women to be served drinks in public bars in Queensland.

In 1969, Martha Ansara, who had relocated after a divorce from the United States that year to Sydney, joined with Margaret Eliot, Sandra Hawker, and Coonie Sandford to form a discussion group about materials on the Women's Liberation Movement that she had brought from the States. They decided to host a meeting on the topic and at an anti-Vietnam demonstration on 15 December 1969, distributed a pamphlet they had prepared titled Only the Chains Have Changed to announce the "inaugural" public meeting of Sydney Women's Liberation for 14 January 1970.

That same year, Warren Osmond, a tutor at the University of Adelaide had read about the protest over the Miss America Pageant and wrote an article in On Dit, the student newspaper drawing parallels with the university's "Miss Fresher" Pageant. In March 1970, a group of Adelaide Women's Liberation adherents picketed the contest. By May, the first nationwide conference on Women's Liberation, profiling "Female Conditioning" was organised in Melbourne, spreading the movement quickly across Australia.

After police raided the Heatherbrae Clinic, an abortion referral facility in 1970, the Sydney Women's Liberation group organised a protest in July and wrote about it in their newsletter. Throughout the September trial, they demonstrated at the court, advocating for legal abortion. The WLM organised a motorcade and petition drive for abortion in October. In January 1971, the Gay Liberation affiliate of the Sydney WLM was formed. Hungry for information on the theory and philosophy of the movement, such texts as, The Female Eunuch (1970) by Germaine Greer, an Australian-born woman living in Britain; Sexual Politics (1970) by American Kate Millett; The Dialectic of Sex (1970) by Canadian-American Shulamith Firestone; and Woman's Estate (1971) by British Juliet Mitchell became widely read and discussed. The mixture of texts from various countries as well as from different political backgrounds resulted in a commitment to collectivity and divergent ideas on how issues which involved women should be addressed.

Initially, men participated in the WLM in Australia, but in the period between 1970 and 1971, women began to oust men from their organisations because they tended to dominate the narrative and inform the women participants of how they should proceed. One of the earliest journals, MeJane, produced by the MeJane Collective of Sydney was founded in 1971 and produced by women like Suzanne Bellamy and Joyce Stevens. As in the US and other places where the movement flourished, small groups of consciousness-raising with a limited organisational structure were the norm and the focus was on changing societal perception rather than legislation. Prominent in the movement were women like Eva Cox, who would become a professor and social commentator; Justice Elizabeth Evatt, first chief justice of the Family Court of Australia; Eileen Haley of Adelaide; Anne Summers, who would write Damned Whores and God's Police in 1975, which became widely influential; Pat Turner, an aboriginal activist and civil servant; and Biff Ward, a writer and social activist.

In 1972, the Melbourne Women's Liberation set up a centre at 16 Little La Trobe Street which became a gathering place for members of the movement. They produced the Women's Liberation Newsletter on a gestetner and provided a community referral service to women. In the run-up to the elections that year, two of the WLM groups in Melbourne met to strategize over the federal candidates who might be favorable to women's issues. Out of these strategy sessions, the Women's Electoral Lobby (WEL) was founded and began lobbying the Australian Labor Party to address their concerns. When Labor won, with Gough Whitlam being elected Prime Minister, WEL began lobbying for the fulfillment of the promises made in exchange for their support. Whitlam appointed Elizabeth Reid as an advisor on women's affairs. The reaction from other liberationists was clear when a statement was issued in MeJane denouncing not only the illegitimacy of a man choosing a woman to be a spokesperson for women but of choosing a single person to represent diverse points of view. From that point, there was a fissure in the relationship of WLM and WEL.

Two groups formed in Tasmania in the early 1970s both from the women at the University of Tasmania. The Tasmanian University Union Women's Liberation group formed in 1971 and as one of their main initiatives worked to establish a much-needed Child Care Center for students on campus. The other group, the Hobart Women's Action Group (HWAG) formed in 1972 with members like Kay Daniels and her partner Shirley Castley. That same year they founded the widely-read journal Liberaction. Liberaction was intellectual but simultaneously irreverent and brought a different spin to WLM literature being produced in Australia. One example of the type of article it produced was their "Feminist Food Guide", which took on the stereotypes of women dining out without male companions. Public perception held that women without male escorts were not only not respectable, but incapable of ordering a meal or critiquing it. The members of HWAG visited various restaurants evaluating the atmosphere, the service, the prices and the food, reporting on their experiences. To those who complained that food was not a feminist issue, HWAG commented that they were missing the point that they were a group of women, dining out without children or men, had income and control of their own finances and were able to evaluate their treatment by businesses on their own.

In 1974, the Elsie Refuge, Australia's first women's shelter was established by Jennifer Dakers, Anne Summers, Carol Baker and other Sydney WLM activists, including Bessie Guthrie, Robyn Kemmis, Kris Melmouth, Margaret Power, Diana Beaton, Christina Gibbeson and Trudy Brickwood . Influenced by Erin Pizzey's book Scream Quietly or the Neighbours Will Hear, they approached the Church of England in Glebe, which owned many unoccupied properties in search of a suitable dwelling. When the church failed to respond, the activists selected two derelict houses on Westmoreland Street in Glebe and asserted squatter's rights over the properties after they had renovated them to make them habitable and opened to women and their children.

The 1975 International Women's Film Festival, which inspired women filmmakers around the country and empowered activists, helped build momentum for the movement.

Sybylla Press was established in 1976 and published all the feminist tracts of the WLM of Victoria, including Lesbian News, Scarlet Woman and Vashti, among others, until it ceased operations in 1988. That same year, the WLM of Canberra reported that in the six years since their group was formed they had established a meeting house; developed a Women's Centre on Lobelia Street which provided a referral service, abortion counseling and bookstore; a refuge house; and rape crisis center.

Though WLM groups were still functioning in 1979, factionalism in the women's movement and a perception by society at large that they were anti-male, had caused liberationists to withdraw from public demonstration to focus on issues such as education, family law, reproductive rights and employment discrimination.

=== Sydney ===
The Women's Liberation Movement (WLM) in Sydney began in 1969 with small meetings of women in Balmain and Glebe, as part of the explosive development of Women's Liberation politics and organisation that occurred internationally from the late 1960s and throughout the 1970s. The embryonic group of feminists in Glebe was the core of the collective responsible for setting up Women's Liberation House in 1970 at its first location at 67 Glebe Point Road, in a residential property made available by another early Sydney feminist, Barbara Levy.

Talking to each other about experiences previously regarded as belonging only in the domain of 'private life' — such as rape, domestic violence, incest, and abortion — gatherings of women at the Glebe Women's Liberation House and very soon elsewhere, discovered the commonality of these experiences. These collective conversations about such previously taboo subjects became known as 'Consciousness-raising' and one of the key political differences between older forms of political organising and the new liberation movement. The understanding of women's experiences as universal and systemic, rather than individual and idiosyncratic, became summarised as 'The Personal is Political' and one of the key insights of the Women's Liberation Movement.

By end-1971, some 16 different Women's Liberation groups had been formed across Sydney and the activities at Women's House had outgrown the Glebe Point Road premises. In Spring 1972, members of the collective located suitable new premises in an old, two-story building at 25 Alberta Street, just south of Sydney's Hyde Park. In July 1976, at the height of the Women's Liberation Movement in Sydney, Women's House moved again to 62 Regent Street, at the corner of Redfern Road in Chippendale.

== New Zealand ==
Influenced by the developments in the United States and Britain, women's liberation groups began to form in Wellington and Auckland in 1970, when Therese O'Connell started the Women's Liberation Front Club at Victoria University and Women for Equality emerged in Auckland. Some of their first actions were to invade the "males only" Bistro Bar at the Great Northern Hotel and demonstrate at the Miss New Zealand Beauty Pageant. Membership grew quickly, expanding to Dunedin, Christchurch and other areas in New Zealand. Subjects which had previously not been viewed as political, such as childcare, health, housework, and sexuality, became part of public debate as a result of the movement's drive to recognise that the "personal is political". In response to Women's Liberation demands, the government of New Zealand established the Society for Research on Women (SROW) in 1970 and hosted series of United Women's Conventions, which covered issues such as violence against women, women's health and abortion. This confirmed that the influence of the movement extended beyond those actively engaged in the WLM, as their aims were not to reform laws and make a place for women in society, but rather create fundamental change in the way women were perceived and society was organised.

In 1971, Ngahuia Te Awekotuku (Te Arawa-Tūhoe) and Sue Kedgley participated in a protest with other women from the University of Auckland, in Albert Park, to demonstrate the lack of progress for women with a mock funeral procession. Attracting wide media attention, the women were mocked but the coverage sparked a surge of interest and encouraged many women to become involved.

The Dunedin Collective for Woman formed in 1971 focusing on the issues of change in society's perception of women, access to child care, equal pay, and women's authority over their own bodies. The group functioned as an umbrella organisation for WLM groups around Dunedin to develop consciousness-raising cells, network with other groups, participate in collective protests, and produce materials on women's issues.

New Zealand Liberationists avoided hierarchical organisation striving for consensus among the membership, which was inclusive of all women. Adopting the "sisterhood is powerful" concept that all women were united in their oppression as women, liberationists membership included students, housewives, working women, as well as lesbians, Māori women and other Pacific Islanders. The broad spectrum of members created divisions and fissures began to erupt between socialist feminists, liberal feminists and liberationists.

In 1972, Kedgley and Sharyn Kay Cederman published Sexist Society, which examined the stereotypes of men and women's roles in society and marked her exit from liberationist ideals. That same year, Connie Purdue assisted in organising a New Zealand tour by Germaine Greer, a noted feminist from Australia. Te Awekotuku and other liberationists protested Greer's appearance, dressing as witches and calling attention to the exclusion of indigenous people, lesbians and undesirables from her welcome. Purdue's response was that Te Awekotuku had "set the movement back 50 years". Kedgley and Purdue, then turned away from radical ideals and formed the National Organisation for Women, based on the United States organisation and begin working on reform policies. In Wellington, the first National Women's Liberation Conference was held in April 1972. Attended by over 500 women and men, the agenda discussed equal opportunities in education and employment, lesbian and reproductive rights, childcare support and the launch of women's studies programmes in university. That same year, Anne Else co-founded Broadsheet with Sandra Coney, which would become the most prominent feminist journal in New Zealand. Among its editors were Coney, Claire-Louise McCurdy, and Pat Rosier.

As many members had children, quality child care was an issue and a focus of liberationist groups was to establish centers where women could meet and childcare was provided. The establishment in 1974 in Dunedin of a women's centre which shared space for a pre-school was typical. Liberationists also established bookstores and women's shelters to provide refuge for women in abusive situations. When they began, shelters in New Zealand created a "'parallel development' model that involved sharing power between Māori and ‘tauiwi’ (all people who arrived after Māori) in decision-making, use of funds, public presentations and staffing", but by 1973, Māori and lesbian groups began to separate themselves to focus on their different issues. One of these groups, first formed in Christchurch, was Sisters for Homophile Equality (SHE) which aimed to politicise the issues faced by women and gay liberationists. Because their issues had differences from mainstream WLM and from the men in the LGBT movement, SHE focused on the dual discrimination faced by its members. The organisation soon spread to Wellington, where the magazine The Circle was founded to allow lesbians from throughout the country to network and share ideas.

Radical feminist caucuses were held beginning in 1975 and fostered the development of a network which met between 1976 and 1978. The last three-day conference on the subject of women's liberation took place in Auckland in February 1978 and highlighted the various types of feminist views ranging from anarchy and socialism to racism and lesbianism. Some exchanges grew heated over whether women's oppression stemmed from class differences, racial differences, social differences, a combination of several issues, or were systemic. The divisions pointed to fractures which would eventually split feminists into groups focusing on specific interests. Liberationists continued to operate in New Zealand into the early 1980s, but as its early members moved on to other commitments, groups dispersed.

== Pacific Islands ==
In general, many women from the Pacific Islands, which includes some 20,000 islands lying between the Tropic of Cancer and Tropic of Capricorn did not identify with feminism which they thought of as a "Western philosophy", as in their cultures, women had defined positions of power. Women in the era often identified with the decolonialisation movement and saw their oppression in terms of having been colonised. Pockets of groups affiliated with Women's Liberation appeared in the region, such as a group which formed in Fiji, at the University of the South Pacific in 1971 and a cooperative Guam Women Unite formed that same year in Guam.

== Fiji Women's Rights Movement ==
The Fiji Women's Rights Movement was founded in 1986. "FWRM's goal is to improve women's domestic, social, legal, economic, health and political status in Fiji and to promote the equality of women in Fiji and in the Pacific Island Region." It was founded as an outcome of the Fiji Women's Crisis Center (FWCC), a group fighting for justice for women who have been abused.

== See also ==
- Women's liberation movement in Asia
- Women's liberation movement in Europe
- Women's liberation movement in North America
