= Biff Ward =

Australian writer, feminist, social activist

Elizabeth "Biff" Ward (born 1942) is an Australian-born writer, feminist, social activist, and author. She was one of the founding members of the Canberra Women's Liberation Group (CWL), and contributed to the group's activist efforts through theoretical debates and papers. Ward is also known for her non-fiction works, Father-Daughter Rape (1984), Three's Company (1992), In My Mother’s Hands (2013), and The Third Chopstick: Tracks Through the Vietnam War (2022).

== Early life and early career ==
Biff Ward was born in New South Wales, Australia, in 1942. She grew up in Australian National University housing in Canberra and had two siblings: an older sister, Alison, who died as a baby, and a younger brother, Mark. Her mother, Margaret Ward, experienced mental illness and abused Ward as a child. Ward's father, Russel Ward, was a vocal member of the Communist Party, and her family experienced anti-communist attacks, including rocks thrown at their house and nails put in their car tires.

In the early 1970’s, Ward attended some of her first women liberation meetings in Canberra in which she discovered her passion for feminism. Her earliest feminist writings are found in Mejane, a women's liberation newspaper.

== Activism ==
Biff Ward was one of the founding members of the Canberra Women’s Liberation Group. The Women’s Liberation Movement in Australia reached Canberra, Australia, in 1970, where the Canberra Women’s Liberation Group (CWL) was formed in June of that year. The CWL, which fluctuated between six and fifty members, began its activism through consistent meetings and by publishing the Women’s Liberation Newsletter in October 1970, which they used to advocate for women's rights issues for 5 years. From February 1972 to January 1975, their main base was the Women’s Liberation House on Bremer Street, Griffith, and this was where CWL activists like Ward helped secure a new Women’s Centre on Lobelia Street. This centre housed the Women’s Information Service, Abortion Counseling Service, a feminist bookshop, and office/meeting space for the Women’s Electoral Lobby (WEL), the Women’s Refuge, and the Rape Crisis Centre.

With the CWL, Biff Ward campaigned around issues such as housework, childcare, reproductive rights, and sexual violence, and they publicized this work through pamphlets and other printed materials. The CWL set up a printmaking workshop in the garage of their home office at the Women’s Liberation House in 1972. During 1972 and 1973, CWL members used it to print posters concerning women’s issues. Ward expressed that the CWL would have “these big screen-printing working bees … working really hard, printing, printing, printing. We’d print posters for meetings and public meetings, and maybe demonstrations.”

Ward’s primary activism lay in her contributions to theoretical debates within the CWL. In one 1974 meeting, Ward argued that women’s liberation was “not about gaining power” and that the CWL activists opposed the concentration of power in anyone’s hands, reflecting their skepticism toward hierarchical politics. In meetings in the early 1970s, CWL members discussed working for “two revolutions”, an external, socialist revolution and an internal revolution of personal and social relations, and Ward argued that the group was not seeking to gain power but to challenge the very idea of concentrated power. In 1975, at the Feminism-Anarchism conference in Canberra, Ward drafted a paper titled The Politics of Feminism which mapped the women’s movement across several spheres of activity and articulated an “anarchist–reformist” conception of revolution, stressing that “the means is the end” and that “getting there is living the revolution.” At the Marxist Feminist Conference in Sydney in 1977, she described the “initial exhilarating flush of feminism” as grounded in acceptance, support, personal change, and collective development, highlighting “sisterhood” as central to feminist practice.

Ward's writings also extended to documenting the benefits of communal living and community for children, as well as recognizing child sexual abuse, as part of broader feminist attempts to rethink domestic life. Writing in the feminist newspaper Mejane in 1972, Ward outlined plans for a commune she hoped to establish with fellow Canberra women’s liberationist Julia Ryan. In that article, Ward argued that raising children collectively could allow them to form independent relationships with their peers and with a wider range of adults, learn cooperation “from birth,” and gain “tremendous advantages” from being able to love and learn from “a lot of adults.” This idea would later gain traction in the 1980s, where Ward shares, "Undoubtedly the most important win in the 80s was that child sexual abuse was made public. It was put on the agenda by the women's movement."

Additionally, Ward's activism went beyond theoretical debates within the CWL. In 1983, Ward joined nearly 800 women in a two-week non-violent protest, known as the Pine Gap Women's Peace Camp, against the nuclear arms race and U.S. Military presence at the Pine Gap facility, and protested for the recognition of the Aboriginal sovereignty of Australia and their land located at Pine Gap. She shared, "Any form of political action in Central Australia against warfare, against the same forces, in an historical sense which took away the land from those people, must take the Aboriginal struggle into account. So land rights is integral to what we're doing." Ward served as the spokeswoman for the Women for Survival group, the group responsible for organizing the protest. Ward, alongside members of the Women for Survival group, organized meetings that helped build momentum for the protest, resulting in growing support and a turnout of over 800 people from all across Australia.

== Personal writings ==
=== Father-Daughter Rape (1984) ===
Father-Daughter Rape is a fiction book that documents the occurrence of sexual violence committed by a male parent on a female child. The story contains accounts of the maltreatment, the experience of the victim, and addresses the issue of childhood sexual abuse.

=== Three's Company (1992) ===
Three's Company is a narrative of three adults cohabiting, and it records their day-to-day lives and responsibilities that are shared among them. The text contains information on household organization, communication styles, and gender role separation.

=== In My Mother's Hand (2013) ===
In My Mother's Hands is an autobiography that includes memories of Ward's childhood and her experiences with her mother's abuse towards her family. The story involves information regarding the role of domestic chores, gender roles, and the role of a mother in controlling the state of affairs at home.

=== The Third Chopstick: Tracks Through the Vietnam War (2022) ===
The Third Chopstick: Tracks Through the Vietnam War is a nonfiction narrative about the author's relationship to the Vietnam War. There are accounts of displaced women, women in war conditions, and social systems that were torn apart in the war.
