= Susan Varga =

Australian writer and philanthropist (born 1943)

Susan Varga is an Australian writer and philanthropist who was born in Hungary in 1943.

== Biography ==
Susan Varga is one of the "most accomplished of Australia's second-generation, post-Holocaust autobiographers". Susan Varga is a Holocaust survivor who came to Australia at the age of five with her mother, stepfather and sister in 1948. Her biological father died in a Nazi Labour camp during the German occupation of Hungary in WWII. After the war her mother married a survivor who had lost his wife and two sons at Auschwitz. The family emigrated to Australia in 1949. Varga's stepfather was a successful businessman who started in the clothing business in Sydney. Married and divorced, Varga lived with her partner and writer Anne Coombs in the Southern Highlands of NSW. Anne Coombs died 23 December 2021.

Varga has written fiction, non-fiction and articles for newspapers and magazines.

== Education ==
Varga obtained a MA from the University of Sydney and later a law degree from the University of New South Wales.

== Philanthropy ==
After World War II Varga's parents built a new life in their adopted country. They started a clothing business out of a factory which they named Becher. When their daughter chose to invest her inheritance in a foundation to help those who, like her own family, have been forced into asylum, she and her partner Anne Coombs named it Becher.

Together with Anne Coombs and Helen McCue, Varga founded Rural Australians for Refugees (RAR) in 2001. In 2020 there are branches across Australia supporting and advocating for refugees and people seeking asylum.

== Activism ==
In 1974 Varga was one of a group of volunteers including Kay Ferrington, Joan Killorn, Betty Pybus and Edith Warburton who set up the Bonnie Women's Refuge at 260 Burns Road, Bonnyrigg in Sydney's South West. Nola Cooper, Christine Sykes and Diane Powell also played a crucial role. It was called Bonny's in line with the practice of naming women's refuges after women. The first women's refuge in New South Wales was called Elsie Refuge.

Bonnie Support Services was launched in 2014 on the 40th anniversary of the setting up of the Bonnie Women's Refuge. Varga wrote a poem, "Refuge", for the occasion. It concludes with the words, "By Women, For Women".

== Works ==
=== Books ===
- Heddy and Me, biography, Penguin, 1994
- Happy Families, fiction, Hodder Headline, 1999
- Broometime, non-fiction, by Susan Varga and Anne Coombs, Hodder Headline, 2001
- Headlong, fiction, University of Western Australia Publishing, 2009
- Rupture, poetry, University of Western Australia Publishing, 2016
- Hard Joy, Upswell Publishing, 2022

=== Journal articles and reviews ===
- Varga Susan. Twice the man, Sydney Morning Herald 9 August 2003
- Susan Varga. Fiction or Non Fiction? The Writer's Response to History; Address to the Sydney Institute, 1995
- Susan Varga, Opting Out, Griffith Review, 2007
- Susan Varga, Silence: Australian Jews and Israel, Griffith Review, 2011
- Susan Varga, From Three Women, article, Southerly, 1998
- Susan Varga, The Gift of Tongues, Griffith Review, (date to be supplied)
- Susan Varga, Broome's other pearls, article, Eureka Street, 2001
- Susan Varga, Summers' Time, The Bulletin with Newsweek, review, 1999
- Susan Varga, Masterly Tales. The Fig Tree, by Arnold Zable, review, 2002-2008
- Susan Varga, Dark Times, Griffith Review, article 2009
- Susan Varga, Culture by Custom, Griffith Review, 2014
- Susan Varga, Ann Coombs, Broome - Remote Frontier Town or the Future Shape of Australia? The Sydney Papers, article, 2001
- Susan Varga, Happy Families, Fact or Fiction, The Sydney Papers, 1981-1999
- Susan Varga, George Molnar; Politics and Passions of a Sydney Philosopher, Varga wrote one of a collection of memoirs, edited by Carlotta McIntosh, Beaujon Press, 2019
- Susan Varga, When I think of Budapest, Live Encounters, Free On Line Magazine from Village Earth

== Awards ==
Heddy and Me won the Fellowship of Australian Writers Christina Stead Award for biography in 1994, and was shortlisted for the 1995 Nita B Kibble Literary Award. It has been translated into German and Hungarian.

Headlong was shortlisted for the 2010 Barbara Jefferis Award.

Rupture, poetry, was commended in the 2016 Anne Elder Award.
