= Preterm Foundation =

Defunct family planning clinic in Sydney Australia

The Preterm Foundation was a pioneering not-for-profit family planning clinic in Sydney Australia from 1974 to 2015, offering women a comprehensive range of counseling, contraception and first-trimester pregnancy termination services.

== Founding ==
Preterm was the brainchild of Cronulla GP Ian Edwards, who in 1973 with his attorney brother Brian Edwards decided to set up a not-for-profit clinic to make affordable pregnancy termination freely available to women in the Sydney area.

The foundation was reportedly financed by loans or gifts from its supporters. Bridget Gilling, its president and an advocate of abortion law reform, was sent to have lent $1,000 to launch the clinic. Founding Board members included Australia Party founder and entrepreneur Gordon Barton, Forum magazine publisher Clyde Packer and barrister-businessman and renowned Anglo-Australian cricketer Geoffrey Keighley.

Its medical advisory panel included Rodney Shearman, a professor of Obstetrics and Gynaecology at Sydney University, J.D. Llewellyn-Jones, associate professor of Obstetrics and Gynaecology, and Charles Kerr, professor of Social and Preventive Medicine at the university.

Dr Dorothy Nolan, who was completing her obstetrics and gynaecology residency at Sutherland Hospital, agreed to become Preterm's clinical director. She said that while relieving pressure on Sydney's teaching hospitals by demand for abortions was a consideration, Preterm was primarily established to free women from the need to "shop around" for abortions and give them access to sympathetic counseling services.

About a week before Preterm opened, a suspected media leak fueled negative publicity highlighting a false claim that Preterm would offer "instant abortion on demand". Nolan later said she believed the press was "tipped off by a hostile doctor", angered that his fees were being undercut by Preterm's more affordable cost of around $50 for pregnancy termination.

== Procedures and services ==
Preterm opened on June 14, 1974, in large, sunny premises above a warehouse on the Parramatta Road in the Sydney suburb of Camperdown. Staff were busier than expected during the first week of operations, terminating 50 first-trimester pregnancies at a cost of $50 per patient - just a third of the average $150 then being charged by private Sydney abortion doctors at the time.

Six months later, Preterm was performing 80-90 abortions per week at a cost of $70, up to 75 percent of which could be covered through a combination of federal government benefits and health funds.

Preterm services included a mandatory consultation with one of 16 women counselors before a decision to terminate a pregnancy could be taken. Counselors were trained to view an abortion request as indicative of a "life crisis", with the goal being to find the best solution to the problem. Not all women would choose to terminate a pregnancy and those who did not would be referred to other agencies for help in carrying their pregnancy to full-term. Counselors would also advise women who chose abortions on the use of contraception to avoid further unwanted pregnancies.

Preterm dealt exclusively in first-trimester terminations via vacuum aspiration. Medical staff included eight doctors - five women and three men -- assisted by three registered nurses and two nursing assistants. Procedures lasted 3-5 minutes, with thorough inspection of the removed contents of the uterus to ensure that evacuation had been complete and no complications would arise. The woman was made to rest for an hour to evaluate blood pressure and assess for abdominal pain, before being released with a prescription for antibiotics and being given contraceptives or an intrauterine device.

== Opposition and 1975 fire ==
Within two weeks of opening, the Preterm clinic was the object of a demonstration by the Right to Life association, with an estimated 500 protesters gathering on the street outside the premises.

In the early morning of April 7, 1975, a fire broke out on the ground floor of the three-story building housing the clinic and burned for 4-5 hours, gutting the entire building, destroying the clinic and all its equipment. A Preterm spokesperson said it would cost $20,000-$30,000 to replace destroyed equipment and prepare new premises.

Local news media said the police "arson squad" investigated, focusing on "a group opposing the right of women to have abortions" that had previously picketed the clinic. Various possible causes were cited in the months following the fire, including accidental or spontaneous combustion of refuse in the warehouse on the ground floor of the building.

Preterm director Dorothy Nolan later indicated "darker suspicions", telling the Sydney Morning Herald newspaper that "One of the doctors who had run a lucrative abortion business in Arncliffe until Preterm came on the scene had been making threatening calls to her home at all hours of the night and day." Nolan said she believed this doctor paid his gardener, who lived nearby, to set fire to the clinic because it had been undercutting his business. "There was a strong suspicion but we never had proof," Nolan said.

Other than teaching hospitals, the only other abortion clinics at the time were opereated by Population Services International (Australasia) Ltd. Under the direction of Sydney physician Geoffrey Davis, PSI operated two clinics, one on Foster Road in Arncliffe and the other on Challis Avenue in Potts Point.

Some time later, feminists working at the PSI clinics resigned and later said that the "burning down and destruction of Preterm's premises and equipment on April 7, 1975, enabled Davis’ newly formed PSI to capture a large portion of the market." The PSI workers, now working with Control Abortion Referral Service singled out Davis, producing a copy of a letter he wrote on 6th March 1975 to superiors at PSI headquarters in North Carolina, referencing "warming ourselves round the burning Reichstag" and proclaiming: "This week we crushed St. Annes [sic]; next week - Preterm." They also noted Davis was said to have been “one of the first on the scene” on the morning of the Preterm fire.

Police never established a definitive cause of the fire.

After the fire, Preterm was unable to resume abortion services at its Camperdown premises and it took 18 months for the clinic to become operational again, first at St Ann's private hospital in Killara and later at a location in Surry Hills.

== Clash with feminists ==
In September 1977, Preterm sacked three workers and closed down its research and education department, including research team leader Emily Snyder, the clinic's founding counsellor co-ordinator. The sacking earned the ire of the Australian Social Welfare Union, which threatened to contact its member agencies and advise them not to refer women to Preterm unless the workers were reinstated.

The research and education work carried out at Preterm had been seen previously as "critically important" in building arguments in favor of a woman's right to choose and as a buttress against attacks by Right to Life and other anti-abortion forces. But Preterm rationalized the sackings saying abortion was "no longer seen as a rallying point for women's rights movements."

The sackings led Sydney's feminist movement to abandon its previous support of Preterm, with an article in the feminist paper Mabel calling for a boycott of the clinic and throwing support to the recently established Bessie Smyth Clinic in Homebush, the only remaining feminist-endorsed abortion clinic then operating in Sydney.

A year after the sackings, Bettina Arndt, Preterm Board member and editor of Australian sex-education magazine Forum, further angered feminists with an article in the magazine endorsing Preterm, PSI and private practitioners as "probably the best places to go for an abortion" and criticizing the feminist abortion referral service Control for no longer referring women to either PSI or Preterm.

== 1980s-90s ==
In the 1980s, when religious faith groups turned their activism to anti-abortion protests, Preterm was seen as the arch-nemesis of the Sydney right-to-life movement and became the object of multiple demonstrations. Prayer vigils and sit-ins were organized to block access to the Preterm clinic, which in 1981 was vandalized with red paint and bricks thrown through its windows.

Despite the opposition, Preterm persevered in its mission to provide safe reproductive healthcare and non-judgmental pregnancy terminations. By the 1990s it was estimated that the clinic carried out more than a quarter of all abortions in New South Wales and for many years it was the only clinic to offer termination services exclusively licensed by the New South Wales Department of Health and accredited under Australian federal safety standards.

== Closure ==
In August 2015, Preterm closed down operations after 40 years, apparently the victim of high costs associated with maintaining its licensing and accreditation. Finding it difficult to compete against new players in the market, the board reportedly "opted to close rather than lower standards." A highly visible public campaign to save the clinic was unsuccessful. In September 2015, Preterm was sold to a private investor for an unknown sum.
