= Marrickville Women's Refuge =

Former Australian women's refuge

Marrickville Women's Refuge, also known as Jean's Place, was a women's support facility formally opened in April 1976. It was one of the earliest refuges to open in New South Wales as part of the original NSW Women's Refuge Movement in response to the need for specialised feminist housing and support services for women and children fleeing domestic violence, following that of Elsie Refuge and Bonnie Women's Refuge. Today, the refuge operates as a company limited by guarantee with the name Marrickville Women's Refuge Ltd, and is registered as a public benevolent institution. The refuge, whilst still known as Marrickville Women's Refuge, has been trading as the Aboriginal Women and Children's Crisis Service since 1 November 2014, after the implementation of the 'Going Home Staying Home' tendering program in New South Wales.

== History ==
In January 1974, Vivien Johnson and Kate Jennings, on behalf of a small group of women from the Marrickville area part of the Marrickville Women's Refuge Collective, submitted a letter to the Minister for Security at the time, Bill Hayden, expressing their desire to establish a refuge in the Marrickville municipality. The letter detailed the establishment of the refuge and made a request for government assistance:

We would like the government to assist us in the following ways:

1. Rental of premises
2. Salaries for the above mentioned staff
3. Running costs
4. Initial expenses such as furniture, bedding etc.

This approach to government was initially rejected, and the women were referred to the South-West Sydney Regional Social Development Council to be established under The Australian Assistance Plan for support. At the time, the council did not formally exist. In March 1974, the women submitted a proposal to the council emphasising the need for a women's refuge in the Marrickville area and requested support and financial aid for the establishment and maintenance of the proposed refuge.

"A need exists for temporary accommodation for women and their children to help them through particular crisis situations. The existing facilities provided by both government and private agencies, while they alleviate the situation to some extent, are insufficient to cater adequately for this need."

The council did not become fully operational until early 1975, and it was not until this time that the proposal for the refuge was formally addressed and the request for funds to purchase property and operate the refuge was approved. In June 1975, the Marrickville Women's Refuge Collective received approval for grants totalling more than $100,000 from the council and the Hospitals and Health Services Commission to cover the costs of furniture, equipment, a vehicle, and its first year of operating and salaries. In July, they received a once-off capital grant of $80,000 from the federal government. The grant was recommended by the South-West Sydney Regional Development Council and was to be used for the purchase of a suitable building to establish a refuge for women. Premises was purchased using $64,500 of the allocated grant and in December 1975 the women took possession of the purchased property.

The opening of the refuge was delayed for a further number of months due to a battle with the local council regarding the premises and funding. The local council classified the new refuge as a 'boarding house' and determined that the work of the previous owner of the building would need to be entirely re-done, and the facilities to meet the standards of the new classification. The women struggled with reduced funding for these restoration works and appealed to The Australian Assistance Plan to release the remainder of the $80,000 grant to use for the restorations. However, the refuge officially opened its doors in April 1976, despite the prohibitions imposed by the local and state authorities and the incomplete facilities.

In the following years, the refuge was allocated block funding from the Commonwealth government under the Community Health Program. In 1985, the refuge received a community grant to purchase a utility vehicle to assist with its services. In November 1986, the federal government announced that the refuge would receive $60,000 to renovate and upgrade the existing facilities.

The status of the refuge faced significant uncertainty after the Going Home Staying Home Reforms in 2014, and the failure to secure a tender in the process. In 2014, the original refuge ceased operating and officially closed its doors. At this time, the refuge was then initially granted 15 months funding from the Service Support Fund to begin operating as a specialist Aboriginal service for women and children, and since 2014 the refuge has been trading as the Aboriginal Women and Children's Crisis Service (AWCCS).

Today, the shelter specialises in providing support to Aboriginal women and children who are escaping domestic or family violence. The service also provides support to Aboriginal women and children in the community through various Aboriginal Women's Outreach Services.
