= Geoffrey Davis (doctor) =

Australian medical doctor (1933–2008)

Geoffrey Lancelot Rutter Davis
- Born: 11 October 1933; Sydney, Australia
- Died: 3 October 2008 (aged 74); Sydney, Australia
- Education: Faculty of Medicine, University of Sydney, 1951-1957
- Occupation: Physician
- Years active: 1958-1988
- Employer: Population Services International
- Known for: medicine, reproductive health, abortion
- Spouse(s): Daune Clark De Lano (1959-1968) • Jelena Jovanovic (1969-1981); Helena Berenson (1984-2007)
- Parents: Lancelot Ernest Davis (father); Mavis Doreen Rutter (mother)

Geoffrey Lancelot Rutter Davis (1933–2008) was an Australian medical doctor, who rose to prominence in Sydney in the 1970s as a leading provider of contraception and abortion services. He was also the owner for nearly 50 years of The Abbey, a 50-room mansion in the Sydney inner suburb of Annandale.

== Early life and education ==
Davis was the only son of Lancelot E. Davis, a radio engineer, and Mavis D. Rutter. He was raised in the Sydney suburb of Strathfield and attended the private Anglican-run Trinity Grammar School for boys, graduating in 1950.

From 1951 to 1957, Davis was a student in the Faculty of Medicine at the University of Sydney. In 1958, he received his Bachelor of Medicine and Bachelor of Surgery degrees from Sydney University, serving that year as a Junior Resident Medical Officer at Sydney Hospital and the following year as a Senior Resident Medical Officer at the same hospital.

== Early career ==
After working as a research fellow from 1960 to 1962 in the Kanematsu Institute at Sydney Hospital, Davis moved into general practice from 1962 to 1968 at local Sydney surgeries. During those years, he ran two clinics in the Sydney suburbs of Potts Point and Arncliffe, where he carried out pregnancy terminations prior to the 1971 legalization in New South Wales of abortion in cases where a physician believes a pregnancy has put a woman's life or physical or mental health at risk.

In 1969, he moved to London, where biographical notes prepared by his son, William, say he first "Assisted in Practice" and then from 1971 worked in medical "Practice in Harley Street", which was then a street teeming with medical surgeries, many of which offered abortion services. Though Davis was originally an anesthetist, in London he was becoming increasingly known for his work with late-term abortions and became a director of the International Abortion Research and Training Centre.

It was during this period that he developed what he would later term "a technique for terminating advanced pregnancy". In 1971, he was hired as director of North Carolina–based Population Services International, an international not-for-profit provider of contraception and abortion services, with a focus on the developing world.

== Bangladesh ==
Davis is known for his work in performing late-term abortions in Bangladesh, during the nationwide emergency following Bangladesh's war for national liberation in 1971, in the course of which the Pakistani military and local collaborator militia groups captured, then brutally raped and impregnated as many as 400,000 Bangladeshi women and girls. More conservative estimates placed the total number of rapes at 200,000.

Due to cultural and religious beliefs, the girls and women were considered defiled, most were unable to return home to their villages, where they were shunned at best; or worse, killed by their husbands or families. As many as 200,000 victims were estimated, and widespread venereal infection hampered adoption efforts. With disease and malnutrition rampant in the wake of the war, abortion was seen as the least worst solution to the problem by the Bangladeshi government.

Having had years of prior experience in Sydney terminating first-trimester pregnancies through vacuum aspiration, and having also developed while in London an expeditious technique for terminating second-trimester pregnancies, Davis was recruited while still serving as a PSI director by a consortium of international agencies to work alongside pioneering U.S. obstetrician Leonard Laufe with the government-run Bangladesh Women's Rehabilitation Program, performing abortions at a staggering rate over a six-month period. The Bangladeshi government program was sponsored by the International Planned Parenthood Federation (IPPF), US Agency for International Development (USAID), the United Nations Population Fund (UNFPA) and the World Health Organization (WHO).

In conjunction with Laufe, Davis set up "industrial scale" procedures of abortion beginning in March 1972. First-trimester abortions were carried out using a "device" that performed "the evacuation of uterine contents" (menstrual extraction, aka vacuum aspiration), and advanced pregnancies were terminated using a technique to sever the umbilical cord to speed up fetal extraction, which Davis had developed in London. Davis told an interviewer later that they performed on average 100 abortions per day during the six months he was in Bangladesh. Between them, he said they carried out 95 percent of terminations that had resulted from the mass rapes. He also traveled for months in remote areas to carry out terminations.

Davis later noted that because of the controversial nature of his task, none of the NGOs that recruited him wanted to be publicly identified as behind the program. In virtually all press dispatches in which he was cited at the time and thereafter, he was identified as a director of the London-based International Abortion Research and Training Centre.

== Population Services International (Australasia) Ltd. ==
Following subsequent stints with PSI in Tunisia and India, in 1974 Davis was named PSI's Project Director for Southeast Asia and Oceania, and assumed the direction of Population Services International (Australasia) Ltd. Davis held that position for a decade, when he became director of PSI Australia, from 1984 until his retirement in 1988. The organization initially opened two clinics in the inner Sydney suburbs of Potts Point and Arncliffe, where Davis previously had operated clinics providing abortion services during the 1960s, prior to partial legalization of abortion in New South Wales in 1971. The Potts Point clinic became headquarters of PSI Australasia Ltd.

The services offered by the new PSI clinics differed in two substantial ways from services being delivered by existing abortion clinics, including its main competitor, Preterm Foundation. PSI offered much later-stage abortions, beyond the Preterm limitation of nine weeks' gestation, and PSI abortions were performed under general anesthetic, rather than the then-customary local anesthetic.

In the early morning of 7 April 1975, a fire broke out on the ground floor of the premises housing Preterm Foundation, gutting the entire building, destroying the clinic and all its equipment The police arson squad investigated but never established a definitive cause of the fire.

Feminist healthworkers at Control, Preterm and the PSI clinics implicated Davis in the fire. Preterm director Dorothy Nolan indicated "darker suspicions", later telling the Sydney Morning Herald newspaper that a doctor "who had run a lucrative abortion business in Arncliffe" had been making repeated threatening phone calls to her home. The only abortion clinic legally operating in Arncliffe at the time was run by PSI. Nolan said she always believed the unnamed doctor paid to have the fire set at Preterm because it had been undercutting his business. "There was a strong suspicion but we never had proof," Nolan said.

Feminists working at the time for PSI later said that the "burning down and destruction of Preterm’s premises and equipment on 7 April 1975, enabled Davis' newly formed PSI to capture a large portion of the market." The PSI workers singled out Davis, producing a copy of a letter he wrote on 6 March 1975 to superiors at PSI headquarters in North Carolina, referencing "warming ourselves round the burning Reichstag" and proclaiming: "This week we crushed St. Annes [sic]; next week – Preterm." They also noted Davis was said to have been "one of the first on the scene" on the morning of the Preterm fire.

In December 1976, after more than a year of staff confrontations with Davis and PSI management over questionable medical and counseling practices, PSI's profit-oriented "assembly line" treatment of patients, poor working conditions and arbitrary sackings of staff members, six feminist staffers from the Arncliffe and Potts Point clinics resigned from PSI in protest.

Vowing to expose the conditions at PSI and to work toward creating a feminist-controlled alternative, the staffers proceeded to lobby members of the Australian Parliament, gave media interviews and produced, published and distributed a pamphlet that was highly critical of Davis and PSI, titled ABORTION: OUR BODIES, THEIR POWER. In a June 1977 during a closed-door meeting in Canberra of the Royal Commission on Human Relationships, the women submitted confidential testimony outlining conditions and practices at PSI clinics.

During 1977 Parliamentary debate sparked by PSI's intention to open an abortion clinic in the Australian Capital Territory, Davis and other PSI board members were accused of "profiteering" from PSI's abortion business in Australia and a web of interconnected medical business and property holdings were denounced by hostile members of Parliament. The details of those business and property holdings were also in the possession of the six PSI staff who resigned in protest in December 1976 and were subsequently published in the pamphlet ABORTION: OUR BODIES, THEIR POWER.

== Medical malpractice allegations ==
In 1982, charges were filed against Davis and PSI with the NSW Health Commission, claiming that Davis was guilty of professional misconduct in the cases of two women on whom he practiced two-stage, second-trimester abortions at the PSI Potts Point clinic over two separate days in mid-February 1982.

Both women alleged they had received inadequate prior counseling as to the potential risks involved in second-semester abortions and both complained that they had been given inadequate post-operative care – specifically, that Davis had abandoned the clinic premises shortly after the procedure and was unavailable for consultation when each of their situations worsened.

Both women suffered ruptured uteruses in the course of their procedures and both had to be rushed to the Royal Hospital for Women for further treatment. In the more severe of the two cases, the woman had suffered a ruptured uterus and was nevertheless fitted with an IUD advice at the clinic. Complaining of severe abdominal pains, she into shock and was given a blood transfusion, before being rushed to the Royal Hospital, where a partial hysterectomy was performed and remnants of a 4.3 cm foetal head left by Davis in her cervix had to be removed.

Misconduct charges were filed under the Medical Practitioners Act 1938 and hearings by a Medical Disciplinary Tribunal began in 1983. The Tribunal ultimately found irregularities in the record keeping by PSI staff and "disturbing inconsistencies and conflicts with regard to Davis' activities", but ruled on Christmas eve, 24 December 1986, that Davis was not guilty of professional misconduct and dismissed the charges. In their final report, the Tribunal members appear to have gone out of their way to issue a caveat on their judgement, stating that they had "an uncomfortable feeling that Dr Davis was at too great pains from time to time to justify and explain his conduct to a state of near perfection."

Little more than a year after the end of the disciplinary tribunal, in 1988 Davis retired from practice at the age of 55 and resigned as Director of PSI Australia. During the 1990s, he continued to consult to private medical practices in Sydney.

== Personal ==
In 1959, Lancelot Davis reportedly paid £4,500 for a sprawling 50-room, 13,000-square-meter Victorian-era mansion in Sydney's Annandale district known as The Abbey, and gave it to Geoffrey Davis, then age 26, as a gift for the son's having graduated from medical school.

That same year, Davis married his first of three wives, Daune Mary Clark Delano and moved into one of 12 flats in the subdivided compound with his new wife and her two children. Over the years, the Abbey was claimed by various members of the Davis family and others to be haunted.

A participant in the bohemian-libertarian Sydney Push movement, Davis enjoyed a lavish lifestyle at The Abbey. He "frequently hosted wild parties in the 1960s and 1970s" and it was said that "during the acid-dropping, folk singing 1970s, ghost hunters would brave the night with ectoplasmic machines."

A testament to Davis's expensive tastes was his collection of vintage luxury automobiles, which included a 1929 Mercedes-Benz 38/250SS, worth $100,000 when he purchased it from a maharaja's collection in 1977, as well as "a 1938 Hispano-Suiza, a 1933 Delage 28S, a 1954 Ferrari Monza and a couple of modern Maseratis."

After retirement, Davis continued to live at The Abbey, accompanied by several of his children, stepchildren and grandchildren occupying various wings of the property. Following Davis's death, The Abbey was sold by the family at auction for $4.9 million Australian dollars.

== Death ==
Davis died on 3 October 2008 in Australia.
