= Arnold Zable =

Australian writer

Arnold Zable AO
- Born: 1947 (age 78–79); Wellington, New Zealand
- Occupation: Novelist
- Writing career
- Notable awards: New South Wales Premier's Literary Awards — Multicultural NSW Award, winner 1991

Arnold Zable (born 1947) is an Australian writer, novelist, storyteller and human rights advocate. His books include the memoir Jewels and Ashes, three novels: Café Scheherazade, Scraps of Heaven, and Sea of Many Returns, two collections of stories: The Fig Tree and Violin Lessons, and The Fighter. His most recent book, The Watermill, was published in March 2020.

== Life ==
Zable was born on 10 January 1947 in Wellington, New Zealand to Polish-Jewish refugee parents. They moved early in his life to Australia and he grew up in Carlton, Victoria. Arnold has been active member of the Melbourne Jewish Labour Bund.

== Themes and style ==
Zable is known as a storyteller — through his memoirs, short stories and novels. Australian critic Susan Varga says that Zable's award-winning memoir, Jewels and Ashes, "was a ground-breaking book in Australia, one of the first of what has since become a distinct auto/biographical genre: a second-generation writer returns to the scene of unspeakable crimes to try to understand a fraught and complex legacy, and, in so doing, embarks on a journey into the self."

In an interview Zable explained that the rights and experiences of refugees and asylum seekers underpin his work:

The current generation of refugees are experiencing the intense challenges faced by previous generations. We tend to forget, or fail to imagine, how difficult it is to start life anew far from the homeland. We forget also that nostalgia, the longing for the return to homeland, is a deep and enduring aspect of the refugee experience.

In the same interview he said about his language that "I am drawn to the quirky sayings and observations that define a person or a culture".

== Awards and nominations ==
- 1991: National Book Council Lysbeth Cohen Award for Jewels and Ashes
- 1991: Ethnic Affairs Commission Award for Jewels and Ashes
- 1992: FAW ANA Literature Award for Jewels and Ashes
- 1992: Braille Book of the Year Award for Jewels and Ashes
- 1992: Talking Book of the Year award for Jewels and Ashes
- 2001: Shortlisted New South Wales Premier's Literary Awards for fiction for Cafe Scheherazade
- 2003: People's Choice Award, Tasmanian Pacific Fiction Prize for Cafe Scheherazade
- 2004: National Folk Recording Award for The Fig Tree
- 2010: Nominated for The International IMPAC Dublin Literary Award for Sea of Many Returns
- 2013: The Victorian Council for Civil Liberties Voltaire Award
- 2015: Life membership, Writers Victoria
- 2016: Shortlisted, The Victorian Premier's Literary Awards for 'The Fighter'
- 2016: Shortlisted, The New South Wales Literary awards for 'The Fighter'
- 2017: The Australia Council Fellowship for Literature
- 2020: Shortlisted, Queensland Literary Awards, Nonfiction Book Award, for The Watermill
- 2021: Australia Council Award for Lifetime Achievement in Literature

== Bibliography ==
=== Books ===
Year	Title	Imprint	ISBN
1982	Clown Boy	Oxford University Press	ISBN 0195543777
1982	The River Man	Oxford University Press	ISBN 0195543831
1991	Jewels and Ashes	Scribe	ISBN 0908011202
1998	Wanderers and Dreamers: Tales of the David Herman Theatre	Hyland House	ISBN 1864470615
2001	Cafe Scheherazade	Text Publishing	ISBN 187648571X
2002	The Fig Tree	Text Publishing	ISBN 1877008230
2004	Scraps of Heaven	Text Publishing	ISBN 1877008869
2008	Sea of Many Returns	Text Publishing	ISBN 9781921351532
2011	Violin Lessons	Text Publishing	ISBN 9781921758478
2012	Lygon St, Little Bourke St, Lonsdale St.: The Vibrant History of Melbourne's Italian, Chinese and Greek Cultural Precincts: Stories From the Heart of Melbourne	City of Melbourne	OCLC 828643946
2016	The Fighter	Text Publishing	ISBN 9781925355062
2020	The Watermill	Text Publishing	ISBN 9781922268556

=== Selected critical studies and reviews of Zable's work ===
Violin lessons

- Borghino, José (September 2011). "What crime?". Australian Book Review (334): 30.
