= Lynette Syme =

Australian activist

Lynette "Lyn" Syme (1948-2019) was an Australian political and labor activist, feminist and aboriginal land-rights advocate, recognized in her later years as a Wiradjuri elder of the Dabee people (North-East Wiradjuri) in what is current-day New South Wales.

== Early life ==
Born 25 April 1948, Lyn was the third and youngest daughter born to Kathleen Elsie Stringer and Walter William Stephen Booth, whose great grandmother, Rose Lambert, had been a full-blooded Wiradjuri woman of the Dabee people. The couple divorced in 1950, with Lyn's mother retaining custody of the children.

Following her divorce, in 1952 Lyn's mother married Dominic (Don) Syme, a fellow member of the Communist Party of Australia (CPA) and the owner of a poultry farm in Moorebank, southwest of Sydney. Dominic adopted Lyn and her older twin sisters, Robyn and Wendy; Lyn would also have two half-sisters, Nell and Nolene, born to Dominic and Kathleen. Lyn and her sisters grew up on the Syme family farm in Moorebank and in nearby Liverpool.

== Political activism ==
Lyn's parents were both prominent CPA members in New South Wales in the 1950s. In the 1960s and 1970s, they opposed the Vietnam war, with her father regularly making anti-war speeches at "Speakers Corner" in Liverpool. Both parents were also committed feminists, conservationists and supporters of Aboriginal land rights.

Lyn became a member of the Communist Youth Movement and would represent the organization in broad-front activities, including rallies against Australian involvement in the Vietnam War and in support of the Democratic Republic of Vietnam (DRV) and the Provisional Revolutionary Government of the Republic of South Vietnam (PRG).

== Builder Labourers Federation (NSWBLF) ==
After the CPA adopted a policy of support for Women’s Liberation and for other protest groups in 1972, Lyn and her sister Wendy were among a group of young left-wing feminist activists who joined the NSW chapter of the Builders Labourers Federation (NSWBLF), becoming trailblazers in the fight to gain acceptance for women working on construction sites in Australia.

In 1974, she became an organizer for the union. Active in NSWBLF's "Green Bans" campaigns against development projects seen as harmful to neighborhoods and natural environment, Lyn was arrested with another NSWBLF woman and four others in a protest on 5 April 1974 at the home of property developer F.W. Theeman, whose project at Victoria Street, Potts Point, was on the union's green ban list at the time.

== Women's movement ==
Also active in Sydney's Women's Liberation Movement, Lyn was in the front line of a contingent of NSWBLF women who on 8 March 1974 conspicuously participated in the 1974 International Women's Day celebration in Sydney, marching behind a hand-made banner proclaiming their presence and showing support for women's rights.

She also was one of six women staffers who resigned from leading abortion services provider Population Services International (Australasia) Ltd in December 1976 to protest substandard conditions for patients and poor working conditions for staff at PSI's Potts Point and Arncliffe clinics. She and six other feminists subsequently submitted confidential "whistleblower" testimony to the Royal Commission on Human Relationships meeting in Canberra and published and distributed a pamphlet detailing the adverse conditions for women seeking pregnancy terminations at the PSI clinics.

== Aboriginal culture and land rights ==
As a result of her Wiradjuri ancestry, Lynn was accepted as a member of the Dabee people inhabiting the area centered on the small town of Kandos, formerly a company town built in the early 20th century around the now-defunct NSW Cement Lime and Coal Company, about 230 km northwest of Sydney.

Her involvement with Aboriginal culture projects dates to July 1974, when the leadership and members of the NSWBLF builders' union collaborated in the opening in the Sydney suburb of Redfern of the Black Theatre Aboriginal Arts and Culture Centre. She later became associated with the Boomalli Aboriginal Artists Co-operative, founded in 1984 by 10 urban aboriginal artists in Redfern, and contributed an essay on the Boomali co-operative to The Oxford Companion to Aboriginal Art and Culture.

In 2015, Syme co-organised the Dabee Aboriginal Travelling Exhibition, inaugurated in Kandos with support from the North East Wiradjuri Company and Kandos Historical Society, with additional exhibition openings at locations across NSW. Initially funded by initially by a native title agreement with Moolarben Coal's cultural activities fund, the Dabee exhibition was subsequently financed with matching funds from the NSW Office of Environment and Heritage.

Much of Syme's work in the Kandos area centered on Aboriginal land rights and assessments of the impact of mining operations on the local environment and aboriginal lands and associated cultural patrimony.

Lyn and her life partner, Wiradjuri elder Kevin Williams, have been cited in innumerable reports on the impact of Australian and multinational mining operations in the area corresponding to historical Dabee and Wiradjuri ancestral lands, as well as issues centered on native title and land rights in relation to traveling stock routes through the Central Tablelands of NSW.

The pair were also driving forces behind the Futurelands initiative, to foment innovative conversations about human relationships to the land among NSW farmers, indigenous historians and land custodians, agronomists, economists, writers and artists.

Lyn was also involved in negotiating one of the first-ever agreements by a non-native owner of lands in New South Wales to voluntarily sign over land title to the traditional owners, in a unique treaty that was hoped to serve as a template for future accords with original First Nation communities in Australia.

== Death ==
Lyn Syme died in Kandos, NSW, in October 2019. The Aunty Lyn Syme Memorial and Dabee Art Exhibition opened the Aboriginal Cultural Centre in Kandos on Thursday 21 November 2019.
