= Bonnie Women's Refuge =

Australian women's refuge

Bonnie Women's Refuge (originally Bonny Women's Refuge) is a women's refuge located in south-west Sydney, established in 1974. It was the second refuge to open in Australia, following Elsie Refuge, and formed part of the original NSW Women's Refuge Movement which was established to meet the need for specialised housing and support services for women and children escaping domestic violence. The refuge, now operated as a company limited by guarantee with the name Bonnie Support Services Ltd, is registered as a public benevolent institution. It continues to provide vital support and crisis accommodation for women and children experiencing and escaping domestic violence.

== History ==
Bonnie's was established by a group of female volunteers including Susan Varga, Kay Ferrington, Joan Killorn, Betty Pybus and Edith Warburton. Other women who were crucially involved included Nola Cooper, Christine Sykes and Diane Powell. The Sydney Women's Liberation Newsletter (February, 1975) provided the following description of the women:

The group became a very vehement and enthusiastic one....it seems because the women involved had very strong and definite ideas of what they wanted.

The first cottage was located at 260 Burns Road, Bonnyrigg. The refuge was named after the suburb, but also in line with the new tradition of calling refuges by a woman's name. The Sydney Woman's Liberation Newsletter of the time provided the following description of the refuge:

Bonny is small – 3 bedrooms, 1 small room to be converted into a bedroom, a small kitchen, reasonable lounge/dining room, sheds at the back that can be cleaned and fixed up to become a play and sleeping area for the kids, a chicken coop, enough room for a vegetable garden, a pan toilet. We have fourteen beds and could build a sleep-out on the back. We have basic furniture but we need a washing machine and an extra refrigerator.

Are there any students/interested women who could help us out for a month or two by being a live-in, part-time administrator? This would bridge the gap until we get a roster better organized and/or get some money.

We’ve got a real chance of getting a Women’s Shelter going in an area where it is desperately needed. We need the help and skills of lots of women.

In 1975 the Whitlam government began funding health and welfare services for women. Funding was given to the refuge through the Health Commission from an Australian government grant. At the time, women living at Bonnie contributed to their food and the grant covered all other operating costs, which amounted to around $30,000 per year. In 1978, Fairfield Council donated land, where a new refuge was built with funding from both Federal and New South Wales governments. The mayor of Fairfield at the time, Janice Crosio, was a key supporter of the project. However, securing funding continued to be an ongoing struggle for the Women's Refuge Movement between 1976 and 1983, until federal funding was restored under the Women's Emergency Services Program. From 1985, women's refuges were granted funding under the joint Commonwealth and State Support Accommodation Assistance Program (SAAP).

In 1992 due to the high demand for services, a second house was built alongside the first. Today, the refuge continues to operate from both houses. The service now also provides access to transitional properties and a wide range of other support and outreach services. The service has also produced books and guides specifically for children staying in a women's refuge. For Bonnie's 40th anniversary celebration, one of the early founders, Susan Varga, wrote two poems about the early experiences and the establishment of the refuge.

Today, Bonnie Women's Refuge is one of the few specialist women's providers of refuge accommodation surviving following the New South Wales government's 2014 "Going Home, Staying Home" tendering process.
