= Margaret Hooks =

Irish-born author and journalist (1945–2021)

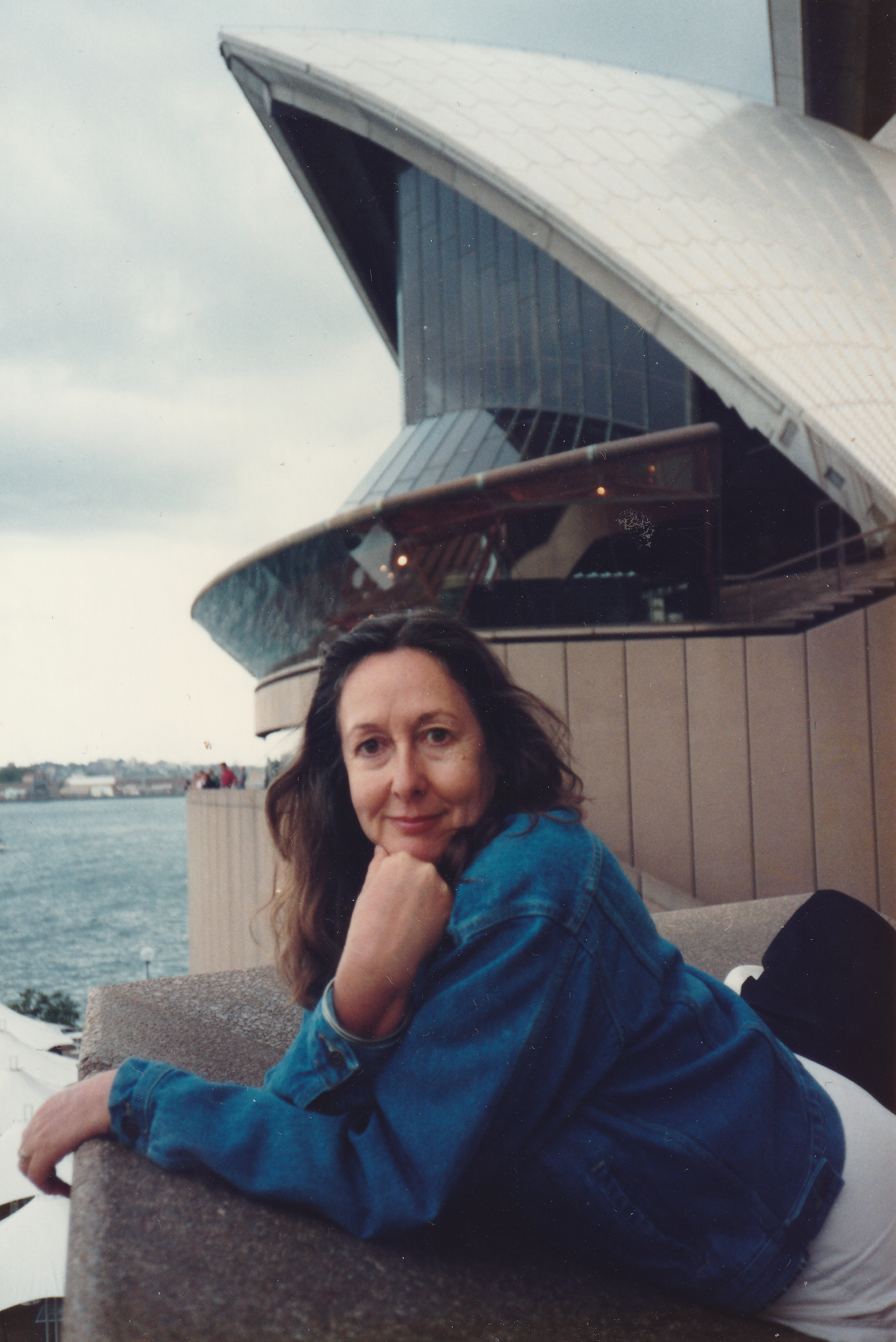
- Born: June 7, 1945; Belfast, N. Ireland
- Died: July 19, 2021 (aged 76); Xàbia (Jávea), Spain
- Citizenship: Ireland, United Kingdom
- Occupations: Author and journalist
- Years active: 1979–2021
- Spouse: David Gibb (m. 1966–1967) Ron Robinson (1968–1974) Michael Tangeman (m. 1985–2021)

Margaret Hooks (1945–2021) was an Irish-born author and journalist, best known for her books and writing about women, art and photography, including a celebrated biography of the Italian-born photographer Tina Modotti, and books and articles about Surrealism and artists related to the Surrealist movement.

== Early life ==
Hooks was born at Belfast's Royal Victoria Hospital, the eldest of six children. Her parents were prominent members of the local Plymouth Brethren congregation. She left Belfast in 1964 for a job in the civil service in London, where she embraced the counterculture of the time. In the 1970s, she twice traveled overland from London to India.

== Activism ==
Settling in Sydney in 1973, Hooks became active in leftwing and feminist circles. She was hired in 1974 by the Sydney-based anti-war campaign organization AICD (the Association for International Cooperation & Disarmament, now known as the People for Nuclear Disarmament NSW) to direct its Latin America section, lobbying Australian Senators and Members of Parliament to enable resettlement of political asylum seekers fleeing repression from military regimes in South American countries, particularly Chile. She also served as Treasurer and Events Coordinator of the Chile Solidarity Committee in Sydney from 1974 to 1977 and on behalf of AICD organized visits to Australia by peace delegations from Latin America and Asia.

As a co-founder of Women In Solidarity for Peace, she also co-organized a month-long tour and participation of a delegation of Vietnamese women peace activists to the demonstration/celebration of International Women's Day in Sydney on March 8, 1975.

Hooks co-authored and published “Abortion: Our Bodies, Their Power”, a booklet critical of doctors and administrators at two Sydney abortion clinics operated by Population Services International (Australasia) Ltd. In June 1977, Hooks and six other former staffers at PSI abortion clinics in Sydney provided confidential "whistleblower" testimony to the Royal Commission on Human Relationships in Canberra regarding poor conditions for patients and staff at the PSI clinics and on the quality of abortion services in Australia, generally.

== Journalism ==
Hooks began a career in journalism upon relocating to Mexico in 1979, writing freelance articles about conditions for women in Mexico and Guatemala for international feminist publications, including the UK's Spare Rib magazine and Off Our Backs in the United States, while also doing volunteer work on human rights in Central America for non-governmental activist organizations based in London and Mexico City.

In 1984, she was given press credentials by British journalist Duncan Campbell, then with the London-based City Limits magazine, to travel to the Guatemalan highlands in order to report on rights violations and atrocities being committed against that country's indigenous population by the Guatemalan military in its counterinsurgency war against leftist guerrillas. Her reporting from that trip was published in The National Times of Australia and specialist journals, including Cultural Survival Quarterly and others, launching Hooks into a full-time journalism career.

By late-1984, she had become Mexico Correspondent for The Sunday Tribune of Dublin, Ireland, while working as Managing Editor of the Encuentro bi-weekly political supplement of Mexico's sole English-language newspaper, The Mexico City News.

In the immediate aftermath of the September 1985 Mexico City earthquake, she was named as Mexico-based correspondent for Ireland's leading newspaper, The Irish Times. Hooks covered breaking news and wrote feature articles for the paper from 1985 to 1991, filing stories from Mexico and Central America, with a focus on the region's armed conflicts and counterinsurgency campaigns and their impact on civilian populations, particularly in Guatemala.

Her by-lined stories from the region also appeared in a number of U.S. and British news publications, including The Guardian and The Observer newspapers in the UK, San Francisco-based Pacific News Service, The San Francisco Examiner, The San Diego Union, The Houston Chronicle, The Miami Herald, and others.

After a break from journalism to focus on book-writing, in 1996 Hooks became Mexico Correspondent for New York-based ARTnews and on relocating to Miami, Florida, in 1998 she was named a Contributing Editor of the magazine. Her writing on the visual arts and culture also appeared in a variety of other publications, including Grand Street Magazine, AfterImage Magazine, Aperture Magazine, Vogue, Elle Magazine, The Observer Magazine, Luna Córnea, The Daily Beast and BOMB magazine.

== Books ==
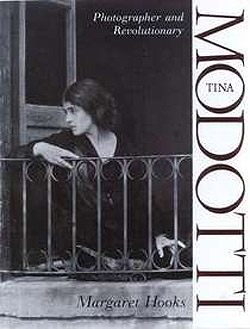
Hooks, Margaret.Tina Modotti: Photographer and Revolutionary (1st Hardcover ed.),1993, HarperCollins, London and San Francisco. ISBN 9780044408796

In her lifetime, Hooks published eight books of non-fiction, mainly focused on topics or subjects involving women, artists and the Surrealist movement. She also translated into English the Spanish-language autobiography of Austrian-born psychoanalyst Marie Langer, From Vienna to Managua: Journey of a Psychoanalyst, published in 1989 by Free Association Books (London).

Guatemalan Women Speak, chronicling women impacted by the military repression and genocide against indigenous peoples in Guatemala during the 1980s, was published in 1991 in London by CIIR. The book was released in a second edition in 1993, published in Washington, D.C. by EPICA.

The acclaimed Tina Modotti: Photographer and Revolutionary, about the Italian-born photographer and left-wing activist Tina Modotti, was published in 1993 by HarperCollins and deemed “a definitive biography" by the New York Times. In the book, Hooks "detailed [Modotti's] life as an artist, activist and woman at the height of Mexican muralism, where Bohemia met political revolution through a whirlwind of artistic expression." British feminist art historian and filmmaker Laura Mulvey lauded the book as a "carefully researched and fascinating biography" that showed "how legend and myth became an inextricable part of Modotti's afterlife and thus unavoidably part of her story."

Shortlisted in 1994 for the Kraszna-Krausz book award for writing on photography and for the annual Infinity award by the International Center for Photography, the book has been published in eight languages. After a first paperback edition by HarperCollins, the book was again reprinted in 2000 by Da Capo Press in a special paperback edition titled Tina Modotti: Radical Photographer. In 2017, the Madrid-based publisher of books on art and photography, La Fábrica, published new reprints of the book in Spanish and English, distributed in the United States by D.A.P./Artbook.

A Hooks authored two additional monographs on Modotti; the first, titled Tina Modotti (Aperture Masters of Photography), published in 1999 by the Aperture Foundation with a tri-lingual co-edition by Könemann Verlags GmbH; and the second, titled Tina Modotti, first published in 2002 as part of the Phaidon 55's series, and reprinted in 2005 under the same title in large format.

Frida Kahlo: Portraits of an Icon was published in a 2002 co-edition by Bloomsbury, London, and Turner Libros, Madrid. The book was published in Spanish that same year by Turner as Frida Kahlo: La Gran Ocultadora.

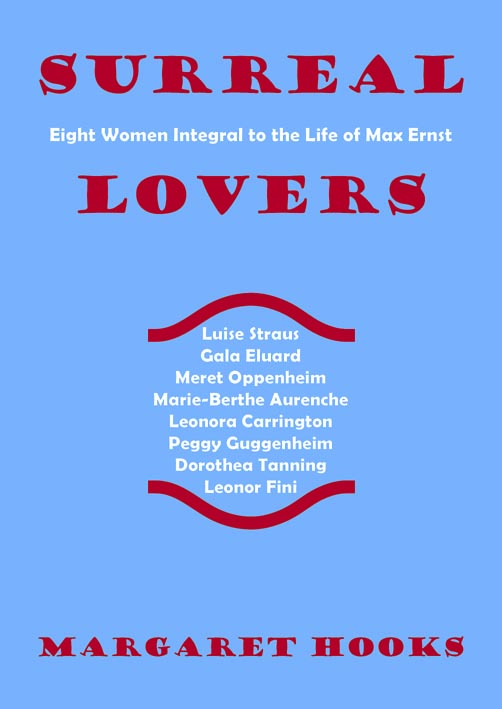
Hooks, Margaret. Surreal Lovers: Eight Women Integral to the Life of Max Ernst, 2018 (2nd ed.), La Fabrica, Madrid. ISBN 978-8417048006

Surreal Eden: Edward James and Las Pozas was published in 2007by Princeton Architectural Press, and tells the story of Edward James, the "wealthy British surrealist-art benefactor turned rural Mexican architect, demi-god and dreamer", patron of Surrealists Salvador Dalí and Rene Magritte and friend of the artist Leonora Carrington, who over a period of 40 years built a surrealist sculpture garden at Las Pozas, high in the Sierra Huasteca mountains of Mexico. The book also published in Spanish by Turner Mexico that same year, under the title Edward James y Las Pozas: Un sueño surrealista en la selva mexicana.

Manel Armengol: Herbarium, a monograph of the work of Catalán photographer Manel Armengol, was also published in 2007 by Turner.

Hooks’ last book, Surreal Lovers: Eight Women Integral to the Life of Max Ernst, published in 2017 by La Fábrica and reprinted in a second edition in 2018, focuses on eight women who influenced the life and work of Surrealist painter Max Ernst. The book chronicles the relationships between Ernst and Leonora Carrington, Peggy Guggenheim, Dorothea Tanning, Luise Straus, Marie-Berthe Aurenche, Leonor Fini, Meret Oppenheim and Gala Dalí.

== Death ==
Hooks died at home in Xàbia (Jávea), Spain, on July 19, 2021, of cancer.
