= Geoffrey Keighley =

Australian barrister, businessman, cricketer, farmer, grazier and legislator

William Geoffrey Keighley OAM (10 January 1925 – 14 June 2005) was an English-Australian barrister, businessman, first-class cricketer, farmer, grazier and legislator.

Keighley was born in Nice, France. His family had business interests in Bradford, West Yorkshire and New South Wales. He was educated at the Tudor House preparatory school in New South Wales, Eton and Trinity College, Oxford.

He received private coaching from the Yorkshire and England cricketer Herbert Sutcliffe (who was a friend of his mother's from Bradford). He captained the Eton XI, before going up to Oxford. After being called up by the Royal Air Force (RAF), he was trained as a navigator, but never flew on operations.

Upon returning to Oxford, he was awarded a blue. As a stylish right-handed batsman, he scored 105 versus South Africa in his second match, and 99 versus Cambridge University in 1947. His highest innings was 110 versus Surrey at Headingley in 1951. He held the second wicket partnership of 226 (with Tony Pawson) for Varsity matches.

In 1947, he became the thirty first non-native cricketer to represent Yorkshire, although at the time the club did not know that he had been born abroad. Keighley declined the captaincy of the Marylebone Cricket Club (MCC), Middlesex and Yorkshire. He played as an amateur in 65 first-class matches, before his retirement in 1951. He scored 2,539 runs, with two centuries, at an average of 27.01. He bowled occasional right-arm medium pace but did not take a wicket.

He was admitted to the Inner Temple as a barrister and he married the Honourable Olivia Lubbock (a sister of the 4th Baron Avebury) at St George's Church, Hanover Square in London on 10 May 1951. They settled in Temora, New South Wales, Australia and had two sons and two daughters. The marriage was dissolved in 1974. He married his second wife Karin Spiegel in 1974.

He became a member of the New South Wales Legislative Council. He pursued a wide range of hobbies and sporting interests. He was awarded the Medal of the Order of Australia (OAM) in 2002, and died in Sutton Forest, New South Wales in June 2005, aged 80.
