= Joyce Stevens =

Australian socialist-feminist activist, communist and historian

- Born: Joyce Barnes; 6 January 1928; Cullen Bullen, New South Wales, Australia
- Died: 2014 (aged 85–86)
- Other name: Barnes
- Occupations: Socialist-feminist activist, Communist, Historian

Joyce Stevens AM (1928–2014) was an Australian socialist-feminist activist, communist, and historian, one of the founders of the women's liberation movement in Sydney, prominent in the wave of feminism that began in the late 1960s in Australia.

A leading member of the Communist Party of Australia (CPA), Stevens reconciled feminism with her experience of class politics.

Stevens was active and at the vanguard of the women's liberation movement in Sydney, "agitating, educating, and organizing, helping set up the services women needed, and then later mentoring other women and chronicling women's history through her written work".

== Early life ==
Stevens was born Joyce Barnes on 6 January 1928 at Cullen Bullen, New South Wales near Lithgow, New South Wales, Australia. Her first home was a tin shed. Her mother had been a nurse, her father was a railway fettler, who moved from job to job. At age six, living near Casino, NSW Stevens recalled that they lived on the rabbits and foxes he trapped. During childhood she developed a strong sense of social justice, influenced by her mother Lucie Barnes.

In 1942 the family moved to Sydney, where Stevens briefly attended North Sydney Girls High School. Her first job was as an articled clerk at a law firm. She was in the Land Army for a year. She later worked at the NSW Teachers Federation where she was influenced by communist women.

Her active participation began when she joined the Eureka Youth League in 1942 and its parent body, the Communist Party of Australia in 1945. She became an organiser with the Eureka Youth League in 1948. Impressed by a 1955 CPA study group to China, Stevens returned home and led the CPA's Inner West activities – social policy, education, health, and especially housing.

== Work and activism ==
From the mid-1960s Stevens worked full-time for the CPA and became the CPA's National Women's Organiser. She worked as a journalist on the CPA newspaper Tribune: The People's Paper. Stevens was also secretary and general office administrator for Current Book Distributors 1963–1972.

Stevens campaigned for improved living standards; supporting industrial activity; the Campaign for Nuclear Disarmament and environmental causes; opposing Nuclear weapons testing in the Pacific, Uranium mining in Australia, and the Vietnam War. After reading Simone de Beauvoir, she added feminism to her causes.

In 1971 Stevens helped produce the first and subsequent issues of Mejane: A Women's Liberation Newspaper, published by the Mejane Collective; and Scarlet Woman, the first socialist-feminist magazine, published by the Sydney Scarlet Woman Collective in 1975. Stevens helped re-establish the annual International Women's Day March and in 1975 wrote Because We're Women for International Women's Year, which has since been translated into many languages. She played a significant role in establishing Women's Liberation House in Alberta Street, Sydney from where a contraception and abortion referral service was run. This led over time to a change in the law.

Stevens helped organize dozens of successful conferences, commissions and seminars. These identified issues including domestic violence and the need for women's refuges.

Elsie, the first women's refuge in Australia, was established by Stevens and a group of women in Glebe, Sydney in 1974. She also played a significant role in establishing Women's Liberation House in Alberta Street, Sydney, established the first two women's health centres in Sydney–Leichhardt Women's Community Health Centre (LWCHC) in 1974 and Liverpool Women's Health Centre in 1975, and was instrumental in setting up the Control Abortion Referral Service.

The Australian Council of Trade Unions adopted an amended version of her Working Women's Charter. Stevens helped found the Women's Employment Action Centre (WEAC) which campaigned for better wages and working conditions for women; especially for underprivileged women, and attempted to establish a comparable worth case between pay rates of traditional female and male occupations. She worked on its register of women in non-traditional jobs.

Stevens became part of the CPA working to reconstruct its "socialist vision" by drawing on feminist, environmental, Aboriginal and multi-cultural inputs and aspirations. She supported the dissolution of the CPA in 1991. believing new forms of organization were required for the renewal of left politics.

== Personal life ==
While working as an organizer with the Eureka Youth League in the late 1940s, she met her future husband, Jim Stevens. They married in 1949. Stevens separated from Jim in 1970, and began a 40-year lesbian relationship with Margo Moore. Stevens died on 6 May 2014.

== Honours ==
In 1996, she was made a Member of the Order of Australia in the Australia Day Honours for her "service to social justice for women as an activist and writer".

In 1988 she was recognised by the Sydney Public Tenants' Council for her commitment to public housing and as advocate for public housing tenants.

In 2002 she was awarded the Women's Electoral Lobby's Edna Ryan Award for Mentoring.

== Publications ==
=== Author ===
- Stevens, J. (c.1970) Tendencies in the women's liberation movement, Australia.
- Stevens, J. (1975) Because We're Women —written for an International Women's Day broadsheet, the words have been republished on Australian and overseas postcards, stickers, posters and T-shirts.
- Stevens, J. (1976) Taking the Revolution Home: Work among Women in the Communist Party of Australia 1920–1945, Sybylla Co-operative Press and Publications, Fitzroy, Victoria.
- Stevens, J. (1985) A History of International Women's Day in Words and Images, IWD Press, Pennington, South Australia.
- Stevens, J. (1991) Lightening the Load: Women and Work: A History of Women's Employment Action Centre (WEAC) 1982–1989, Women's Employment Action Centre, South Sydney, New South Wales.
- Stevens, J. (1995) Healing Women: A History of Leichhardt Women's Community Health Centre, First Ten Years History Project, Leichhardt, New South Wales.

=== Chapters in publications ===
- Stevens, J. (1980) Without Fear or Favour: Lucie Barnes, in Women, Class and History: Feminist Perspectives on Australia, 1788–1978, Windschuttle, Elizabeth (editor) Fontana/Collins, Sydney.
- Stevens, J. (1986) The Politics of Reconstructing Socialism in Moving Left: The Future of Socialism in Australia, McKnight, D. (editor), Pluto Press, Sydney.
- Stevens, J. (1993) A Reasonable Exchange in Glorious Age: Growing Older Gloriously, Scutt, J.A., Artemis, Melbourne.

== Documentary archive ==
- Stevens, J. and Wills, J., archivists, The First Ten Years of Sydney Women's Liberation, ca. 1969-ca. 1980 – a collection of textual records, sound recordings, graphic materials, newspaper and magazine clippings, ephemera, & posters, acquired by the State Library of NSW in 1999.
- Stevens, J. and Barnes, L. Joyce Stevens papers, 1912–2005, including her manuscripts and dozens of recorded interviews with women activists, were presented to the State Library of NSW by Waldran, J, April 2009.
