= Bessie Guthrie =

Australian designer and feminist

- Born: Bessie Jean Thompson Mitchell; 2 July 1905; Camperdown, New South Wales, Australia
- Died: 17 December 1977; Glebe, New South Wales, Australia
- Occupation(s): Designer, publisher, feminist, activist
- Notable work: Founder of the Elsie Women's Refuge Night Shelter
- Spouse(s): Ivor Ralph Michael Russell (m. 1935; div. 1937), Clive Guthrie (m. 1950; d. 1971)

Bessie Guthrie (2 July 1905 – 17 December 1977) was an Australian designer, publisher, feminist and campaigner for women's and children's rights. She was one of the founders of the Elsie Women's Refuge Night Shelter, the first women's refuge in Australia.

== Early life ==
Bessie Jean Thompson Mitchell was born on 2 July 1905 at Rosalie, Church Street, Camperdown, New South Wales. The only child of James Buchanan Mitchell and his wife Jane Elizabeth Coulson. She was raised and educated by her two schoolteacher aunts, Janet Forbes Mackenzie Mitchell and Margaret Crichton Mitchell.

== Education ==
Guthrie attended industrial and modern interior design classes at East Sydney Technical College. She was the first woman to hold an exhibition of design art at the college in 1930.

== Career ==
Guthrie began selling her designs for modular furniture to various companies. She was employed as furniture draughtswoman with Grace Bros Ltd's department stores. Guthrie also developed a private practice in interior design specialising in the modernist style. Her group of friends included Hal Missingham, Kenneth Slessor and Dulcie Deamer who invited her to write for the Australian Woman's Mirror in the late 1930s. She also contributed to the Australian Women's Weekly and Good Fellows magazines.

=== Publisher ===
Guthrie established her own publishing company, Viking Press, in 1939. She concentrated on anti-war tracts and designed and illustrated books of women's poetry including the earliest works of Dorothy Auchterlonie (later Green), Elizabeth Riddell, Elizabeth Lambert, Harley Matthews and Muir Holburn.

=== World War II ===
During World War II Guthrie became head draughtswoman for De Havilland Aircraft Pty Ltd's experimental gliders factory and worked for the Commonwealth as a draughtswoman on aircraft design.

=== Teacher and activist ===
After the war, Guthrie lectured in design at East Sydney Technical College, the Workers' Educational Association and for the university's Department of Tutorial Classes. Guthrie worked as a clerk in the Government Insurance Office of New South Wales from 1952 until her retirement in 1972. In the 1950s Guthrie and her husband opened their home to young girls who were victims of domestic violence, abuse, drunkenness, homelessness and the child welfare system.

Guthrie was one of a small group of women who made a squatter occupation of two empty houses in inner-city Glebe which led to the establishment of 'Elsie' in 1974, the first refuge in Australia for women and children who were the victims of domestic violence.

Bessie Guthrie continued her 20-year involvement with girls and women. She did extensive research of the network of Children's Courts, church and state homes and the child welfare system generally, and led protests and gained publicity that gradually led to change including the closure of both the Parramatta Girls' Training School and Hay children's prison.

== Legacy ==
Guthrie featured on a poster by Toni Robertson for the first Women and Labour Conference in 1978. A copy of the poster is in the collection of the National Gallery of Australia. The Women's Emergency Shelter and Training Scheme, established as a half-way house for women who had become part of the criminal justice system was renamed Guthrie House in 1995.

== Personal life ==
Guthrie was married to Ivor Ralph Michael Russell, a tailor, from 1935 to 1937. She later married Clive Guthrie in 1950, and was widowed when he died in 1971. Guthrie died on 17 December 1977 in Glebe.
