= Royal Commission on Human Relationships =

Royal Commission on Human Relationships 1974

Australia's Royal Commission on Human Relationships was established in August 1974 by Prime Minister Gough Whitlam of the Australian Labor Party (ALP) after the failure in 1973 of the government to pass reforms to the country's abortion legislation. In Australia, a royal commission is typically held on matters of public importance.

The Commission was chaired by the Australian reformist lawyer and jurist Elizabeth Andreas Evatt. Other members included the Rev. Felix Arnott, Anglican Archbishop of Brisbane and Metropolitan of the Province of Queensland and prominent Sydney journalist Anne Deveson.

The terms of reference for the Commission included sex education and family planning, particularly related to medical training and fertility control and abortion services, and the position of women in relation to these subjects. Ultimately, the Commission would report back on a broad range of the family, social, educational, legal and sexual aspects of heterosexual and homosexual male and female relationships, with recommendations on responsible parenthood and family planning.

Public testimony was encouraged, with Commission member Anne Deveson specifically calling on the Australian women's movement to participate in and support the commission's public hearings. A series of nationwide hearings began in Sydney on 6 November 1974 and continued in Melbourne, Canberra, Adelaide, Brisbane, Perth, Bunbury, and Hobart, then closing with a final hearing in Sydney in February 1976.

The commission received more than 1,200 written submissions, with several hundred witnesses giving testimony in formal hearings. Additional confidential testimony was received by the commission in informal, closed-door hearings.

The commission's work spawned several research reports on topics that included medical education, abortion, attitudes toward sexuality, rape, disability, domestic violence, child abuse and the needs and concerns of migrant women.

Ultimately, the commission accepted many of the recommendations put forward by the Australian women's movement. On the issue of abortion that led to its formation, the commission recommended that abortion law remain the jurisdiction of states and territories, but that the practice should be decriminalized when carried out in the first 22 weeks of pregnancy and beyond that date in certain specific circumstances.

Australian Catholic bishops strongly protested the inclusion of testimony on homosexuality in hearings focused on parenthood and families. Religious and right-to-life groups were highly critical of the commission's final recommendations, particularly on the subject of abortion.

After the November 1975 Australian constitutional crisis, in which Governor-General Sir John Kerr dismissed the Whitlam government and appointing Malcolm Fraser, leader of the Liberal Party of Australia, as prime minister, the commission was allowed to continue its work. But commission members complained in a 1976 interim report that the Fraser government was hampering its work by cutting its budgetary funding. Five research reports undertaken by the commission had to be abandoned due to budget cuts and commissioners said the government requirement that it finish its work six months earlier than anticipated would undercut the quality of their final report.

The commission's final report was issued in 12 volumes in November 1977. A version of the commission's final report leaked by the Fraser government to the press prior to its publication was used by both the Liberals and the Labor party to try to sway voters in the run-up to the December 1977 federal elections.
