= Elsie Refuge =

Women's refuge in Glebe

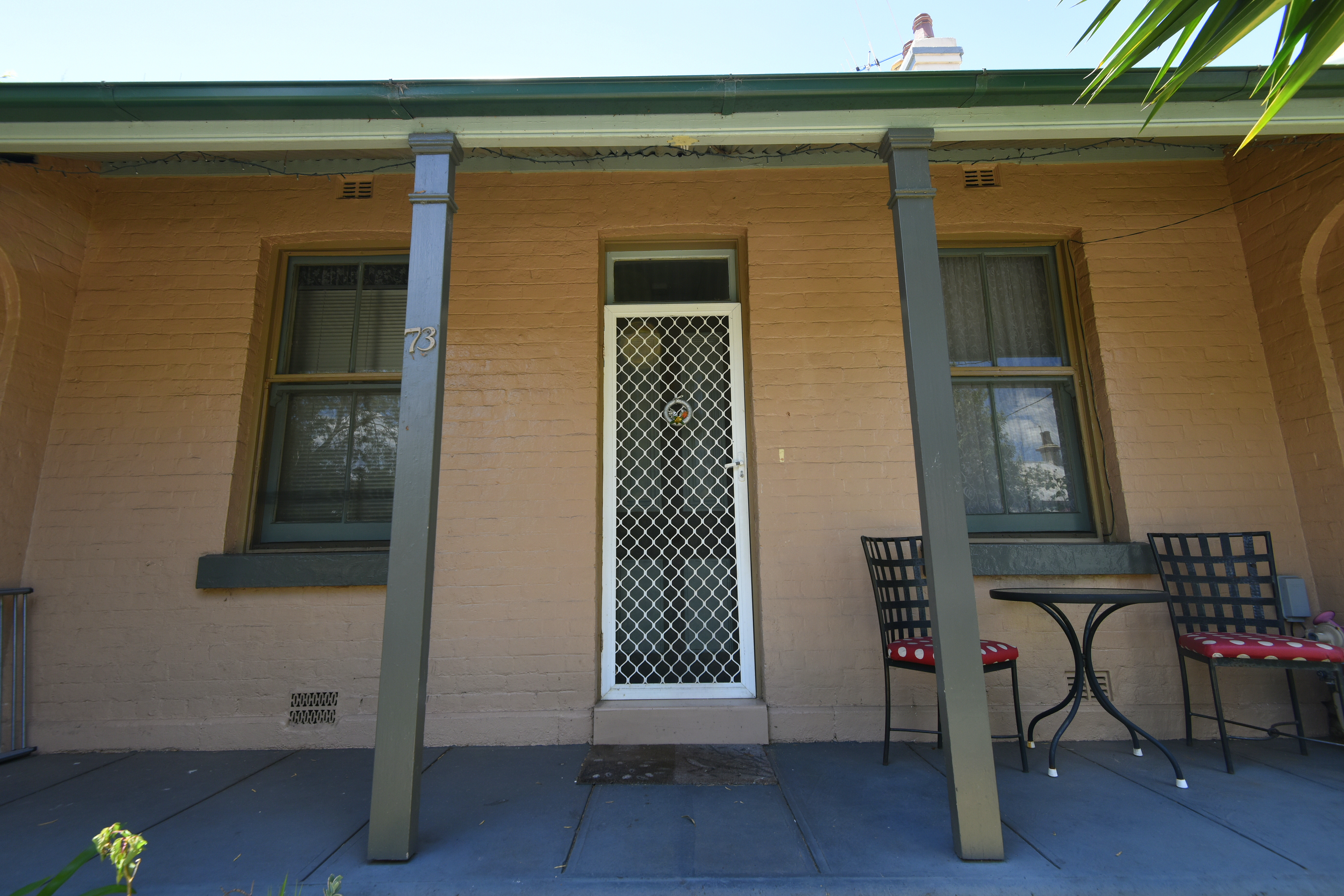
Elsie Refuge

The Elsie Refuge for women and children was a women's refuge set up in Glebe, Sydney in 1974. The project was the beginning of the NSW Women's Refuge Movement that responded to the needs of women and children escaping domestic violence by providing access to specialist accommodation and support services operating within a feminist framework.

== History ==
In November 1973, Women's Liberation activists Anne Summers and Jennifer Dakers called a meeting at Women's House in Sydney to discuss the setting up of a "refuge" to provide free accommodation for women in various distress situations. In March 1974, Summers, Dakers and other women activists, including Bessie Guthrie, Robyn Kemmis, Kris Melmouth, Margaret Power, Carol Baker, Diana Beaton, Christina Gibbeson and Trudy Brickwood squatted an abandoned property at 73-75 Westmoreland Street, Glebe and set up the refuge in response to the lack of services and support available to women and children suffering from domestic violence. It was estimated that lesbians made up about 50% of the activist staff at the Elsie Refuge and associated Rape Crisis Centre set up nearby in Glebe by Kris Melmouth.

Initially, there was no support from governments, with the staff at the centre providing security with nothing more than a cricket bat. They were one of a number of activist groups who squatted in derelict houses in the Anglican Church owned "Glebe Estate" in the pathway of a proposed freeway, part of which was to pass through the area. The building, along with the other 700 dwellings on Glebe Estate, was purchased from the Anglican Church by the Whitlam government in 1974 and the refuge was granted a lease. The Whitlam government established the Department of Urban and Regional Development, which fought back against the proposed expressway and redevelopment projects, and provided funding for the refuge. Later the refuge was moved to larger premises in nearby Derwent Street.

Although crisis accommodation for women had been available for a long time, it was very limited. Elsie Refuge and its feminist counterparts were the first to run a service from a feminist perspective that focused on helping women escape domestic violence.

The management of Elsie Women's Refuge was handed over to the St Vincent de Paul Society in August 2014. The records of the Elsie Women's Refuge for the years 1974-2014 are held in the collection of the State Library of New South Wales.

== In popular culture ==
The Stray Dags, an Australian all-female post-punk Australian band based in Sydney, wrote and performed a song about the refuge, titled "Elsie Blues", which they sang at their first live gig at the Toucan Cafe in Glebe in 1979.

== See also ==
- NSW Women's Refuge Movement
