= Social franchising =

Adaptation of commercial franchising for achieving social gains

Social franchising is the application of commercial franchising concepts to achieve socially beneficial ends, rather than profit.

== Overview ==
Social franchising is the application of the principles of commercial franchising to promote social benefit rather than private profit.

In the first sense, it refers to a contractual relationship wherein an independent coordinating organization (usually a non-governmental organization, but occasionally a governmental body or private company) offers individual independent operators the ability to join into a franchise network for the provision of selected services over a specified area in accordance with an overall blueprint devised by the franchisor. Once joining the network, operators are given the right to employ previously tested incentives including: professional training, use of brands or brand advertisements, subsidized or proprietary supplies and equipment, support services, and access to professional advice. Members also gain beneficial spin-off effects such as increased consumer volume and improved reputation due to brand affiliation. Franchisees must adhere to a range of requirements including: providing socially beneficial services, meeting quality and pricing standards, undergoing mandatory education on provision of services, subjecting outlets to quality assurance mechanisms, reporting service and sales statistics, and occasionally, paying fixed or profit-share fees. Social franchises have been used for primary health services, pharmaceutical sales of essential drugs, HIV testing and counseling, and reproductive health services in the developing world.

A second application of social franchising is as a means of enabling social enterprises and the social economy to create more employment for disadvantaged people and achieve social aims. This is done principally by enabling joint working and knowledge sharing and transfer. The European Social Franchising Network has identified over 60 social franchises of this type in Europe, which employ over 13,000 people and more recently in 2012 The International Centre for Social Franchising identified 140. The largest of these is De Kringwinkel in Flanders employing 5,000 people. Others, like the Le Mat hotel and tourism social franchise or the School for Social Entrepreneurs operate in more than one country. Social franchising provides an opportunity to rapidly grow the sector to the benefit of disadvantaged people and society more generally.

== Support Organisations ==
The international Centre for Social Franchising (ICSF) was founded to help replicate proven social ventures to scale. They have a number of useful resources and have published papers such as Investing in Social Franchising which looks at the viability of investment into franchised social enterprise in the UK and Social Franchising: Innovation and the Power of Old Ideas which is a comparison between McDonald's and the social franchise Foodbank.

The ICSF has recently (2015) developed and launched a social franchising toolkit with NESTA, Bertelsmann Foundation, London School of Economics and others to help the best social ideas develop as a franchise. The group recently carried out research into replicable health care models with significant social benefit with GlaxoSmithKline the pharmaceutical company, published in May 2013.

== Social franchising for health services ==
There are a number of social franchising set ups in the area of health care and social mobility. According to the components of Human Development Index, "Health" and "Living Standards" are the two major components of HDI (Human Development Index). Social franchising for essential health services is an emerging technique used by governments and aid-donors in developing countries where a substantial percentage of health services are provided by private sector (including non-profit NGOs and private for-profit) to improve access, equity, effectiveness, and quality. Clinical franchising often takes the form of a fractional model where franchised services are added to an existing medical practice, but also can exist as a stand-alone practice wherein the site exclusively provides franchise supported services or commodities. Social franchising has been used to deliver a wide range of services including DOTS tuberculosis treatment, sexual transmitted infection management, primary care, and HIV / AIDS treatment.

== Strengths and weaknesses of social franchising ==
=== Strengths ===
By organizing small independent providers into larger units, social franchises can yield returns to scale in investment in physical capital, supply chains, advertising, and worker training and supervision. Additionally, social franchises can offer the ability to: faster scale up programs, decrease transaction costs, provide uniform services to a broad market, collectively negotiate financial reimbursement mechanisms, and replicate best practice services among a large group. Franchisees can also cross-subsidize less profitable services with the more profitable ones supported by the franchisor. The use of brand advertising makes social franchising compatible with social marketing. In addition, social franchising for health services allows an expansion of services because of cross-subsidization, addition of less-profitable services if fractionally franchised, and access to costly medicines if subsidized by the coordinating organization.

=== Weaknesses ===
Several inherent logistical and economic weaknesses are present within the social franchising model. These include the difficulty in standardizing medical care among participants, the need for networks to be sufficiently large to attain an economy of scale, the cost and challenge of regulatory oversight of outlets, and the need to base organizational decisions on the population demand which may not maximize quality or minimize cost. There also exists the possibility of "tragedy of the commons" wherein franchisees provide low quality, low cost due to incomplete monitoring. Social franchising for health services runs the risk of overly procedural, "cookie cutter" medical provision, overtreatment of disease conditions, and the possibility of fraud if oversight is not present.

== Social Franchise Enterprises ==
The Social Franchise Enterprise is a type of Social initiative directed to achieve development goals through private ventures that provide goods and services to unserved markets, at a viable price. The Social Franchise enterprise creates self sustainable economic activity for the franchisees by using the franchise model to provide them with Capacity Building (know-how & training), Access to Market (bulk procurement of standard supplies, network clients, brand) and Access to Credit (benchmarking leading to Bankability). Franchisees then become capable to supply a given population with much needed goods or services.

By maintaining the transaction element, the Social Franchise Enterprise generates the revenue to both the Franchisees and to the Social Franchiser, who becomes self sustainable and can further extend its footprint and further supply unserved markets, enforce monitoring and continue to provide added value services to the Franchisees network.

Telephone/communication kiosks have been studied by the WB since 1995. Currently, rural electrification and rural mobile providers represent attractive fields to develop Social Franchise Enterprises that create economic activity and provide communities with electricity and access to communications.

== History of Social Franchise Programs ==
The first significant implementation of social franchising was conducted in 1995 by the Greenstar franchise in Pakistan. Since its inception, Greenstar has trained over 24,000 providers, and provides family planning, sexual and reproductive health services, maternal and child health services, and tuberculosis diagnosis and treatment through over 80,000 retail outlets. Since then, over 35 additional social franchise programs have arisen, with much of the increase in the number and size of social franchises occurring in the last four years. Franchises have additionally expanded their services from mostly family planning to testing and treatment of malaria, tuberculosis, and HIV / AIDS.

=== Existing Clinical Social Franchises ===
Franchise Name	Country	Coordinating Organization	Date Founded	Number of Clinics	Family Planning	HIV	Sexual and Reproductive Health	Maternal and Child Health	Tuberculosis	Malaria	Other
AMUA	Kenya	Marie Stopes International	2004	144	Yes						
Andalan	Indonesia	DKT International	2001	5,000	Yes		Yes	Yes			
ARV Care	South Africa	BroadReach	2002	4500		Yes					Yes
Biruh Tesfa	Ethiopia	Pathfinder International	2000	130	Yes		Yes				Yes
Blue Star (Bangladesh)	Bangladesh	Social Marketing Company	1998	3600	Yes						
BlueStar (Ethiopia)	Ethiopia	Marie Stopes International	2007	107	Yes		Yes				
BlueStar (Ghana)	Ghana	Marie Stopes International	2008	102	Yes		Yes				
BlueStar (Malawi)	Malawi	Marie Stopes International	2008	59	Yes	Yes	Yes				
BlueStar (Philippines)	Philippines	Marie Stopes International	2007	66	Yes		Yes				
BlueStar (Sierra Leone)	Sierra Leone	Marie Stopes International	2008	70	Yes						
BlueStar (Vietnam)	Vietnam	Marie Stopes International	2007	32	Yes		Yes				
Confiance	Democratic Republic of the Congo	Population Services International	2004	78	Yes						Yes
CFWshops Kenya	Kenya	Child and Family Wellness Shops CFW	2000	67		Yes	Yes	Yes			
CFWshops Rwanda	Rwanda	Child and Family Wellness Shops CFW	2008	2		Yes	Yes				
DiMPA Network	India	PSP-One	1998	1150	Yes						
FriendlyCare (Philippines)	Philippines	FriendlyCare	1999	6	Yes						Yes
Greenstar	Pakistan	Population Services International	1995	8000	Yes		Yes	Yes	Yes		
Gold Star	Kenya	Family Health International	2006	279	Yes	Yes			Yes	Yes	Yes
Merrygold Health	India	Hindustan Latex FP Trust	2007		Yes		Yes	Yes	Yes		
Intimo	Mozambique	DKT International	2011	9	Yes	Yes	Yes				
Key Clinics	India	Population Services International	2004	701			Yes		Yes		
K-Met (Kenya)	Kenya	K-MET	1995	200	Yes		Yes				
Mexico (Community Doctors Program	Mexico	Mexfam	1986	300	Yes						
New Start (South Africa)	South Africa	Population Services International	2007	11		Yes					
New Start (Lesotho)	Lesotho	Population Services International	2004	6		Yes					
New Start (Swaziland)	Swaziland	Population Services International	2003	16	Yes	Yes					
New Start (Zambia)	Zambia	Population Services International	2002	8	Yes						
New Start (Zimbabwe)	Zimbabwe	Population Services International	1999	41	Yes	Yes			Yes		
POPSHOPS	Philippines	DKT International	2005	300	Yes		Yes				
Operation Light House	India	Population Services International	2002	12		Yes					
ProFam (Benin)	Benin	Population Services International	2004	30	Yes		Yes	Yes		Yes	
ProFam (Cameroon)	Cameroon	Population Services International	2004	25	Yes	Yes					
ProFam (Mali)	Mali	Population Services International	2005	33	Yes						
PSI Togo	Togo	Population Services International	2002	13		Yes					
PSI Uganda	Uganda	Population Services International	2007	2		Yes					
RedPlan Salud	Peru	INPPARES	2002	1668	Yes	Yes	Yes	Yes			Yes
Sahath Al-om (MotherHealth)	Sudan	DKT International	2011	12	Yes		Yes				
Sangini	Nepal	Nepal CRS Company	1994	2928	Yes		Yes	Yes		Yes	
SkyHealth / SkyCare Centres	India	World Health Partners	2008		Yes		Yes				Yes
Smiling Sun	Bangladesh	Chemonics International	2008	40	Yes			Yes			Yes
Society for Family Health	Nigeria	Population Services International	2006		Yes		Yes		Yes		Yes
Sun Quality Health (Myanmar)	Myanmar	Population Services International	2001	846	Yes		Yes			Yes	Yes
Sun Quality Health (Cambodia)	Cambodia	Population Services International	2002	164	Yes		Yes			Yes	Yes
Surya Clinics	India	Janani/DKT International	2000	63	Yes		Yes				Yes
Top Reseau	Madagascar	Population Services International	2001	155	Yes	Yes	Yes				
Well-Family Midwife Clinics	Philippines	Well-Family Midwife Clinic	1997	100	Yes			Yes			
Vitaloc Station	Hong Kong	Vitaloc Station	2012	3							Yes
