= Wild Secrets =

- Founded: 1993
- Founder: Gerrard Giummarra
- Area served: Australia, New Zealand
- Website: https://www.wildsecrets.com.au/

Wild Secrets is an online retailer of sex toys, condoms and intimate wear for men, women and couples in Australia and New Zealand.

Wild Secrets is the flagship store of PHE International PTY LTD (trading as Excite Online Services) PHE International operates from its combined office and warehouse space in Australia and is the Australian subsidiary of PHE, Inc., which was founded in 1971 by Phil Harvey and is the parent company of Adam & Eve, one of the largest online distributor of sex toys, condoms and lingerie in the United States of America.

== Origins ==
Wild Secrets was founded by online entrepreneur Gerrard Giummarra under his online retail empire IBSA, established in 1993.

Giumarra's first online venture was propertyseeker.com.au, which he started as a means to display projects following his work as an architectural designer in the 1980s. When Giumarra began working with two IT developers who owned the domain realestate.com.au in 1991, he suggested a merger. Realestate.com.au, now REA Group Ltd (REA), provides online and app-based property and property-related services across Australia and Asia.

In 1998, Giumarra sold his interests in propertyseeker.com.au and realestate.com.au, and founded IBSA. Under IBSA, Giumarra founded Wild Secrets and its sister companies followed in 2007 by bikeexchage.com.au, Australia's biggest online marketplace for cyclists. He sold his stake in the company in 2012.

Excite Online Services, its Wild Secrets flagship and sister stores were acquired by PHE, Inc. in 2019.

Wild Secrets’ own brand of sexual wellness products was launched in 2020.

== Philanthropy ==
Wild Secrets closely aligns with the humanitarian values of its parent company PHE, Inc. The parent enterprise is involved in philanthropic work such as disease control, sex education and family planning in developing countries through Population Services International and DKT International.

- In 2019, Wild Secrets formed a partnership with cancer vanquishing charity Love Your Sister, co-founded by award-winning Australian actor Samuel Johnson OAM.
- In January 2020, Wild Secrets and PHE, Inc. individually donated to the Australian Red Cross Disaster Relief and Recovery Fund, and the Gippsland Emergency Relief Fund, to help those affected by Australia's devastating bushfire crisis of 2019–20.

== Media Exposure ==
Wild Secrets has featured in web, print and broadcast media for its successes, educational campaigns and charity fundraising.

- In February 2019, Wild Secrets received media attention for the acquisition of Excite Online Services by PHE, Inc. The acquisition received further coverage in a piece on the retirement of Bob Christian, former Adam & Eve Director of New Business Development and President of Adam & Eve Retail Stores.
- In June 2019, the appointment of Will Dobbyn, former executive from major sports apparel brand 2XU, as Wild Secrets General Manager made news.
- In January 2020, Wild Secrets featured in several publications for its exclusive hotel sex toy delivery offer for Valentine's Day.
- Wild Secrets campaign ‘Go F*ck Yourself (for everyone’s sake)’, encouraging adults to use sex toys to break the boredom of self-isolation during COVID-19, was covered in the media.

In addition, Wild Secrets has featured in Australian mainstream and LGBTQI+ media for its charity fundraising and sexual wellness advice.

Broadcast appearances have included The Morning Show television program, Now To Love online magazine platform and Joy 94.9 community radio's Saturday Magazine radio show.
