= USAID v. Alliance for Open Society =

Agency for International Development v. Alliance for Open Society International may refer to either of two United States Supreme Court cases:

- USAID v. Alliance for Open Society (2013) (alternatively called Alliance for Open Society I), 570 U.S. 205 (2013), a case in which the Court ruled that conditions imposed on an organization receiving federal grants restricted the freedom of speech.
- USAID v. Alliance for Open Society (2020) (alternatively called Alliance for Open Society II), 591 U.S. ___ (2020), a case in which the Court upheld those same conditions on the organization's foreign affiliates.

== See also ==
- List of United States Supreme Court cases
- Lists of United States Supreme Court cases by volume
