= Five & Alive =

International initiative against preventable disease

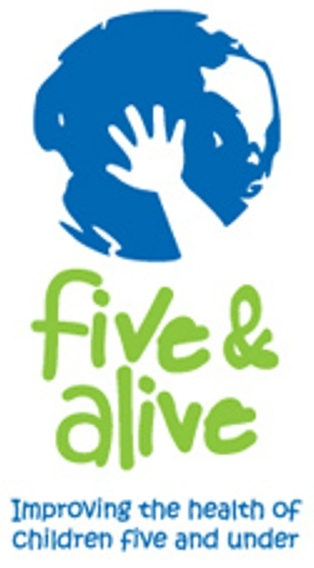
- Founded: 2007
- Founder: Kate Roberts
- Tax ID no.: 56-0942853
- Purpose: Humanitarian
- Location: Washington, DC
- Region served: Worldwide
- Key people: Kate Roberts; Karl W. Hofmann
- Revenue: $417,470,056 (as of 2008)
- Employees: 101–500
- Website: psi.org/five-alive

Five & Alive is an international fundraising and awareness initiative of Population Services International (PSI). The initiative is focused on education and treatment of preventable diseases.

== History ==
Five & Alive was established by Kate Roberts in 2007 as a subsidiary program of Population Services International, where she serves as Vice President of Corporate Marketing and Communications. The health program is a collaborative initiative of YouthAIDS, an HIV/AIDS prevention program of PSI.

== Programs ==
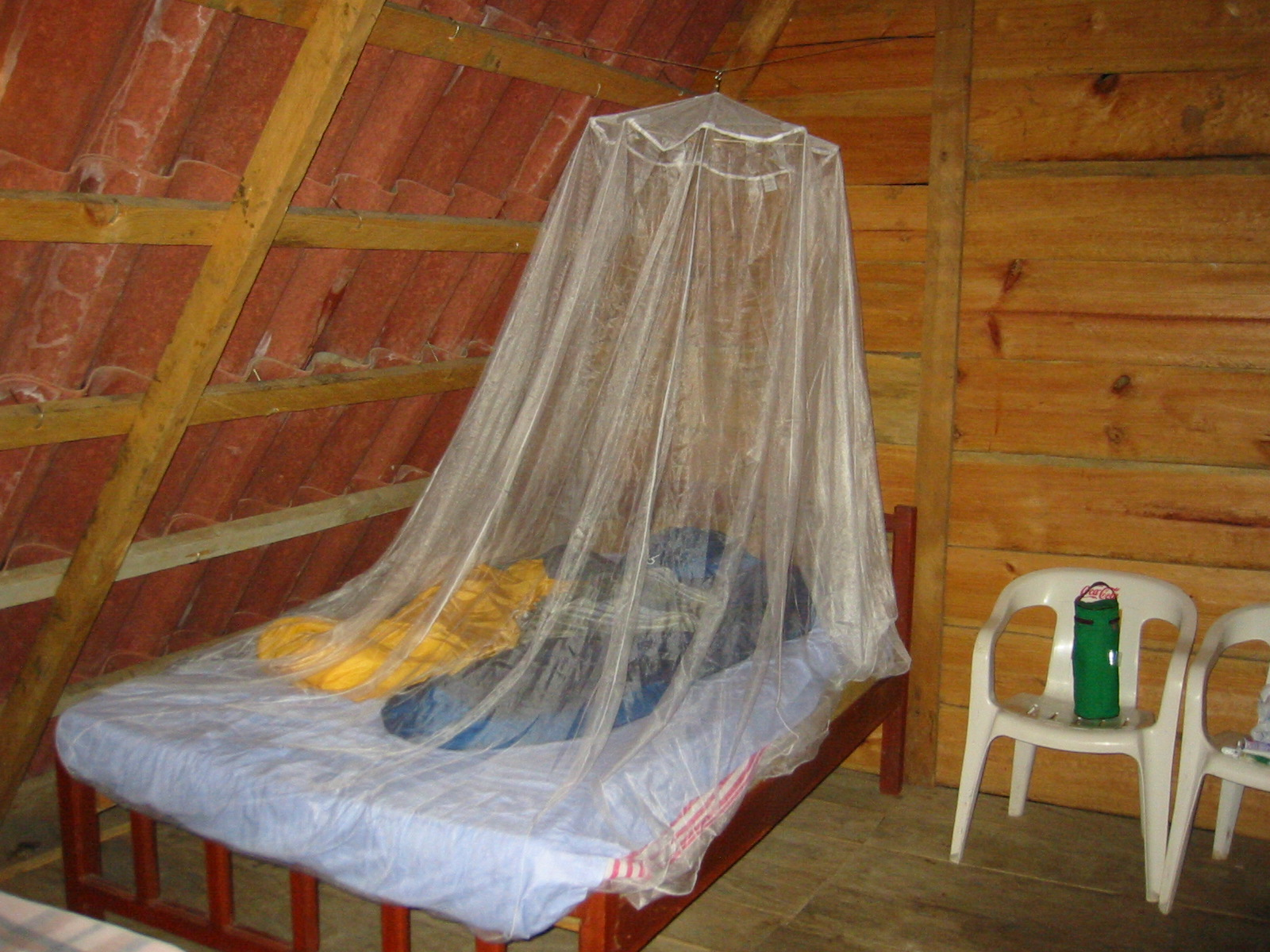
Mosquito net attached to the ceiling

=== Infectious diseases treatment ===
Five & Alive water-treated products include a sodium hypochlorite-based water solution, chlorine-based tablets, and a flocculent powder for people to purify water at the household level. Five & Alive has promoted oral rehydration salts (ORS) and zinc supplements for children who may die from diarrhea-related dehydration. Five & Alive's pre-packaged therapy kits that contain cotrimoxazole were provided through private sector clinics to treat pneumonia in children under five.

=== Healthcare services ===
Five & Alive has estimated that over 3.5 million deaths of mothers and children have occurred due to malnutrition, or "undernutrition", and has stated that for children, ensuring access to health and nutritional sustenance during the first 1,000 days from conception to age two can break the cycle of malnutrition.

Five & Alive provided services include ensuring access to immunization and vaccination, and water and sanitation. Five & Alive promotes a set of interventions.

== Partnerships ==
Five & Alive collaborated with the magazine Condé Nast Traveler, in which they offered financial support through their Five & Alive Fund in addition to print coverage in support of Five & Alive's marketing campaigns. Assistance has included the distribution of child survival packages in Uganda and assistance in training healthcare workers to provide diagnoses and treatments to children in Cameroon.

Partnerships with Blackberry Farm and The Inn at Little Washington have led to several fundraising events. Appetite for Life dinners at Blackberry Farm in 2009 and 2010 raised money towards Five & Alive's initiatives in Haiti, while events at the Inn at Little Washington raised a significant amount.
