= Marie Stopes Ethiopia =

Health services provider

- Headquarters: Addis Ababa
- Region served: Ethiopia
- Services: Sexual and reproductive health services
- Parent organization: MSI Reproductive Choices
- Website: mariestopes.org.et

Marie Stopes Ethiopia is a non-profit organization based in Ethiopia. Established in 1990, it provides sexual and reproductive health services, with a strong focus on family planning, maternal and child health, safe abortion and post-abortion care where permitted, and HIV/AIDS related services. They have 20 static centres across Ethiopia with their head center at Addis Ababa. These are permanent clinics offering regular hours and a variety of services.

As of 2022, MRE and the Family Guidance Association of Ethiopia (FGAE) were the two largest NGOS in the country which provided sexual and reproductive health services.

== Services and impact ==
In 2012, an MRE clinic in Addis Ababa saw 13,000 patients, of whom around 8,500 were seeking abortions.

MRE has not complied with the global gag rule placed on abortion counseling and referrals, preventing it from receiving financial funding from the U.S. government. Following the 2017 reinstatement of the rule, the loss of USAID funds forced MRE to end services that provided premament contraception (vasectomies and tubal ligations).

== Studies involving Maria Stopes Ethiopia ==
- Nuccio, Olivia; Sendek, Birhanu; Park, Min Hae; Mesele, Tesfaye; Okello, Francis Ogojo; Gordon-Maclean, Cristin (2016-12-19). "Optimizing tubal ligation service delivery: a prospective cohort study to measure the task-sharing experience of Marie Stopes International Ethiopia". Health Policy and Planning czw105. doi:10.1093/heapol/czw105. ISSN 0268-1080.
- Alemayehu, Bethelihem; Addissie, Adamu; Ayele, Wondimu; Tiroro, Sisay; Woldeyohannes, Demelash (2019-06-04). "Magnitude and associated factors of repeat induced abortion among reproductive age group women who seeks abortion Care Services at Marie Stopes International Ethiopia Clinics in Addis Ababa, Ethiopia". Reproductive Health. 16 (1): 76. doi:10.1186/s12978-019-0743-4. ISSN 1742-4755. PMC 6549259. PMID 31164156.
- Girma, Daniel; Aman, Haji; Ejara, Daba (2024-07-16), The Magnitude of Early Discontinuation of Intrauterine Contraceptive Device Use and Associated Factors among Clients at Marie Stopes Maternal and Child Health Center, Adama, Ethiopia, doi:10.21203/rs.3.rs-4539024/v1
