= Sexual and reproductive health among adolescents in Niger =

Despite the implementation of various interventions to improve adolescent Sexual and Reproductive Health (ASRH) in developing countries such as Niger, ASRH indicators remain poor. Limited research has explored why these interventions have not achieved their intended outcomes.

Contraceptive use among adolescents remains low in many developing countries, particularly in West Africa and Central Africa, where only about 14.4% of sexually active adolescents use contraception. In Niger, the rate is even lower at approximately 6%. This limited use contributes to high rates of teenage pregnancy and increases the risk of sexually transmitted infections, including HIV/AIDS. Given these challenges, there is a growing need for effective, evidence-based interventions to support adolescents' sexual and reproductive health. Previous research has mainly evaluated the effectiveness, implementation, and impact of ASRH interventions using both quantitative and qualitative approaches.

== Age of consent ==
An information board about AIDS "Stop SIDA! Preservez vous". A man in western clothing and a Tuareg woman in local clothing with earrings, necklace and bracelet each show a condom.

The age of consent in Niger is 13 years old for heterosexuals. Homosexuality has been criminalized since 2026.

== Adolescent Sexual and Reproductive Health (ASRH) in Niger before 1994 ==
Before 1994, Adolescent Sexual and Reproductive Health received limited attention in most developing countries. Instead, reproductive health efforts primarily focused on family planning, largely influenced by the rise of feminist movements during the 1970s. It was not until the 1994 International Conference on Population and Development (ICPD) in Cairo that Adolescent Sexual and Reproductive Health was recognized as a major public health priority in developing countries.

In response to the rising incidence of adolescent pregnancies, particularly among schoolgirls, President Seyni Kountché launched the Matameye Appeal in 1985, urging parents and education authorities to take greater responsibility for the welfare of adolescents. The government also revitalized the "Samarias" youth system, expanding it nationwide as a platform for educational, recreational, and awareness activities targeting young people. Through seminars and community engagement, the initiative promoted discussions on adolescent issues and contributed to making Adolescent Sexual and Reproductive Health (ASRH) a government priority. In 1988, Niger established the National Centre for Family Health, which supported national population policies aimed at reducing maternal and infant mortality. This effort culminated in the implementation of the National Family Planning Programme (NSFP), which focused on improving family planning services and indicators between 1984 and 1994. During this period, the country introduced its first nationwide family planning service delivery model and, in 1988, enacted legislation permitting voluntary contraceptive use, including for unmarried individuals. However, the law imposed significant restrictions on certain contraceptive methods. For example, women seeking tubal ligation were required to obtain their husband's consent, be at least 35 years old, and have a minimum of four children, limiting equitable access to reproductive health services.

== Adolescence Sexual and Reproductive Health (ASRH) after 1994 ==
Following the 1994 International Conference on Population and Development (ICPD) in Cairo, many developing countries, including Niger, shifted from a narrow focus on family planning to a broader reproductive health (RH) approach. In response, Niger strengthened its reproductive health system by establishing the National Reproductive Health Centre in 1995, replacing the National Family Health Centre. The new institution was mandated to serve as the country's leading center for reproductive health training, research, and service delivery in line with the ICPD agenda. In 1995, Niger established the Reproductive Health Department within the Ministry of Public Health to implement the recommendations of the International Conference on Population and Development (ICPD). The government developed national reproductive health standards and integrated reproductive health into health training curricula. A national symposium also adopted a standardized definition of reproductive health, encompassing the well-being of women, children, adolescents, young people, and men. The expanded reproductive health framework aimed to promote family planning, safe motherhood, child health, adolescent health, and the prevention of STIs, HIV/AIDS, and reproductive cancers. However, the broad scope of these services stretched the country's already limited resources.

Beginning in 2000, Niger launched the Youth Initiative Project for Adolescent Sexual and Reproductive Health, which established adolescent- and youth-friendly centres in selected regions to improve access to sexual and reproductive health (SRH) services. In 2005, the government, through the Ministry of Youth and with support from the United Nations Population Fund (UNFPA), expanded these efforts by establishing youth and adolescent counselling centres across all regions of the country. These centres provided recreational activities, counselling, and education on sexual and reproductive health to promote informed decision-making and healthier behaviours among adolescents and young people. These initiatives improved adolescents' awareness of sexual and reproductive health and its consequences. However, utilization of the centres remained low due to prevailing social and cultural barriers, as well as the absence of a supportive legal framework. To address these challenges, the Government of Niger enacted Law No. 2006-16 on 21 June 2006, formally recognizing and guaranteeing the right of all citizens to sexual and reproductive health services. The 2006 Reproductive Health Law (Law No. 2006-16) established reproductive health as a fundamental human right, guaranteeing equal access to reproductive health services without discrimination based on age, sex, religion, ethnicity, marital status, or other personal characteristics. It also emphasized the shared responsibility of individuals and couples to protect and promote reproductive health rights. To improve adolescent access to these services, the Government of Niger established the Division of Sexual and Reproductive Health for Adolescents and Young People and, with support from the United Nations Population Fund (UNFPA), implemented the Adolescent-Friendly Services Programme (2006–2012). Through this initiative, more than 47 public health facilities were designated and equipped to provide adolescent-friendly sexual and reproductive health services.

Although the Adolescent-Friendly Services Programme (2006–2012) proved effective, it was not expanded nationwide after 2012 because of resource constraints. The initial 47 adolescent-friendly health facilities remained operational until 2018, when plans were made to increase the number to 69. However, this expansion was postponed following the outbreak of the COVID-19 pandemic, delaying implementation until 2022.

To further strengthen adolescent sexual and reproductive health (ASRH), Niger incorporated adolescent-specific priorities into the National Reproductive Health Plan (2012–2020), focusing on improving access to health information and services, creating a supportive environment, and strengthening ASRH programme management. These efforts were reinforced by the 2017–2021 Strategic Plan, which introduced annual training for healthcare providers on adolescent-friendly services through partnerships with the United Nations Population Fund (UNFPA), the World Bank, Pathfinder International, and the World Health Organization (WHO). Since 2018, sexual and reproductive health education has also been integrated into secondary school curricula, while United Nations Educational, Scientific and Cultural Organization (UNESCO)-supported school clubs and adolescent health clubs have promoted SRH awareness. Despite these achievements, only eight adolescent clubs remain operational nationwide, highlighting ongoing sustainability challenges.

== See also ==
Sexual and reproductive health and rights
