= Kate Roberts (YouthAIDS) =

British humanitarian

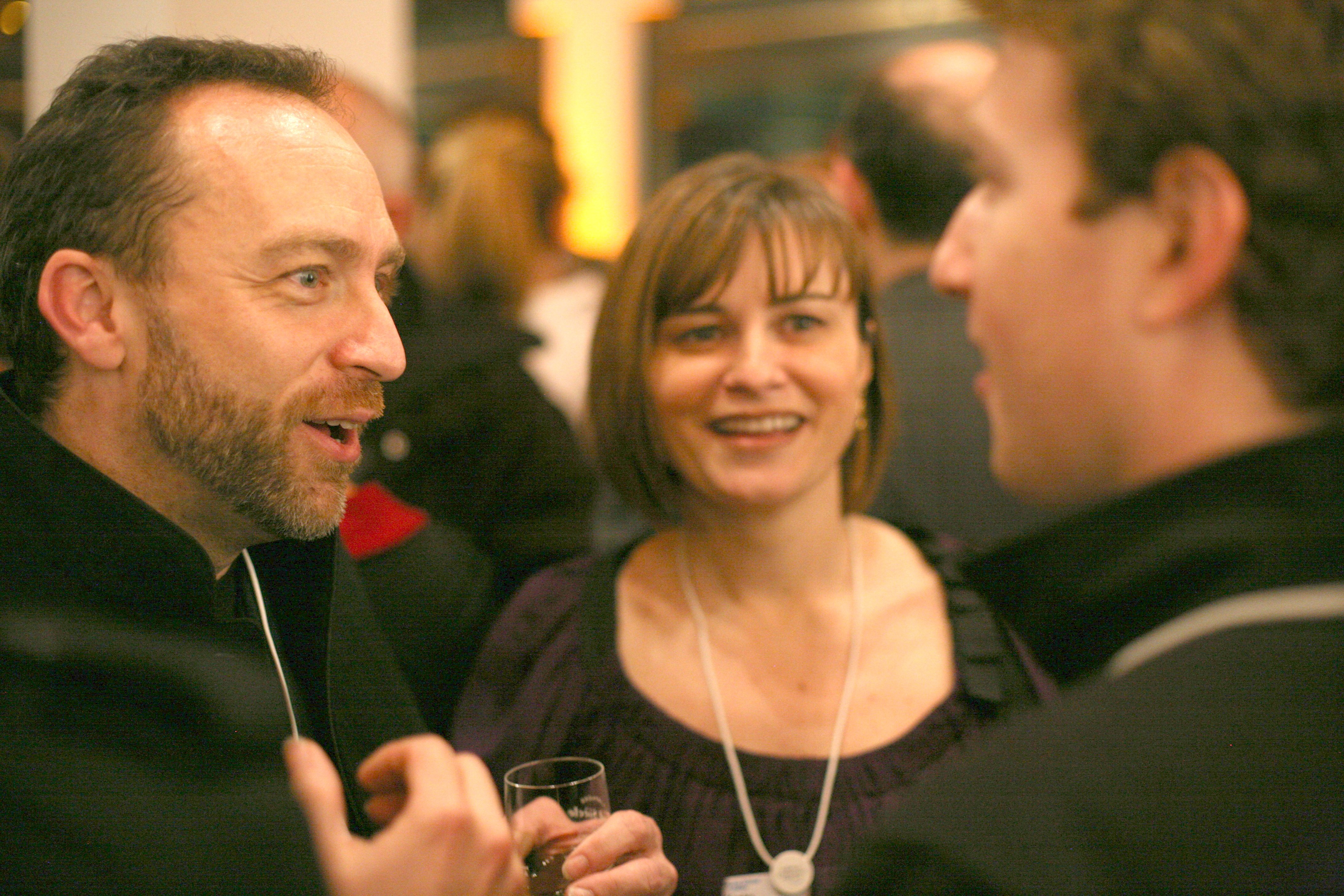
Kate Roberts, Jimmy Wales & Mark Zuckerberg (2009)

Kate Roberts is a British human rights advocate and humanitarian. She works on a global scale to develop programs and services which target malaria, child survival, HIV/AIDS, gender equality, reproductive health, and non-communicable disease. She is the co-founder of Maverick Collective, together with Mette-Marit, Crown Princess of Norway and Melinda French Gates, The Body Agency, and YouthAIDS and Five & Alive, subsidiaries of Population Services International (PSI), where she served as Senior Vice President.

Roberts hosts the podcast show; Sex Body and Soul.

== Early career ==
Roberts is originally from Southport, Merseyside in the United Kingdom, where she graduated from Southport College of Art and Technology with a City and Guilds in Hotel and Catering Management. She started her career with the hotel group, Relais et Chateau. She speaks five languages including Russian, Dutch, and Romanian. She is also an accomplished contemporary artist and interior designer.

In the early 1990s, Roberts moved to Moscow, where she worked on launching the Russian version of Cosmopolitan Magazine, before moving into work in advertising and marketing with Saatchi & Saatchi. Her work then took her to Romania where she created this country's first HIV/AIDS prevention marketing campaign that, Roberts said, "increased condom use by 100 percent in the first year". On holiday in South Africa she became aware of the scale of mortality being caused by AIDS in the country and realised that the work and strategies she had put in place in her Romanian campaign could be applied to the rest of the world. This led her to create the YouthAIDS campaign in 2001.

== Programming development ==
=== The Body Agency ===
Kate Roberts founded The Body Agency in 2020 to revolutionise access to female health products, services and education eliminating all shame and taboos. Its foundation and 501c non profit was launched in 2022 providing these services to the marginalised as well as leading the BodyNEXT campaign.

==== Sex Body and Soul Podcast ====
The Sex Body and Soul Podcast is the official podcast of The Body Agency. It takes a scientific approach to issues affecting the body, integrated with pop culture and currant affairs. Guests include medical professionals and celebrities.

=== YouthAIDS ===
Kate Roberts founded YouthAIDS in 2001 as an educational and prevention campaign for the charity Population Services International (PSI). YouthAIDS is based in Washington, DC, while being active in around 70 countries.

=== Five & Alive ===
After the success of YouthAIDS, Roberts started another PSI campaign, Five & Alive, to raise money and awareness for PSI projects which target preventable disease in children under five years old.
