= DKT International =

US-based non-profit organization

DKT
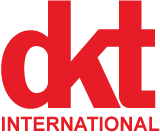
- Founded: 1989
- Founder: Phil Harvey
- Purpose: Family planning and HIV/AIDS prevention
- Location: Washington, D.C., United States
- Region served: Sub-Saharan Africa, Middle East and North Africa, Asia, Latin America
- Method: Social marketing of family planning and HIV/AIDS products and services
- President & CEO: Christopher Purdy
- Revenue: US $304.4 million (2024)
- Website: dktinternational.org

DKT International (DKT) is a charitable non-profit organization that promotes family planning and HIV prevention through social marketing. The Washington, D.C.–based DKT was founded in 1989 by Phil Harvey and operates in over 100 countries in Africa, Asia, and Latin America. Its revenue largely comes from sales of low-cost contraceptives. In 2025, DKT sold 1 billion condoms, 136.6 million units of oral contraceptives, 37.3 million injectable contraceptives, 34.3 million emergency contraceptives and 6 million intrauterine devices (IUDs), among other products, in over 100 countries. This is equivalent to 70 million couple years of protection (CYPs), making DKT one of the largest private providers of contraceptives in the developing world. The average cost per CYP is below US$1. DKT's marketing strategies have included advertising, creating location-specific brands, working with social networks and militaries, and targeting high-risk groups. DKT also works with health workers and clinics that provide family planning products, information, and services. Charity Navigator has given DKT a four-star rating for its finances. In 2024, 52.3% of DKT's expenses went to program costs, 44% to the cost of contraceptives, 1.6% to headquarters expenses, and 0.2% to fundraising.

== History ==
Phil Harvey, the founder of DKT, became interested in family planning in 1968 while working on emergency food relief for CARE International in India. In 1970, he and his fellow University of North Carolina student Tim Black founded the business Adam & Eve in order to finance their charitable activities, and also founded the non-profit health organization Population Services International that same year. DKT International, named for D.K. Tyagi, an early pioneer of family planning in India, was founded in 1989. DKT has grown rapidly over the years; its revenue from selling contraceptives increased from US$4.5 million in 1996 to $167.7 million in 2020, and its couple years of protection increased from 5.7 million in 2002 to 70 million in 2025.

In 2006, DKT International refused to take the U.S. government's anti-prostitution pledge, feeling the pledge would interfere with its HIV/AIDS services worldwide. DKT challenged the pledge as a violation of First Amendment rights, with the support of the American Civil Liberties Union (ACLU). Judge Emmet G. Sullivan ruled in favor of DKT in the District Court for the District of Columbia on 18 May 2006, but the D.C. Court of Appeals reversed the decision on 27 February 2007.

In 2013, a different organization successfully challenged the pledge before the U.S. Supreme Court in Agency for International Development v. Alliance for Open Society International, Inc.

== Organization ==
On 31 December 2013, Phil Harvey stepped down as president after 24 years, and was replaced by Christopher Purdy. Its board includes Carlos Garcia, Karen Pak Oppenheimer, Christopher H. Purdy, Dr. Matthew Reeves, Julie Stewart, and Emeritus board member Robert L. Ciszewski. Purdy also is CEO of DKT International.

In 2020, 66.8% of DKT's revenue was from contraceptive sales and related services, 26.7% from grants and contracts and 6.5% from other income. 52.2% of expenses were related to program costs, 44.a% to contraceptive costs, 1.4% to headquarters, 0.3% to fundraising and 2.1% to other expenses. Revenue from contraceptive sales first exceeded donor support in 2005.

In 2024, 76.6% of DKT's revenue was from contraceptive sales and related services, 16.2% from grants and contributions, and 7.2% from investment and other income. Total revenue and support was $304.4 million against total expenses of $293.6 million. Revenue from contraceptive sales first exceeded donor support in 2005.

For its first 26 years, DKT established stand-alone programs in each country and focused on countries with large markets, such as Ethiopia, Brazil and the Philippines. Eventually, though, DKT managers saw the benefits of a regional approach that can serve the reproductive health needs of multiple countries, including smaller ones. Therefore, DKT established its first regional program in French-speaking West and Central Africa in 2015. Since then, DKT has established six other regional platforms with two or more countries. These programs require fewer financial resources per country (and streamlined back office support), and leverages the common language, culture and regulatory environment of the region.

== Affiliates ==
=== DKT Womancare ===
In 2017, DKT launched DKT WomanCare, a marketing and distribution platform to advance DKT's mission of providing people around the world with reproductive health options. In close partnership with manufacturers, DKT WomanCare provides global integrated supply chain and marketing support. It sells a range of reproductive health products to multilateral bodies, ministries of health, commercial entities and social marketing and family planning organizations, and supports product launches and sales with marketing and training of health providers.

In 2020, DKT launched WomanCare Academy, an eLearning platform to improve providers’ confidence and capacity to provide reproductive health services. The first module orients providers to Levoplant (a 3 year contraceptive implant) and provides step-by-step instruction on the insertion and removal process.

In 2025, DKT WomanCare sold 1.62 million manual vacuum aspiration kits, 2.1 million cannulae and 307,000+ implants in 90 countries, producing over 2 million couple years of protection. In 2025, WomanCare sold products in over 100 countries.

=== carafem ===
carafem is a nonprofit organization established by DKT International in 2013 to address challenges in reproductive and abortion care within the United States. Drawing inspiration from successful international strategies, the organization set out to address the diminishing availability of abortion providers in the U.S.

In 2015, carafem opened its first clinic in Chevy Chase, Maryland, with a mission to bridge crucial healthcare disparities. Subsequently, the organization expanded its footprint, establishing centers in Atlanta, Chicago, and Nashville. Carafem offers telehealthcare options to patients in 21 states and the District of Columbia.

carafem is best known for its medically supported at-home abortion options, reaching patients in areas with limited healthcare access.

=== Women First Digital ===
Women First Digital (WFD) is an international e-health organization working in the area of sexual and reproductive health. Their mission is to provide safe and affordable abortion pills to women who want them.

WFD has three e-health platforms, ‘safe2choose’, ‘HowToUseAbortionPill’, and ‘find my method’.

safe2choose (launched in 2015) provides counseling for abortion care in multiple languages in 81 countries. Counselors communicate with patients through live chat and email.

HowToUseAbortionPill (launched in 2016) offers instructions for medical abortion in 26 languages. These guides are available for pregnancies up to 13 weeks. HowToUseAbortionPill has 57 country profiles that provide local information related to abortion, online courses for abortion seekers and providers, and an abortion chatbot available on its website as well as Facebook Messenger and WhatsApp.

find my method (launched in 2019) is a website providing information about 15+ contraceptive methods in 15 different languages.

WFD also translates its URLs into local languages for different regions. For example, safe2choose is ayudaparaabortar.org, HowToUseAbortionPill is comoabortarconpastillas.org, and find my method is guiadesexoseguro.org in Spanish-speaking countries of Latin America.

Since its creation, WFD has reached people in around 180 countries, all over Asia, Africa, and the Americas. From 2015-2022, WFD received more than 25 million website sessions; provided over 300,000 direct-to-user services for abortion care; facilitated 44,000 referrals to abortion care providers; certified 12,000 medical abortion providers; and reached over 74 million users across social media channels.

== Donors ==
As of 2026, DKT International's donors include: Gates Foundation, the Children’s Investment Fund Foundation, the Hewlett Foundation, the Packard Foundation, and the Swedish International Development Cooperation Agency (Sida) and anonymous donors.

== Programs ==
As of 2026, DKT International had 25 programs with sales in over 100 countries in Africa, Asia, and Latin America. Some initiatives serve more than one country.

Program	Geographical area	Year created	2025 CYPs
Brazil and South America	Latin America	1991	2,747,001
Democratic Republic of Congo	Africa	2009	1,941,825
DKT WomanCare	Global	2017	2,024,066
Egypt, Middle East and North Africa	Africa/Asia	2004	1,614,786
Ethiopia	Africa	1990	3,072,495
Francophone West and Central Africa	Africa	2015	1,716,699
Ghana and Anglophone West Africa	Africa	2011	1,908,974
India - Based in Bihar (Janani)	South Asia	1996	5,384,505
India - Based in Mumbai	South Asia	1992	7,200,700
Indonesia	Southeast Asia	1996	15,016,006
Iran	Middle East	2014	338,478
Kenya & East Africa	Africa	2016	2,733,820
Mexico, Central America and the Caribbean	Latin America	2003	2,562,501
Mozambique	Africa	2009	717,872
Myanmar	Southeast Asia	2014	810,550
Nigeria	Africa	2012	5,646,169
Pakistan & Afghanistan	Asia	2012	7,683,776
Philippines	Southeast Asia	1990	3,791,537
Thailand	Southeast Asia	2009	102,641
Turkey	Asia	2008	151,218
Vietnam	Southeast Asia	1993	3,166,650
