= Center for Reproductive Law & Policy v. Bush =

American legal case

- Court: United States Court of Appeals for the Second Circuit
- Full case name: The Center for Reproductive Law and Policy, Janet Benshoof, Anika Rahman, Katherine Hall Martinez, Julia Ernst, Laura Katzive, Melissa Upreti, Christina Zampas v. George W. Bush, in his official capacity as President of the United States, Colin Powell, in his official capacity as Secretary of State, Andrew Natsios, in his official capacity as Administrator of the United States Agency for International Development
- Argued: 1969
- Decided: September 13, 2002
- Citation: 304 F.3d 183 (2d Cir. 2002)

Case history
- Prior history: 2001 WL 868007 (S.D.N.Y. July 31, 2001)

Court membership
- Judges sitting: Joseph M. McLaughlin, Pierre N. Leval, Sonia Sotomayor

Case opinions
- Majority: Sotomayor

Laws applied
- First Amendment; Equal Protection Clause

Center for Reproductive Law & Policy v. Bush, 304 F.3d 183 (2d Cir. 2002), was a Court of Appeals case in the US. The case in which the United States Court of Appeals for the Second Circuit upheld the Bush Administration's re-imposition of the Mexico City Policy. The policy stated that "the United States will no longer contribute to separate nongovernmental organizations which perform or actively promote abortion as a method of family planning in other nations."

== Background ==
The Foreign Assistance Act provided the president the option of not funding abortions through the United States Agency for International Development. After the election, the George W. Bush Administration re-imposed the policy and the Center for Reproductive Law and Policy sued.

== Decision ==
The decision was written by then-Judge Sonia Sotomayor, who wrote that the policy did not constitute a violation of equal protection, as "the government is free to favor the anti-abortion position over the pro-choice position, and can do so with public funds".

== See also ==
- Chiles v. Salazar
