= Alliance for Open Society International =

US-based international nonprofit (2003–)

- Abbreviation: AOSI
- Formation: 2003
- Type: INGO
- Legal status: Foundation
- Headquarters: New York City
- Chair and President: Christopher Stone
- Treasurer: Maija Arbolino
- Secretary: A. Nicole Campbell
- Parent organization: Open Society Foundations
- Budget: $6.7 million (2012)

Alliance for Open Society International, Inc. (AOSI) is a U.S. public charity organized in 2003 under the laws of the State of Delaware.

== Origin ==
George Soros is the founder of the Open Society Foundations (OSF), the parent organization of Alliance for Open Society International (AOSI). AOSI operates as an affiliate or arm of OSF, receiving funding and support from it, though Soros holds no direct board position in AOSI itself.

== Operations ==
AOSI does not have any employees. AOSI promotes the values of open, democratic societies globally. AOSI coordinates, administers, and advises national and regional programs in Central Asia and elsewhere on a range of public health, education, and general civil society issues. It also educates the public about societies' attempts to become democratic market economies after totalitarian or authoritarian rule.

In the United States it works with the U.S. federal government on charitable projects that address challenges facing urban communities and centers. AOSI makes and receives grants in addition to cooperating with other charitable organizations to achieve these goals.

== Leadership ==
Chris Stone serves as Chair and President, Maija Arbolino serves as Member and Treasurer, and A. Nicole Campbell serves as Member and Secretary of AOSI.

== Lawsuit ==
In September 2005, AOSI sued the United States Agency for International Development and other U.S. Government agencies in response to the government extending an anti-prostitution pledge that was a component of HIV/AIDS policy during the George W. Bush administration to cover non-profit organizations based in the United States. The pledge required recipients of funding under the United States Leadership Against HIV/AIDS, Tuberculosis, and Malaria Act to state that they had a policy opposing prostitution and prohibited them from engaging in speech or activity the government deemed inconsistent with an anti-prostitution policy. The requirement covered recipient organizations as a whole, and therefore restricted speech or activity that took place outside the government-funded program and was paid for with entirely private funds. As described by the online magazine Medical News Today:

At issue in the case is a requirement that public health groups receiving U.S. funds pledge their "opposition to prostitution" in order to continue their life-saving HIV prevention work. Under this "pledge requirement", recipients of U.S. funds are forced to censor even their privately funded speech regarding the most effective ways to engage high-risk groups in HIV prevention.

Just prior to this case, the non-profit organization DKT International had brought a similar lawsuit, prevailing in District Court but losing on appeal in the United States Court of Appeals for the District of Columbia Circuit. The February 2007 ruling was based on the assumption that the government would allow speech regarding prostitution through affiliate organizations that did not receive federal funding.

With the backing of the American Civil Liberties Union, AOSI sued the United States Agency for International Development, the financial backers of its Central Asian drug rehabilitation programs. AOSI's initial co-plaintiffs were the Open Society Institute and Pathfinder International. They were joined later in the litigation by InterAction and the Global Health Council. Lawyers from the Brennan Center for Justice at New York University School of Law represented the plaintiffs.

In May 2006, Judge Victor Marrero, a federal judge of the U.S. District Court for the Southern District of New York, issued a preliminary injunction barring the government from requiring AOSI and Pathfinder International to sign the anti-prostitution pledge. The government appealed to the US Court of Appeals for the Second Circuit. During the oral argument in the case, the government stated that it intended to issue regulations that would allow legally and physically separate affiliates of recipient organizations to engage in the prohibited speech. The government issued guidelines to this effect in July 2007. In November 2007, the Court of Appeals returned the case for trial to the District Court for reconsideration in light of the new guidelines but left the injunction in place.

In August 2008, the district court held that the new guidelines did not cure the constitutional problems with the requirement. The government appealed again to the Second Circuit. While the appeal was pending, the government again revised the affiliate guidelines. In July 2011, the Second Circuit held that the requirement was unconstitutional and that the new affiliate guidelines did not cure the violation. The Supreme Court granted review in January 2013.

In 2013, the U.S. Supreme Court ruled in Agency for International Development v. Alliance for Open Society International, Inc. that the requirement was unconstitutional. The Supreme Court explained that the requirement would "plainly violate the First Amendment" if "enacted as a direct regulation of speech", and that the question in the case was whether the government could "nonetheless impose that requirement as a condition on the receipt of federal funds". The Court noted that it had previously struck down "conditions that seek to leverage funding to regulate speech outside the contours of the program itself". The Court concluded that the requirement was just such a condition because it "compel[led] as a condition of federal funding the affirmation of a belief that by its nature cannot be confined within the scope of the Government program", and therefore that the requirement violated the First Amendment. The decision is significant for its holdings on the scope of the unconstitutional conditions doctrine, and it is likely to have continuing importance for evaluating the constitutionality of government attempts to restrict speech by recipients of government funding.
