= Regulation (EC) No 1567/2003 =

European Union regulation

Regulation 1567/2003
- European Union regulation
- Title: Regulation (EC) No 1567/2003 of the European Parliament and of the Council of 15 July 2003 on aid for policies and actions on reproductive and sexual health and rights in developing countries
- Made by: European Parliament and EU Council
- Made under: Article 179 of the Treaty establishing the European Community
- Journal reference: OJ L 224, 6.9.2003, pp. 1–6

History
- Date made: 15 July 2003
- Entry into force: 9 September 2003

Regulation (EC) No 1567/2003 of the European Parliament and of the Council of 15 July 2003 on aid for policies and actions on reproductive and sexual health and rights in developing countries was passed in the European Parliament by way of the Sandbæk Report authored by Ulla Sandbæk in 2003.

Anti-abortion groups and the Catholic Church claim that the report compels all European Union member states to fund overseas abortion services through their foreign aid budgets. They claim that the language of the report, by talking of "universal access to a comprehensive range of safe and reliable reproductive and sexual health care and services", includes abortion under the World Health Organization's definition, and that Ulla Sandbæk admitted it in a radio interview.

An amendment preventing the use of European Union aid to finance abortions was defeated. The increase in funding of 150% was contrasted to a 2.3% overall increase in the aid budget.

The policy was intended, in part, to replace some of the U.S. funding lost due to the Mexico City Policy, the U.S. policy under the George W. Bush administration which prohibited funding of abortion through foreign aid, particularly reversing the defunding of the United Nations Population Fund. European Commissioner Poul Nielson said that the European Union wished to "fill the decency gap" left by the Mexico City policy.
