= Anti-prostitution pledge =

Mandated policy opposing sex trafficking

The anti-prostitution pledge is an organization-wide policy opposing prostitution and sex-trafficking that the federal government of the United States requires certain non-governmental organizations (NGOs) to adopt in order for them to receive federal anti-HIV/AIDS or anti-trafficking funds. This requirement has been in place since 2003.

The policy has been criticized as counterproductive, as it hampers enlisting those involved in the sex industry in the fight against AIDS.

Initially the requirement was only applied to foreign-based NGOs, but in 2005 the Bush administration began applying it to U.S.-based organizations as well, resulting in legal challenges on First Amendment grounds. These challenges were ultimately successful before the Supreme Court, with the 2013 decision in the case Agency for International Development v. Alliance for Open Society International. The requirement remains in effect for foreign-based NGOs that receive U.S. funds.

== Legislation and implementation ==
U.S. President George W. Bush announced the five-year $15 billion President's Emergency Plan for AIDS Relief in January 2003; Congress passed it in May 2003 under the name "United States Leadership against HIV/AIDS, Tuberculosis, and Malaria Act (Global AIDS Act)". The act identifies prostitution and sex trafficking as contributing to the spread of HIV and explicitly advances a new U.S. policy goal: the eradication of prostitution. The act states:

- "No funds ... may be used to promote or advocate the legalization or practice of prostitution or sex trafficking."
- "No funds ... may be used to provide assistance to any group or organization that does not have a policy explicitly opposing prostitution and sex trafficking."
- nothing in the anti-prostitution clause "shall be construed to preclude" services to prostitutes, including testing, care and prevention services, including condoms.

In December 2003 Congress passed the Trafficking Victims Protection Reauthorization Act which provided for funding of anti-trafficking activities, subject to the following restrictions.

- "No funds ... may be used to promote, support, or advocate the legalization or practice of prostitution."
- "No funds ... may be used to implement any program ... through any organization that has not stated in either a grant application, a grant agreement, or both, that it does not promote, support, or advocate the legalization or practice of prostitution.

The anti-prostitution pledge language in both acts was authored by Representative Chris Smith, Republican from New Jersey.

The Consolidated Appropriations Act of 2004 amended the AIDS Authorization to exempt the Global Fund to Fight AIDS, Tuberculosis and Malaria, the World Health Organization, the International AIDS Vaccine Initiative and any United Nations agency from having to sign the anti-prostitution pledge.

While the language of the legislation does not distinguish between foreign and U.S.-based organizations, the pledge was initially only enforced for the former, as the Justice Department had expressed First Amendment concerns. In September 2004, a letter from Assistant Attorney General Daniel Levin reversed this opinion, and the U.S. Agency for International Development issued a directive in June 2005 that expanded the pledge requirement to all NGOs.

A document issued by the CDC in May 2005 sought to extend the pledge requirement to the large group of organizations that receive funding through the multilateral Global Fund to Fight AIDS, Tuberculosis and Malaria (to which the U.S. contributes). This was quickly overturned by US Director of Foreign Assistance Randall L. Tobias.

== Rationale and reactions ==
In a February 2002 National Security Presidential Directive, President George W. Bush wrote: "The United States opposes prostitution and any related activities, including pimping, pandering, and/or maintaining brothels as contributing to the phenomenon of trafficking in persons. These activities are inherently harmful and dehumanizing. The United States Government's position is that these activities should not be regulated as a legitimate form of work for any human being."

In February 2005, a group of non-profit organizations including CARE, the International Rescue Committee, Save the Children and the International Center for Research on Women protested the anti-prostitution pledge policy in a letter to US Director of Foreign Assistance Randall L. Tobias. This was followed by a May 2005 protest letter to President Bush, signed by hundreds of organizations worldwide, stating that the pledge "makes it extremely difficult, if not impossible, to establish the trust necessary to provide services to these hard-to-reach groups" and it will "exacerbate stigma and discrimination against already marginalized groups."

This was countered in August 2005 by a letter to the President supporting the policy, signed by over 100 groups, including the Christian Medical Association, Concerned Women for America, Family Research Council, Focus on the Family, National Association of Evangelicals, Southern Baptist Ethics & Religious Liberty Commission, Sex Industry Survivors, The Medical Institute, The Salvation Army, World Hope International and World Relief. Supporters of the pledge requirement argued that prostitution is inherently harmful and needs to be abolished, rejected harm reduction approaches, and held that legalized prostitution increases demand for sex trafficking.

In May 2005, the Brazilian government turned down $40 million in anti-HIV/AIDS funding from the U.S. government because of the anti-prostitution pledge. Brazil's AIDS commissioner Pedro Chequer was quoted as saying: "Sex workers are part of implementing our AIDS policy and deciding how to promote it. They are our partners. How could we ask prostitutes to take a position against themselves?"

The anti-prostitution pledge has been criticized as counterproductive, because projects that work with and support prostitutes are often seen as instrumental in fighting the spread of HIV/AIDS. The Brazilian anti-AIDS program, which employs prostitutes to hand out information and free condoms, is considered by the United Nations to be the most successful in the developing world. The Sonagachi Project is a prostitutes' cooperative in Calcutta, India, that supports sex workers' rights and works to stop the spread of HIV; it has received strong positive evaluations from both UNAIDS and the World Bank, and has been cited by UNAIDS as a "best-practice" model of working with prostitutes.

Ronald Weitzer has described the anti-prostitution pledge as a symptom of what he calls the "moral crusade" against sex trafficking, resulting in a broad attack against all forms of commercial sex acts. The language of the policy juxtaposes the words "prostitution" and "sex trafficking"; it has been pointed out that it is important to clearly distinguish between these two concepts, and that all relevant organizations already strongly oppose sex trafficking.

Randall L. Tobias, the U.S. administration's foreign aid chief who was responsible for implementation of the anti-prostitution pledge, resigned in April 2007 over allegations that he had used an escort service. Some sex worker organizations and commentators called the situation "ironic" and Tobias "hypocritical".

The 2012 final report of UNDP's Global Commission on HIV and the Law denounced the anti-prostitution pledge and included the recommendation

3.2.8 Repeal punitive conditions in official development assistance—such as the United States government's PEPFAR anti-prostitution pledge and its current anti-trafficking regulations—that inhibit sex workers' access to HIV services or their ability to form organisations in their own interests.

=== Lawsuits ===
In response to the 2005 decision to apply the policy also to U.S.-based organizations, two lawsuits were filed, alleging that the policy compels or prohibits speech in violation of the First Amendment, and also prohibits actions that are exclusively privately funded.

In the first case (DKT v. USAID), the non-profit DKT International prevailed in District Court but lost on appeal, at the U.S. Court of Appeals for the D. C. Circuit. The February 2007 appeals court ruling was based on the assumption that the government would allow speech regarding prostitution as long as it is done through an affiliate that doesn't receive federal funding.

The second case (AOSI v. USAID) involved the plaintiffs Alliance for Open Society International, its affiliate the Open Society Institute, and Pathfinder International. In May 2006, a District Court in New York issued a preliminary injunction, preventing the government from requiring these organizations to sign the anti-prostitution pledge. The government appealed this injunction to the Second Circuit Court. During the oral arguments in the case, the government stated that it would allow legally and physically separate affiliates to engage in the prohibited speech. The government issued guidelines to this effect in July 2007. In November 2007, the Appeals Court rebuffed the government and let the preliminary injunction stand, returning the case to the District Court. Global Health Council and InterAction joined the case, and the District Court extended the injunction to all U.S.-based members of these organizations in August 2008. The Appeals Court, in a 2-1 decision in July 2011, affirmed the injunction and held that the anti-prostitution policy requirement "likely violates the First Amendment."

In September 2012, the Brennan Center for Justice obtained a ruling forcing the Department of Justice's Office of Legal Counsel to hand over the original February 2004 memorandum which had argued that the pledge, as applied to U.S.-based organizations, was unconstitutional.

In a 6-2 decision, the Supreme Court ruled in 2013 that the anti-prostitution pledge violated the First Amendment: the government may not leverage funding to regulate an American-based recipient's speech outside of the funded program. Later, a case regarding the pledge in the context of foreign-based recipients was heard by the Supreme Court; it ruled in 2020 that foreign-based recipients can be subject to the pledge, given the inapplicability of Amendment I to foreign nationals.

== See also ==
- Mexico City policy, forbidding U.S. funding of organizations performing abortion services
