= Ulla Sandbæk =

Danish politician

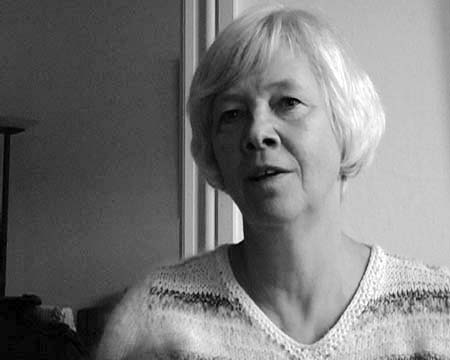
Sandbæk in 2014.

Ulla Margrethe Sandbæk (1943 – 6 September 2025) was a former Danish Member of the European Parliament for the June Movement.

She served from 1994 to 2004. She was responsible for the Sandbæk report that resulted in a European Union regulation increasing funding for the United Nations Population Fund, which controversially included funding abortion.

In 2015, she was elected to the Danish parliament for the pro-European The Alternative.
