= YouthAIDS =

US-based non-profit organization

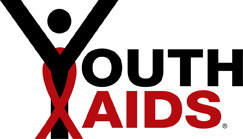
- Founder: Kate Roberts
- Type: Educational charity
- Tax ID no.: 56-0942853
- Purpose: HIV/AIDS
- Location(s): 1120 19th Street, NW, Suite 600; Washington, DC 20036
- Origins: Population Services International
- Region served: global
- Services: humanitarian aid
- Key people: Ashley Judd
- Website: psi.org/youthaids

YouthAIDS is an international nongovernmental, nonprofit education, funding, and health initiative of Population Services International (PSI) that provides humanitarian assistance and brings global awareness to the proliferation of HIV/AIDS. The organization is based in Washington, D.C., and reaches out to 600 million youth (ages 15–24) in over 60 countries through the delivery of information, products, and social services. Methods used to address issues include film, television, and radio; celebrity spokespersons; pop culture initiatives; theatrical productions; music; and sports. Actress and humanitarian Ashley Judd serves the organization as their Global Ambassador.

Population Services International and YouthAIDS partners with nongovernmental organizations and corporate entities throughout the world to develop HIV/AIDS training and awareness programs, along with opportunities for humanitarian service on global scale. Each year, YouthAIDS honors individuals that have provided exceptional humanitarian service that brings awareness to the reality of HIV/AIDS. Past recipients of the YouthAIDS Outstanding Achievement Award have included Sir Richard Branson, Sir Elton John, Annie Lennox, Judy McGrath, Nancy Pelosi, Archbishop Desmond Tutu, Senator Mary Landrieu, Senator Richard Lugar, and Bob Geldof.

== History ==
In the early 1990s, YouthAIDS founder Kate Roberts moved to Moscow, where she focused on launching the Russian version of Cosmopolitan magazine. Her work took her to Romania, where she created a global HIV/AIDS prevention marketing campaign that, Roberts said, "increased condom use by 100 percent in the first year". In 1999, while on vacation in South Africa, Roberts became aware of the high mortality rate in the country due to HIV/AIDS. One in four girls in the country were found to have contracted HIV or AIDS by age 14. Roberts recognized that the strategies that she had put in place in her Romanian campaign could be successfully applied on a global scale. In 2001, with a handful of PSI supporters, the YouthAIDS campaign was established as an initiative of Population Services International.

== Corporate partnerships ==
ALDO Shoes

In 2005, YouthAIDS partnered with Aldo Shoes to produce a public awareness and marketing campaign, entitled "Hear No Evil, See No Evil, Speak No Evil". Through the sale of empowerment tags and lapel pins featured in ads with celebrities, ALDO has generated more than $10 million through this campaign, reaching 1.5 billion people in 25 countries. The print campaign encompassed black and white images of well-known individuals photographed by Peter Lindbergh. Celebrities that have participated in the print campaign include Christina Aguilera, Salma Hayek, Cindy Crawford, Penélope Cruz, LL Cool J, Elijah Wood, Josh Lucas, and Ashley Judd.

H&M – Fashion Against AIDS

H&M's Fashion Against AIDS campaign was launched in 2008. Since their inception, they have raised over $6.5 million for HIV/AIDS prevention programs. The campaign supports HIV/AIDS awareness projects through the donation of 25 percent of the sales price of all Fashion Against AIDS garments. YouthAIDS is one of the international charities that are supported by the campaign. They have used the donations from the campaign to support a youth center in Port-au-Prince, Haiti; and establish a partnership with an organization in Mozambique that offers peer education for young men, along with counseling and HIV testing. Funds have also gone to create an HIV/AIDS and drug prevention program in Yekaterinburg, Russia, for high-risk youth.

Kiehl's

Over the course of ten years, Kiehl's, an American premium cosmetics company, has served as a major contributor of YouthAIDS, providing financial support, while developing educational programs that encourage philanthropy. In 2002 and 2005, the company reintroduced products and launched a limited edition hand and body cleanser, donating all profits to YouthAIDS. Kiehl's participated in the 15th Annual International AIDS Conference, held in 2004, in Bangkok, Thailand. YouthAIDS and Kiehl's partnered to host an educational event to present the realities of individuals affected by HIV/AIDS. Working with Asian media, they have distributed information about HIV/AIDS throughout the country. In 2006, Kiehl's established a fundraising program to encourage philanthropy among college students. The incentive campaign brought in over $50,000, by rewarding students for developing individual funding programs that raised a minimum of $1,000 for YouthAIDS. The following year, Kiehl's created a Shop for Cause program that took place at Kiehl's stores throughout the US. The program resulted in the donation of 100 percent of the net profits from all sales that took place on World AIDS Day. In 2008, Kiehl's donated 100 percent of their net profits from the sale of a specific product to YouthAIDS and other AIDS-related charities around the world.

MTV and Levi Strauss & Co.

In 2002, MTV's Staying Alive Foundation and Levi Strauss & Co., in partnership with YouthAIDS, produced two concerts entitled, "Staying Alive". The concerts were produced through the financial support of the Bill & Melinda Gates Foundation and the Paul G. Allen Family Foundation. Both Population Services International and UNAIDS (the Joint United Nations Program on HIV/AIDS), provided expertise and knowledge on the realities of HIV/AIDS. Performers included Missy Elliott, P Diddy, Michelle Branch, Dave Matthews, and Alicia Keys. One concert took place in Seattle on November 7, 2002, while the other was held in Cape Town, South Africa, on November 23, 2002. The concerts were edited and broadcast simultaneously as a 90-minute special on December 1, 2002 (World AIDS Day), in 170 countries and featured on all major news channels in Asia-Pacific, Europe, Latin America, Canada, Russia, and the US.

Roberto Coin

In 2005, Italian jewelry designer, Roberto Coin, designed a diamond-studded charm bracelet, entitled "YouthAIDS bracelet", to benefit YouthAIDS and their efforts to address and prevent the proliferation of AIDS in Africa. In subsequent years, he created additional charms to support the organization, donating half of all profits to YouthAIDS. Regarding his support, he said, "I created the charm and bracelet because they are both a statement of something personal. There is a meaning behind every charm one wears. I was very impressed by the efforts that YouthAIDS has made for the prevention of the disease in Africa and I wanted to assist in their fight against AIDS."

Cartier

In 2006, Cartier began designing the LOVE Charity bracelet, which is an exclusive version of their solid gold Love bracelet. The LOVE Charity bracelet is designed on behalf of charities throughout the world. Each charity version is designed with a different colored silk cord attached to a golden ring and inscribed with the word LOVE. The cord color of the bracelet purchased determines which of 24 charities receives a $150 contribution from the total cost of each bracelet. Each of the 24 different styles of bracelets are represented by a well-known celebrity. The proceeds from the sale of LOVE charity bracelets with maroon cords are donated to YouthAIDS, supported by actress and YouthAIDS Global Ambassador Ashley Judd.

- Johnson & Johnson
- Designers Against AIDS
- GOOD magazine
- Sigma Phi Epsilon
- National Geographic Channel

== Ambassadors ==
- Ashley Judd
- Seane Corn
- Anna Kournikova
- Debra Messing
- Josh Lucas
- Salma Hayek
- Juanes
- Wynonna
- Frederique van der Wal
- Emmy Rossum
- Coco Lee
- Ludacris

== Notable supporters ==
- Penélope Cruz
- Adam Gregory
- Adrien Brody
- Alicia Keys
- Amanda Bynes
- Dennis Quaid
- Claw Money
- Ted Lerner
- Ziggy Marley
- Avril Lavigne
- Benji Madden
- Jamie-Lynn Sigler
- Bono
- Samuel L. Jackson
- Blair Underwood
- Charlize Theron
- Christina Aguilera
- Good Charlotte
- Tina Fey
- Ted Leonsis
- Jason Campbell
- Cindy Crawford
- Justin Timberlake
- Pink
- Joel Madden
- John Mayer
- Kimberley Locke
- John Oliver
- Kristen Bell
- Christy Turlington
- Elijah Wood
- LL Cool J
- Kristin Chenoweth
- Mandy Moore
- Molly Sims
- Elisha Cuthbert
- Dayana Mendoza
- Regina King
- David Yurman

== Documentary ==
Four award–winning documentaries aired on December 1, 2006, on TLC, VH1, The Discovery Channel, and the National Geographic Channel aimed at raising awareness about the global HIV/AIDS crisis, while they follow YouthAIDS Global Ambassador Ashley Judd through the most afflicted areas of Africa, Central America and India.

Ashley Judd and YouthAIDS: Confronting the Pandemic airs on World AIDS Day and chronicles Judd's journey (along with fellow YouthAIDS ambassador, actress Salma Hayek) through communities in Guatemala, Honduras and Nicaragua that have been devastated by HIV/AIDS. Judd told reporters that during the shooting of the documentary both she and Hayek were able to come face to face with the disease in hospices, clinics, brothels, and slums. Additional films include India's Hidden Plague on the National Geographic Channel and Tracking the Monster – Ashley Judd and India.Arie Confront AIDS in Africa, presented by VH1 News.

== Honors and awards ==
- Golden Halo Award – Best Print Creative for "Hear No Evil, See No Evil, Speak No Evil" (ALDO Group and YouthAIDS)
