= Adam & Eve (company) =

American marketer of sex toys and other adult products

- Company type: Private
- Industry: E Commerce
- Founded: 1970; 56 years ago Chapel Hill, North Carolina, U.S.
- Founders: Phil Harvey; Tim Black
- Headquarters: Hillsborough, North Carolina, U.S.
- Products: Sex toys, personal lubricants, condoms, Lingerie, vibrators
- Parent: PHE, Inc.
- Website: www.adameve.com

Adam & Eve is an American independent company that sells adult products through e-commerce. In 2004, it was the largest mail order distributor of sex toys, condoms, and erotica in the United States. Its parent company, PHE Inc., is the largest private employer in Hillsborough, North Carolina, where its headquarters are located. The company funds non-profit social marketing organizations that address issues such as population growth, disease control, and sex education in developing countries.

== Origins ==
The firm was founded in 1970 by British physician Tim Black and American entrepreneur, philanthropist and libertarian Phil Harvey. It started as a small storefront in Chapel Hill, North Carolina, selling condoms and lubricants. It soon became a mail-order catalog selling contraceptives through non-medical channels.

While still graduate students in family planning and population dynamics at the University of North Carolina's School of Public Health, they conceived the firm to fund a non-profit organization to use the profits to finance family-planning programs in developing countries.

With a Ford Foundation fellowship, they devised a plan to use social marketing in the U.S., and with university consent, they began writing witty ad copy ("What will you get her this Christmas -- pregnant?") and advertising condoms in the mail and 300 of the largest U.S. college newspapers. Though selling condoms via the mail violated the Comstock Act (not overturned in its entirety until 1972), they knew the law was rarely enforced. They began to see a profit, stating, "The mail-order condom market was just sitting there waiting for somebody," recalls Harvey. "

== Philanthropy ==
=== Population Services International ===
With the business generating enough revenue to cover costs, the partners wondered if the condom business could create enough profit to finance overseas social-marketing projects. If so, they would have the ability to bypass conventional donors and function with complete autonomy. With that, the men launched Population Services International (PSI), and by 1975, were conducting condom marketing programs in Bangladesh and Kenya. Though Harvey left his position as the director in the late 1970s, PSI still sells birth control and health products in over 60 countries and is prominent in international family planning.

=== DKT International ===
In the late 1970s, Harvey focused more on running Adam & Eve, but in 1989, he also launched DKT International (DKT), an organization that promotes family planning and HIV/AIDS prevention in Africa, Asia, and Latin America. Much of its revenue comes from its sales of low-cost contraceptives, but Adam & Eve also donates more than 25% of its profits. While its biggest programs draw funding from government agencies and foundations, its private funding allows it to greater freedom. Its social marketing strategies have included advertising, creating location-specific brands, working with local social networks and militaries, and targeting high-risk groups.

== Company overview ==
Along with Adam & Eve's brand of erotic toys, the firm carries a variety of items for men, women, and couples. In 2004, it started franchising its stores in the U.S. and abroad. In 2009, the company donated funds to the Free Speech Coalition. In 2019, it acquired the Excite Group, Australia's largest online adult retailer.
