= Melissa Upreti =

Nepalese lawyer and human rights expert

Melissa Upreti (born 1969) is a Nepalese lawyer and human rights expert who was the founding attorney and regional director of the Center for Reproductive Rights' Asia program. She is the Senior Director of Program and Global Advocacy at the Center for Women's Global Leadership at Rutgers University and a member of the United Nations Working Group on Discrimination against Women and Girls.

Upreti is a Nepalese citizen born in the United Kingdom. She has a law degree from Nepal and an LL.M. from Columbia Law School. She is a fellow of the University of Toronto Law Faculty's International Reproductive and Sexual Health Law Program. She was a co-petitioner in the case Lakshmi Dhikta v Nepal, which recognised access to abortion as a constitutionally protected right in Nepal.

Upreti has written extensively on reproductive rights.

== Selected publications ==
- Upreti, Melissa; Katzive, Laura (2002). Abortion in Nepal: Women Imprisoned. Forum for Women, Law and Development. ISBN 9781890671273.
- Upreti, Melissa (2004). Women of the World: Laws and Policies Affecting Their Reproductive Lives, South Asia. Center for Reproductive Rights. ISBN 9781890671105.
- Bogecho, Dina; Upreti, Melissa (2006). "The Global Gag Rule: An Antithesis to the Rights-Based Approach to Health". Health and Human Rights. 9 (1): 17–32. doi:10.2307/4065387. JSTOR 4065387. PMID 17061767.
- Upreti, M. (2014). "Abortion law reform in Nepal". International Journal of Gynecology & Obstetrics. 126 (2): 193–197. doi:10.1016/j.ijgo.2014.05.001. PMID 24890742. S2CID 9280168.
- Upreti, Melissa (2014). "Toward Transformative Equality in Nepal:The Lakshmi Dhikta Decision". In Rebecca J. Cook; Joanna N. Erdman; Bernard M.Dickens (eds.). Abortion Law in Transnational Perspective: Cases and Controversies. University of Pennsylvania Press. pp. 279–302. ISBN 9780812209990.
- Upreti, Melissa (2014). "Reproductive Rights in Nepal:From Criminalization to Resistance". In Julia Sudbury (ed.). Global Lockdown: Race, Gender, and the Prison-Industrial Complex. Routledge. pp. 271–284. ISBN 9781317793670.
- Upreti, Melissa (27 July 2015). "Miscarriage of justice". The Kathmandu Post.
- Upreti, Melissa (17 August 2016). "India Holding Women Hostage to Unwanted Pregnancies". News Deeply.
- Upreti, Melissa; Jacob, Jihan (2018). "The Philippines' new postabortion care policy". International Journal of Gynecology and Obstetrics. 141 (2): 268–275. doi:10.1002/ijgo.12452. PMID 29377114.
