= Child and Family Wellness =

Child and Family Wellness Shops (CFWshops)
- Type: Micropharmacy and clinic franchise
- Industry: Healthcare
- Founded: 1997; 29 years ago
- Founder: Scott Hillstrom; Michael Seid
- Headquarters: Nairobi, Kenya & Minneapolis, US
- Area served: Africa
- Key people: Eric McCarthey (CEO of The HealthStore Foundation); Dr Walter Obita (CEO of Healthstore East Africa)
- Website: https://healthstore.org/about/

Child and Family Wellness shops (CFW Shops ) is a social entrepreneurship project to deliver franchise pharmacy chains to developing countries. The franchise is run by locally trained health care entrepreneurs. The franchisee is self-motivated to run the business with a goal to serve the poor. Current franchise locations are concentrated in Kenya, but goals are to set up franchises all over Africa. Entrepreneurs are required to pay a $300 franchise fee to open their first franchise. The central office offers business training, marketing, medicine transportation and micro loans to get the shops outfitted with medicine. Over a million patients have been served with the CFW shops franchise, however, this million is only a fraction of patients requiring medication in developing countries. CFW shops was created in response to a publication that 25000 children die each day in the world due to lack of access to medication. CFW distribution system of franchising established strict rules of consistency and quality in an effort to boycott the counterfeit medication market. Most of the stores have a trained nurse on staff. CFW shops do not distribute antiretroviral drugs. CFW shops focus on widespread but cheaper options to treat diseases like malaria. Some of the CFW nurses make house calls and assist patients in their social life. The CFW franchisee is for profit while the franchisor a not-for-profit organization funded by charitable donations. In an effort to popularize the CFW brand, the CFW shops also conduct free medical screening and demonstrate water purification techniques for the community. Since the CFW is part NGO, part commercial franchise, charitable donations will go to a separate account that will pay directly for treatment at the stores. CFW is a typical example of using franchising as a social tool.
