= Tim Black =

British family planning pioneer

TRL (Tim) Black
- Born: 7 January 1937; Sussex, England
- Died: 11 December 2014 (aged 77); Sussex, England
- Known for: Family planning
- Awards: CBE
- Scientific career
- Fields: Medicine, public health, reproductive health
- Workplaces: Marie Stopes International

Timothy Reuben Ladbroke "Tim" Black CBE (7 January 1937 – 11 December 2014) was a British family planning pioneer. He was a founding director of Population Services International (PSI) in Chapel Hill, North Carolina, and later the founder of Marie Stopes International (MSI) in London.

Black was Director of PSI's London-based subsidiary Population Services Family Planning Programme Ltd from 1974 until 1991, when the company was subsumed into Marie Stopes International Ltd. He directed PSI's takeover of the bankrupt Marie Stopes Foundation in 1976, then was chief executive of Marie Stopes International from 1976 until 2006, remaining a director of MSI until his death in 2014.

Black was appointed a CBE in the 1994 Queen's Birthday Honours for "services to Family Planning in Developing Countries."

== Early work and education ==
Tim Black grew up in a village in Sussex, England, where he met his future wife Jean. The pair were married in 1962, after he qualified in medicine, and started their adventures together by travelling to South Africa and then up to Salisbury in Southern Rhodesia (now Harare in Zimbabwe), where Black spent a year as a house doctor. After Black's year in Rhodesia he and Jean took off three months and drove in a DKW jeep up through Africa, across to Tunis, Europe and back home to Sussex.

On his return to England, Black worked as a senior house officer and registrar while studying for membership of the Royal College of Physicians at Croydon General and Harefield Hospitals. Jean, meanwhile, worked as a medical secretary at Queen Mary's Hospital in Carshalton.

In 1966, looking for more excitement, the couple drove to India through Europe, the Middle East, Afghanistan and Pakistan. Jean, by this time, was expecting their first child. Jane was born in Queensland, Australia in October 1966, after which the Black family went to New Guinea (now Papua New Guinea) where Tim was medical superintendent of a 120-bed hospital and 10,000 square miles (26,000 km^{2}) of bush.

Returning to England, Black gained a Diploma in Tropical Medicine and Hygiene at the Liverpool School of Tropical Medicine. In 1969 he obtained Population Council and Ford Foundation Fellowships to take a master's degree in Population dynamics at the University of North Carolina. By then the couple's second daughter, Julia, had been born.

== Later work and experience ==
During Black's time in Carolina, he and Jean met Phil Harvey, an American also studying Population Dynamics, and they put together plans to sell condoms through the post. After completing their degrees in 1970, the two men decided to continue with the organisation. Harvey stayed at the 'head office' in Chapel Hill, while Tim and his family left for Africa to set up the organisation's first US-funded Contraceptive Social Marketing (CSM) Programme in Kenya.

When Black returned to the UK in 1974, he and Jean set up a European branch of PSI - Population Services Family Planning Programme Ltd - which became known as Population Services, and eventually Marie Stopes International. The following year the Marie Stopes Memorial Foundation went into liquidation and Black and Harvey put up money to buy the lease of the famous clinic at 108 Whitfield Street, London W1, where Marie Stopes had opened her Mothers Clinic in 1925.

By 1977, a number of vasectomy centres had been established throughout Britain and the operation was generating surplus income. This enabled Population Services to launch its first overseas programme with the opening of the Well Woman Centre in Dublin, Ireland. In 1978 a non-profit society, known as Parivar Seva Sanstha was opened in India under the management of Peter Lawton. These were soon followed by programmes in Sri Lanka and Kenya. Henrietta Search, who joined MSI in 1985, remembers how Tim and a small team strove to achieve more than their limited resources could really sustain.

Despite being a doctor himself, Black was sometimes critical of the involvement of the medical profession in family planning, says Atula Nanayakkara, former Chief Executive of Population Services Lanka:

Tim Black stepped down as Marie Stopes International's Chief Executive in 2006 and stayed on as a member of the Marie Stopes International Board of Directors. Dana Hovig was appointed as Black's successor in January 2007.

He died on 11 December 2014.
