= USAID v. Alliance for Open Society International (2013) =

Agency for International Development v. Alliance for Open Society International, Inc.
- Supreme Court of the United States

Argued April 22, 2013 Decided June 20, 2013
- Full case name: Agency for International Development et al. v. Alliance for Open Society International, Inc., et al.
- Docket no.: 12-10
- Citations: 570 U.S. 205 (more) 133 S. Ct. 2321; 186 L. Ed. 2d 398; 2013 U.S. LEXIS 4699; 81 U.S.L.W. 4476

Case history
- Prior: On writ on certiorari to the United States Court of Appeals for the Second Circuit; Alliance for Open Soc'y Int'l, Inc. v. U.S. Agency for Int'l Dev., 651 F.3d 218 (2d Cir. 2011) .

Holding
- The Policy Requirement violates the First Amendment by compelling as a condition of federal funding the affirmation of a belief that by its nature cannot be confined within the scope of the Government program.

Court membership
- Chief Justice John Roberts Associate Justices Antonin Scalia · Anthony Kennedy; Clarence Thomas · Ruth Bader Ginsburg; Stephen Breyer · Samuel Alito; Sonia Sotomayor · Elena Kagan

Case opinions
- Majority: Roberts, joined by Kennedy, Ginsburg, Breyer, Alito, Sotomayor
- Dissent: Scalia, joined by Thomas
- Kagan took no part in the consideration or decision of the case.

Laws applied
- U.S. Const. Amends. I; U. S. Leadership Against HIV/AIDS, Tuberculosis, and Malaria Act (2003)

Agency for International Development v. Alliance for Open Society International, Inc., 570 U.S. 205 (2013), also known as AOSI I (to distinguish it from the 2020 case), was a United States Supreme Court decision in which the court ruled that conditions imposed on recipients of certain federal grants amounted to a restriction of freedom of speech and violated the First Amendment.

== Facts ==
In 2003, the United States Congress passed and President George W. Bush signed a law providing federal government funds to private groups to help fight AIDS and other diseases all over the world, through the United States Agency for International Development (USAID). However, one of the conditions imposed by the law on grant recipients was a requirement, known as the anti-prostitution pledge, to have "a policy explicitly opposing prostitution and sex trafficking". Many AIDS agencies preferred to remain neutral on prostitution so as not to alienate the sex workers they work with to reduce HIV rates.

DKT International filed a lawsuit in Washington, DC but the challenge to the law was defeated on appeal. Alliance for Open Society International and Pathfinder International filed another suit in 2005. In 2008, InterAction, and the Global Health Council joined the suit against the provision in a federal court in New York City, arguing that the requirement to promote a specific message violated the First Amendment's protection of free speech. The district court judge ruled in their favor, and the provision has effectively been blocked since. On appeal, the Second Circuit Court upheld the judge's decision.

== Decision ==
In November 2012, the Supreme Court granted a petition for certiorari filed by USAID, the U.S. Department of Health and Human Services, and the Centers for Disease Control. In a 6–2 decision, the court ruled in a majority written by Chief Justice John Roberts that the government cannot force a private organization to publicly profess a viewpoint that mirrors the government's view but is not held by the organization itself. Such a requirement would be considered a form of "leveraging" and violated the First Amendment protection of free speech. Justices Antonin Scalia and Clarence Thomas jointly filed a dissenting opinion arguing that the majority's ruling would prevent government funding for specific ideological programs.

== Later case ==
While the U.S. government subsequently did not hold American NGOs to the Policy Requirement for funding, it continues to require foreign affiliates of these NGOs to the requirement. A new set of lawsuits on this action began, and while the case upheld the Supreme Court ruling, the Supreme Court ruled in a 5–3 decision in AOSI II in 2020 that the foreign affiliates were considered separate non-American entities of the American NGOs, and thus did not enjoy the First Amendment freedom of speech protections rights in this case.

== See also ==
- List of United States Supreme Court cases involving the First Amendment
- List of United States Supreme Court cases, volume 570
- 2012 term United States Supreme Court opinions of John Roberts
