= USAID v. Alliance for Open Society International (2020) =

Agency for International Development v. Alliance for Open Society International, Inc.
- Supreme Court of the United States

Argued May 5, 2020 Decided June 29, 2020
- Full case name: Agency for International Development, et al. v. Alliance for Open Society International, Inc., et al.
- Docket no.: 19-177
- Citations: 591 U.S. ___ (more) 140 S. Ct. 2082

Case history
- Prior: Permanent injunction granted, Alliance for Open Soc'y Int'l, Inc. v. U.S. Agency for Int'l Dev., 106 F. Supp. 3d 355 (S.D.N.Y. 2015); Affirmed, 911 F.3d 104 (2d Cir. 2018); Cert. granted, 140 S.Ct. 660 (2019).

Holding
- Because plaintiffs’ foreign affiliates possess no First Amendment rights, applying the Policy Requirement to them is not unconstitutional.

Court membership
- Chief Justice John Roberts Associate Justices Clarence Thomas · Ruth Bader Ginsburg; Stephen Breyer · Samuel Alito; Sonia Sotomayor · Elena Kagan; Neil Gorsuch · Brett Kavanaugh

Case opinions
- Majority: Kavanaugh, joined by Roberts, Thomas, Alito, Gorsuch
- Concurrence: Thomas
- Dissent: Breyer, joined by Ginsburg, Sotomayor
- Kagan took no part in the consideration or decision of the case.

Laws applied
- U.S. Const. amend. I

Agency for International Development v. Alliance for Open Society International, Inc., 591 U.S. ___ (2020), also known as AOSI II (to distinguish it from the 2013 case), was a United States Supreme Court case in which the Court held that compelled speech required as a condition for funding on foreign non-governmental affiliates of U.S. non-government organizations does not violate First Amendment rights.

== Background ==
The United States Leadership Against HIV/AIDS, Tuberculosis, and Malaria Act of 2003 was signed into law as a means to fund private non-governmental organizations (NGO) to help fight AIDS and other diseases in foreign countries. As a condition of this funding, entities were required to also promote an anti-prostitution pledge requiring them to establish "a policy explicitly opposing prostitution and sex trafficking", a term known as the Policy Requirement. This program is overseen through the United States Agency for International Development, the United States Department of Health and Human Services and the Centers for Disease Control and Prevention.

This Policy Requirement was originally challenged by an NGO looking to receive the funding as early as 2005 as it was seen as compelled speech, which violated their First Amendment rights and resulted in the 2013 Supreme Court case AOSI I, which ruled that the anti-prostitution pledge was compelled speech on American NGOs to mirror the government's view.

Following the 2013 decision, the government subsequently backed off the Policy Requirement for those NGOs based in the United States, but maintained the requirement for affiliates that were established in a foreign country. Several of the same NGOs on the 2013 case again filed suit on the First Amendment grounds and following the Supreme Court's decision. In both the United States District Court for the Southern District of New York and United States Court of Appeals for the Second Circuit, the courts upheld in favor of the NGOs on the basis of the Supreme Court's prior ruling.

== Supreme Court ==
The responsible government organizations petitioned the Supreme Court, which accepted to hear the case in August 2019. Oral arguments were heard on May 5, 2020, part of the first set of arguments to be held by teleconference due to the COVID-19 pandemic. Justice Elena Kagan, who took no part in the 2013 decision, also did not participate here.

The Court issued its opinion on June 29, 2020. The 5–3 majority decision reversed the Second Circuit. Justice Brett Kavanaugh wrote the major opinion joined by Chief Justice John Roberts and Justices Clarence Thomas, Samuel Alito and Neil Gorsuch. Kavanaugh wrote that two factors affect the Court's judgment. First, the foreign affiliates are legally separate entities from the American NGOs, and secondly, "because foreign organizations operating abroad do not possess constitutional rights, those foreign organizations do not have a First Amendment right to disregard the policy requirement."

In a concurring opinion, Justice Thomas expressed his "continued disagreement" of the 2013 Court decision, stating the federal government's rule "does not violate the First Amendment for a far simpler reason: It does not compel anyone to say anything."

Justice Stephen Breyer wrote the dissent joined by Justices Ruth Bader Ginsburg and Sonia Sotomayor. Breyer wrote that the foreign NGOs were clearly extensions of the American NGOs, and that the American NGOs "speak[s] through clearly identified affiliates that have been incorporated overseas" as his reason to apply the same 2013 decision to those foreign NGOs.
