= Mexico City policy =

U.S. policy blocking NGO funding

- Cover of the policy
- Date: January 20, 1985; 41 years ago
- Type: Foreign aid policy of the United States
- Participants: De facto implemented by Republican Administrations of the United States
- Footage: https://www.un.org/en/conferences/population/mexico1984

The Mexico City policy, sometimes referred to by its critics as the global gag rule, is a United States government policy blocking U.S. federal funding for non-governmental organizations (NGOs) providing abortion counseling or referrals, advocating to decriminalize abortion, or expanding abortion services. In effect, the Mexico City policy requires foreign non-governmental organizations to certify that they will not "perform or actively promote abortion as a method of family planning" with non-U.S. funds as a condition for receiving U.S. global family planning assistance. During the policy's January 23, 2017 implementation, this requirement was also applied to all other U.S. global health assistance, including U.S. global HIV (under PEPFAR) and maternal and child health (MCH) assistance.

The Mexico City policy was first implemented on January 20, 1985, by the second Reagan administration. Since that time, the United States Agency for International Development (USAID) has enforced the policy during all subsequent Republican administrations and has rescinded the policy at the direction of all Democratic administrations. After its initial implementation by Republican President Ronald Reagan in 1985, the policy was rescinded in 1993 by Democratic President Bill Clinton, reinstated in 2001 by Republican President George W. Bush, rescinded in 2009 by Democratic President Barack Obama, reinstated in 2017 by Republican President Donald Trump, rescinded in 2021 by Democratic President Joe Biden, and reinstated in 2025 by Trump again.

Research shows that by reducing funding for family planning organizations that use abortion as one of many methods of family planning, the Mexico City policy has had the impact of increasing unintended pregnancies and abortions. By reducing access to modern contraception and information about family planning and sexual transmitted disease, the policy has been linked to higher maternal and infant mortality rates, as well as higher incidence rates of HIV.

In 2026, the Trump administration expanded the policy to prohibit what it refers to as the promotion of "gender ideology", forbidding aid recipients from providing gender affirming care, as well as the promotion of promotion of "discriminatory equity ideology", or which refers to diversity, equity and inclusion initiatives; the policy is relevant in about $30 billion of U.S. foreign aid assistance.

== Scope of the policy ==
The policy requires non-governmental organizations to "agree as a condition of their receipt of [U.S.] federal funds" that they would "neither perform nor actively promote abortion as a method of family planning in other nations". The policy has exceptions for abortions performed in response to rape, incest, or life-threatening conditions.

== History of the policy ==
Named for Mexico City, the venue of the United Nations International Conference on Population and Development where it was announced, the policy was instituted by U.S. President Ronald Reagan in 1984. The final language of the 1984 policy was negotiated by the deputy chairman of the U.S. delegation, Alan Keyes, then an Assistant Secretary of State.

After the establishment of the Mexico City policy, organizations were required to meet its specified conditions in order to be eligible for federal funding from the United States, and as a result, several international abortion agencies no longer received a portion of their funds from this source. The International Planned Parenthood Federation (IPPF) did not alter its operation and lost more than 20% of its total funding. Other family planning organizations, such as the Family Guidance Association of Ethiopia and the Planned Parenthood Association of Zambia, likewise did not make the changes required by the Mexico City policy and had their funding cut. NGOs in Romania and Colombia adapted to the new U.S. guidelines and continued to qualify for federal funding.

In 1987 and 1988, the policy was challenged by two U.S. Appeals court rulings in DKT Memorial Fund Ltd. vs. USAID, involving Phil Harvey and two foreign NGOs, and Planned Parenthood Federation of America, Inc. v. USAID. Ultimately, the two court rulings contributed to the policy being used only against foreign NGOs, while not invoked against U.S. NGOs.

Presidential Memorandum Regarding the Mexico City Policy (2017)

President Bill Clinton rescinded the Mexico City policy on January 22, 1993. He referred to the policy as being "excessively broad" and stated that it had "undermined efforts to promote safe and efficacious family planning programs in foreign nations". On January 22, 2001, President George W. Bush reinstated the policy, stating, "It is my conviction that taxpayer funds should not be used to pay for abortions or advocate or actively promote abortion, either here or abroad. It is therefore my belief that the Mexico City Policy should be restored". In September 2007, Barbara Boxer, a Senator from California, created an amendment designed to lift the funding conditions put in place by the Mexico City policy. It passed by a vote of 53–41. President Bush promised to veto any legislation which would eliminate the Mexico City policy. The policy was rescinded again by President Barack Obama on January 23, 2009, and further reinstated on January 23, 2017 by President Donald Trump. Trump not only reinstated the policy but expanded it, making it cover all global health organizations that receive U.S. government funding, rather than only family planning organizations that do, as was previously the case. This includes offices such as USAID, the Department of State, Global Aids Coordinator, Center of Disease Control and Prevention, National Institute of Health, and Department of Defense.

The nature of the policy has implications for organizations in certain countries such as South Africa. Even if these organizations support the policy itself, it is illegal for them not to inform a woman seeking an abortion of her rights, and/or refer her to a facility where she may have an abortion. The President's Emergency Plan for AIDS Relief (PEPFAR) was excluded from the Mexico City policy under the George W. Bush administration, but was not excluded after the Mexico City policy was reinstated on January 23, 2017.

In May 2017, Rex Tillerson announced an expansion of the policy; originally a ban covering roughly $600 million in family planning money, the Trump policy since then applied to all international health care aid doled out by the U.S. government — nearly $9 billion.

The Mexico City policy was rescinded again by President Joe Biden on January 28, 2021. On January 24, 2025, President Donald Trump reinstated the Mexico City Policy.

=== Impact ===
A 2011 study that examined Sub-Saharan Africa found that the Mexico City policy had the unintended consequence of increasing the number of abortions, with the authors suggesting that the reduction in financial support for family planning organizations led to a greater number of accidental pregnancies. A 2015 study of Ghana found that the policy increased unintended pregnancies and abortions. In a 2017 editorial for The New England Journal of Medicine, Stanford University health experts Nathan Lo and Michele Barry said that research showed the policy increases unintended pregnancies and abortions. They wrote that "the reinstatement of the Mexico City Policy is a stark example of 'evidence-free' policymaking that ignores the best scientific data, resulting in a policy that harms global health and, ultimately, the American people." 2017 editorials in The BMJ by University of Michigan Medical School health experts and The Lancet by University of Toronto, Columbia University, and Guttmacher Institute health experts concluded the same.

According to a 2019 study in The Lancet, the implementation of the Mexico City policy during the George W. Bush administration (2001–2009) unintentionally led to more abortions. By limiting funding for family planning organizations, which use abortion as one of many methods of family planning, use of contraceptives reduced and pregnancies increased. When the Mexico City policy was in effect under the Bush administration, the abortion rate was 64% higher in thirteen countries highly affected by the policy than in other comparable countries. Under the immediately preceding Bill Clinton administration when the policy was not in effect, the abortion rate in the thirteen countries was 8% lower than in the other comparable countries. The authors of the study estimate that Bush's imposition of the Mexico City policy increased the abortion rate in the thirteen countries by 40%, and the rest of the increase had other causes. In her 2019 book The Global Gag Rule and Women's Reproductive Health, Rutgers University economist Yana van der Meulen Rodgers commented that Mexico City policy had not reduced abortions, likely increased unsafe abortions, and adversely affected health outcomes for men, women, and children.

== Views ==
The policy originally enacted from 1984 to 1993 spoke to abortion only, not family planning in general. In 2001, the policy was re-implemented and expanded to cover all voluntary family planning activities, and critics began to refer to it as the "global gag rule". These critics argue that the policy not only reduces the overall funding provided to particular NGOs, it closes off their access to USAID-supplied condoms and other forms of contraception. They argue this negatively impacts the ability of these NGOs to distribute birth control, leading to a downturn in contraceptive use and from there to an increase in the rates of unintended pregnancies and abortion. A study of nations in sub-Saharan Africa suggests that unintended pregnancies increased and abortions approximately doubled while the policy was in effect. Critics also argue that the ban promotes restrictions on free speech, as well as restrictions on accurate medical information; it has also been proved that the policy inhibited women worldwide from access to gynecological exams, AIDS prevention and treatment, and contraceptive options, and halted shipment of condoms and contraceptives to more than 20 countries.

The Holy See supports the Mexico City policy, while the European Parliamentary Forum on Population and Development presented a petition to the United States Congress signed by 233 members condemning the policy. The forum has stated that the policy "undermines internationally agreed consensus and goals". Supporters of the policy have argued, using the example of the Philippines, that the ban prevents overseas health organizations from using U.S. government funds to contravene the contraception and abortion laws of the countries in which they operate. Supporters also argue that the policy prevents the health agencies from promoting abortion at the expense of other birth control methods.

== Related policies ==
The Sandbæk Report of the European Union, which calls for the funding of the United Nations Population Fund (UNFPA), was seen by some Catholic commentators as a contrast to the Mexico City policy. The European commissioner Poul Nielson said that the European Union wished to "fill the decency gap" left by the Mexico City policy.

The UNFPA states that it does not "provide support for abortion services". Anti-abortion individuals and organizations have accused the UNFPA of supporting forced abortions by the Chinese government. The Bush administration withheld funding from the agency due to concerns about its alleged involvement. A 2002 U.S. State Department investigation found "no evidence" that UNFPA knowingly took part in forced abortions. The organization has stated that it "has never, and will never, be involved in coercion in China or any part of the world".

In 2010, the Harper government in Canada announced a maternal health development aid plan for the upcoming G8 summit which did not include financial support for abortion or contraception, drawing comparisons to the Mexico City policy.

== In popular culture ==
An episode of the television series Boston Legal, "Squid Pro Quo", which originally aired on May 9, 2006, featured a case involving USAID's withdrawal of funding to an overseas non-profit organization.

An episode of the American television series The West Wing, entitled "Privateers", featured a "gag rule" amendment of a law for overseas aid.

== See also ==
- Abortion in the United States
- Center for Reproductive Law and Policy v. Bush, a court case which upheld the legality of the Mexico City policy
- Gag rule (United States)
- Hyde Amendment
- Anti-prostitution pledge
