= Carafem =

American nonprofit organization

Carafem is an American nonprofit organization that provides women's reproductive health services with centers in Maryland, Atlanta Georgia, Chicago Illinois, and Nashville TN metro areas as well as virtual care in select states. The organization seeks to normalize, "de-medicalize" and remove the social stigma from the provision of birth control and early abortions amidst an ongoing polarized and politicized debate on abortion in the United States. The organization intentionally uses certain language, such as "health center" instead of "clinic", and openly uses the word "abortion" in its advertising.

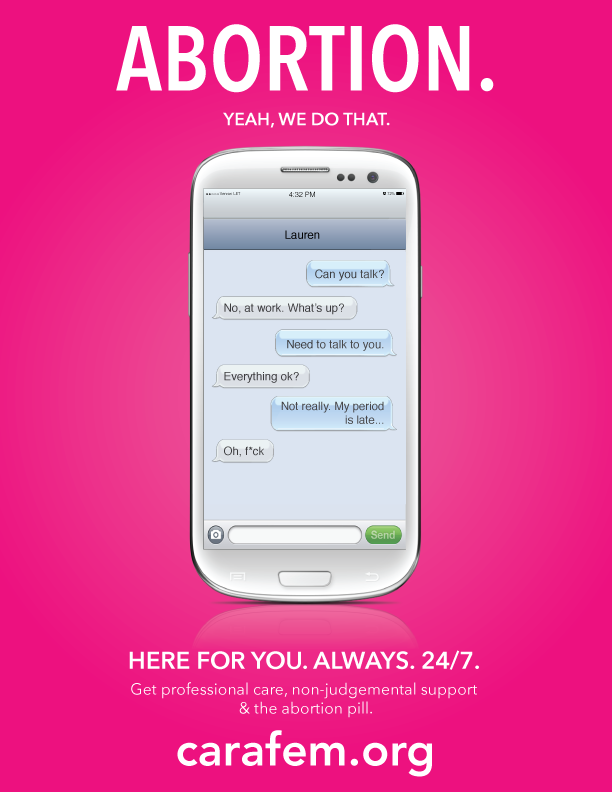
An example of carafem advertising

carafem centers aim to provide information and low-cost options for most methods of birth control including the birth control pill, contraceptive implants, injectable, intrauterine device (IUD), patch, ring and emergency contraception. They also provide early abortion care with medication. carafem operates under the corporate name FemHealth USA, a registered 501(c)(3) organization.

== History ==
Carafem opened its first health center in Chevy Chase, Maryland, just outside Washington, D.C., in April 2015.

From the start, carafem sought to make the abortion experience comfortable and inviting. "With its natural wood floors and plush upholstery, carafem aims to feel more like a spa than a medical clinic," according to The Washington Post. "The advertising reflects its unabashed approach – and a new push to de-stigmatize the nation's most controversial medical procedure by talking about it openly and unapologetically."

An example of that approach is the tagline carafem uses in most of its advertising: "Abortion. Yeah, we do that."

carafem counsels clients on all of their options when facing an unintended pregnancy and provides the abortifacient pill mifepristone for clients electing early abortion with medication. The abortion process begins in the carafem office, where women are provided with the medication and information they need to complete the process at home.

carafem President Christopher Purdy and Vice President Melissa S. Grant have said that carafem was founded because one of every three women in the U.S. will have an abortion in her lifetime, yet it is increasingly difficult for women to obtain these services due to restrictions that are closing clinics and making it more challenging for others to stay open. Grant said that acceptance of mifepristone by American women has been growing, and that since 2000, more than 2 million women have used medication abortion in early pregnancy.

carafem said in 2015 that the planned out-of-pocket cost of the service was $100 less than the national average for the abortion pill.

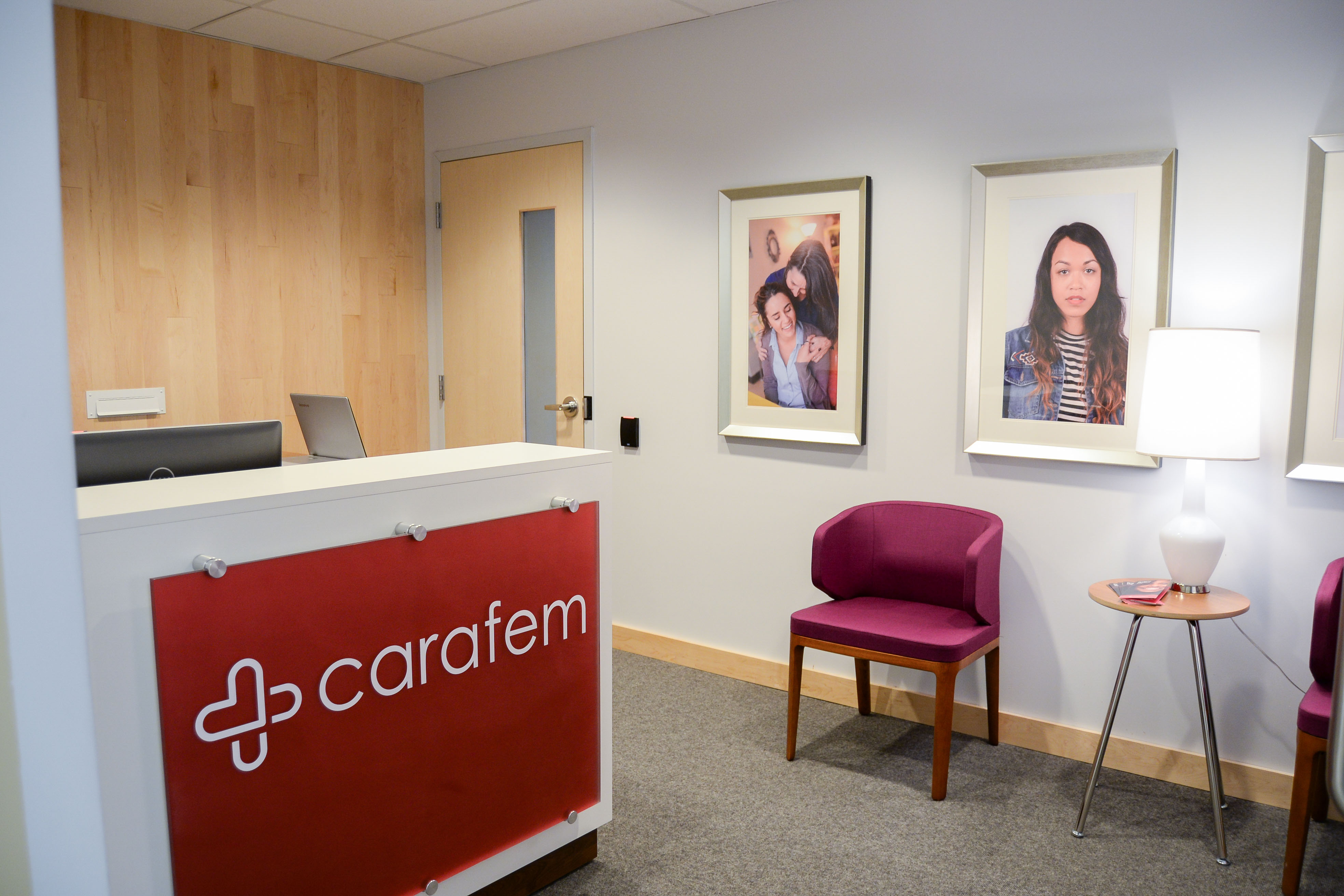
The lobby of the carafem health center in Maryland

In May 2016, carafem opened a second health center in Atlanta. carafem said it opened the Atlanta location because "reproductive health care options in the South have been greatly limited in recent years due to targeted regulations against abortion providers that have resulted in multiple clinic closures."

Seattle-based writer Danielle Campoamor published a first-person account of her visit to the Maryland center at the website Salon in 2016.

In October 2018, carafem opened its third location just outside Chicago in Skokie, Illinois.

In February 2019, carafem opened its fourth location near Nashville, in Mt. Juliet. Within 48 hours of opening, the city council and local legislators created a zoning ordinance to prevent carafem from providing abortion services in Mt. Juliet. After many months in court, the city settled an ACLU lawsuit and carafem was able to provide surgical abortions in Tennessee.

carafem began partnering with Gynuity Health Projects in 2018 on the TelAbortion Study, a research study that aims to evaluate the use of telehealth for people who prefer to receive the abortion pills in the mail rather than during an in-person appointment. Given the safety and overall high patient satisfaction, the study is still ongoing.

At the outset of the COVID-19 pandemic in March 2020, many medical providers saw a significant increase in demand for telemedicine services so carafem launched telehealth services, such as prescribing at-home abortion pills, in Illinois, Maryland, Georgia, Virginia, New Jersey, and the District of Columbia.

== See also ==
- Abortion in the United States
