= MSI Reproductive Choices =

UK non-governmental organization

- Predecessor: Mother's Clinic for Constructive Birth Control; Marie Stopes Foundation (1921–1975)
- Formation: 1976
- Founder: Tim Black, Jean Black and Phil Harvey
- Purpose: To allow women around the world to choose when they have children.
- Headquarters: London
- Services: Contraception and legal abortion
- CEO: Simon Cooke
- Key people: Marie Stopes, Humphrey Verdon Roe
- Staff: 13,000
- Website: www.msichoices.org
- Formerly called: Marie Stopes International (until 2020)

MSI Reproductive Choices, named Marie Stopes International until November 2020, is an international non-governmental organisation providing contraception and safe abortion services in 37 countries around the world. MSI Reproductive Choices as an organisation lobbies in favour of access to abortion, and provides a variety of sexual and reproductive healthcare services including advice, vasectomies, and abortions in the UK and other countries where it is legal to do so. It is based in London and is a registered charity under English law.

In 2015 there were an estimated 21 million women around the world using a method of contraception provided by Marie Stopes International. The organisation claims that in 2015 the services that it averted 6.3 million unintended pregnancies, 4 million unsafe abortions and 18,100 maternal deaths.

The organisation's core services include family planning; safe abortion and post-abortion care; maternal and child health care, including safe delivery and obstetrics; diagnosis and treatment of sexually transmitted infections; and HIV/AIDS prevention.

== History ==
The first family planning clinic ever established in Great Britain, the Mother's Clinic for Constructive Birth Control was established by British author, birth control campaigner and women's rights activist Marie Stopes with her husband Humphrey Verdon Roe in March 1921 and operated virtually uninterrupted until 1975 on the same premises at number 61, Marlborough Road in Holloway, North London.

Operating in later years as the Marie Stopes Foundation, in 1975 the organization found itself bankrupt and entered voluntary administration. It was taken over by Population Services Family Planning Programme Ltd, the European branch of Population Services International (PSI), under the direction of British physician Tim Black, who re-founded the organisation as a social business named Marie Stopes International in 1976.

In 1992, it set up Options Consultancy Services, a wholly owned subsidiary headquartered in the United Kingdom, stating that it is a "provider of technical expertise, short-term consultancy and long-term management services in the health and the social sectors".

In 2000, Marie Stopes opened in Australia, trading under Marie Stopes Australia. It is the only national, independently accredited safe abortion, vasectomy and contraception provider in the country.

In 2008, Marie Stopes International opened in Mexico City state, where legislative change enabled improved access to abortion services.

== Controversy ==
=== Name change ===
In November 2020, Marie Stopes International changed its name to "MSI Reproductive Choices", in reaction to Stopes's views on eugenics, which were in "stark contrast" to its values. The name of the organisation had been under discussion for many years.

=== Care Quality Commission investigation ===
In December 2016, the Care Quality Commission, a British regulatory watchdog, published a report stating 10 clinics operated by MSI Reproductive Choices had failed to adequately train staff and in some cases failed to obtain informed consent from patients.

== Activities ==
=== Contraception ===
MSI estimated that the services they provided in 2019 prevented approximately 13 million unintended pregnancies, 34,600 maternal deaths and 6.5 million unsafe abortions. In 2019 there were 32 million women using a method of contraception provided by MSI.

=== Social marketing ===
MSI runs contraceptive social marketing programmes in 17 countries, such as the Kushi contraceptive pill and injectable in India, Raha condom and Smart Lady emergency contraceptive pill in Kenya, Jodi Condom in Nepal, Lifeguard condom in Uganda and Snake condom in Australia aimed at the Aboriginal population market.

=== Consultancy ===
MSI works with a variety of organizations through its subsidiary, Options Consultancy Services. Their partners include Action for Global Health, Bill & Melinda Gates Foundation, British Expertise, The Children's Investment Fund Foundation, German Corporation for International Cooperation (GIZ), Global Financing Facility, KFW Bankengruppe, Reproductive Health Supplies Coalition, The Global Fund to Fight AIDS, Tuberculosis and Malaria, UK Department for International Development, United States Agency for International Development (USAID), the World Bank, and the World Health Organization (WHO).
