= Phil Harvey =

American businessman and philanthropist (1938–2021)

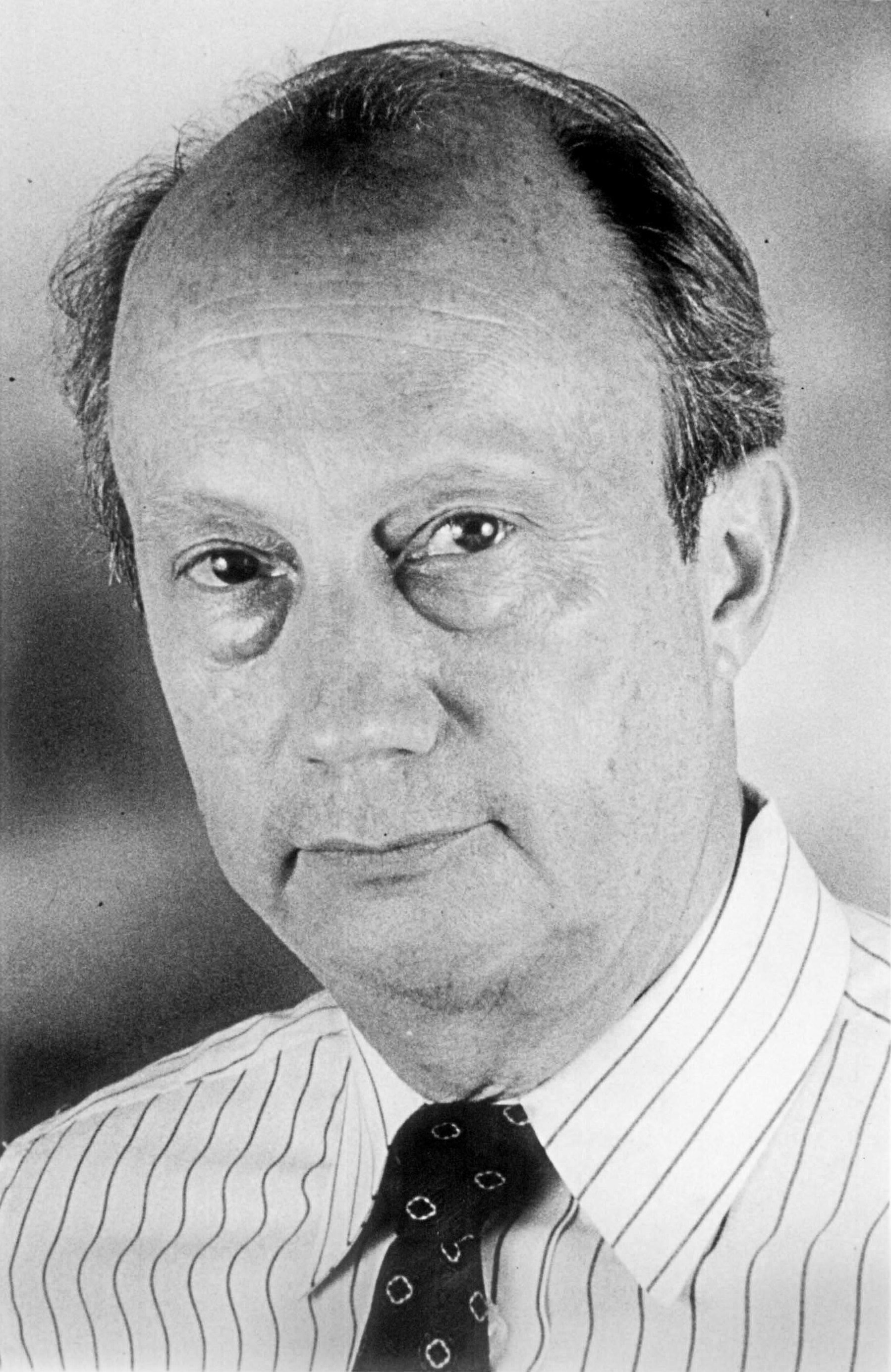
- Born: April 25, 1938; Evanston, Illinois, U.S.
- Died: December 2, 2021 (aged 83); Bethesda, Maryland, U.S.
- Known for: Philanthropy; Sexual Health
- Spouse: Harriet Lesser

Phil Harvey (April 25, 1938 – December 2, 2021) was an American entrepreneur, philanthropist and libertarian who set up large-scale programs that delivered subsidized contraceptives in poor countries. Harvey was the founder and former president of DKT International, a Washington, D.C.–based charity that implements family planning and HIV/AIDS prevention programs in 57 countries across Africa, Asia and Latin America. He was the chief sponsor of the DKT Liberty Project which raised awareness about freedom of speech issues in the U.S. Harvey was also the president of Adam & Eve, the North Carolina–based company that sells sex toys, adult films and condoms. Consequently, he has been called "one of the most influential figures in the American sex industry today".

Harvey used profits from Adam & Eve to supplement support from international donors to protect millions of poor couples from unwanted pregnancies and HIV infections. In 2019, DKT International provided contraceptive protection to 49 million couples.

== Biography ==
Harvey was born in Evanston, Illinois, to William Dow Harvey and Lucy Smith Harvey as the youngest of five siblings on April 25, 1938. He attended Harvard College from 1957 and received his bachelor's degree in 1961 in Slavic languages and literature. Between 1960 and 1962, he served in the army and was based at Ft. Meade, Maryland. He then joined the international charity CARE in 1963 to work in India. His five years' work with CARE on large-scale feeding programs for rapidly growing numbers of Indian children convinced Harvey of the importance of family planning and planted the first seeds in his mind of starting an initiative that could address the issue on a global scale.

He returned to the U.S. in 1969 and enrolled in the University of North Carolina's master's degree program in family planning administration. One of his classmates was the late Dr. Tim Black, a British physician (who went on to found Marie Stopes International, a large British charity also focused on family planning services). Harvey and Black founded Population Services International in 1970 which today works in almost 70 countries with an annual budget of $684 million (2013). Harvey was executive director of PSI from 1970 to 1977 and remained on the PSI Board until 2003.

Harvey co-founded Adam & Eve in 1972 and continued as its president until his death. He also founded DKT International in 1989 and stepped down as its president and chief executive on December 31, 2013.

He was executive producer on the 2015 documentary about censorship in comedy, Can We Take a Joke?, and the 2020 free speech documentary about former ACLU Executive Director Ira Glasser, Mighty Ira.

Harvey died from natural causes in Bethesda, Maryland, on December 2, 2021, at the age of 83.

== Business and non-profit enterprises ==
Harvey's operational philosophy was unique: it combined altruism with strong business models. Adam & Eve was, and continues to be, one of the largest sex product companies in the world. Harvey's share of profits from it supported DKT International which sells low-priced contraceptives by using business channels that are found in every corner of the world, including in low-resource settings. Special projects, such as those with the military in Ethiopia (which obliges all soldiers to carry condoms when they leave the base), or with local medical practitioners in India who make a small profit selling condoms and pills, extend and supplement this approach and ensure the products are widely available.

Harvey realized the potential of mail order when, at the University of North Carolina, he joined forces with Tim Black to begin selling condoms through the mail. Their efforts to expand the range of products led to the evolution of the sex products business. In Harvey's own words, "(w)e tried to get our customers to buy leisure wear, shipbuilding kits, belt buckles, model airplanes, but they just yawned at that stuff. Every time we put something with erotic appeal in the catalog, the bells would ring." Profit from their mail-order business provided the funds to launch Population Services International.

=== Legal Challenges ===
Between 1977 and 2007, Harvey was involved in several legal battles with the U.S. and New York state governments, in which he both challenged and defended himself against governments he believed were debasing First Amendment rights. As executive director of PSI in 1977, Harvey took on New York Governor Hugh Carey in a landmark reproductive health case that went all the way to the U.S. Supreme Court. In Carey vs. Population Services International, the Court found unconstitutional, under the First and Fourteenth Amendments, the New York Education Law that made it a crime (1) for any person to sell or distribute any contraceptives to persons under 16; (2) for anyone other than a licensed pharmacist to distribute contraceptives to anyone; and (3) for anyone, including licensed pharmacists, to advertise or display contraceptives. The 1977 ruling, in combination with subsequent rulings, confirmed that the protection of rights and privacy are not limited to married adults. A syllabus of the 1977 ruling noted that New York State had "conceded that there is no evidence that teenage extramarital sexual activity increases in proportion to the availability of contraceptives."

In 1986, Adam & Eve's offices in Carrboro, North Carolina were raided by 37 armed local law enforcement agents. For the next six years, Harvey defended himself against multiple indictments for obscenity brought by the Reagan Administration's Department of Justice under Attorney General Edwin Meese. Ultimately, he prevailed in the Tenth Circuit Court of Appeals in 1992 after initiating proactive litigation against the U.S. government. Harvey documented this story in his 2001 book "The Government vs. Erotica: The Siege of Adam & Eve." Nadine Strossen, then-president of the American Civil Liberties Union, wrote in the foreword of "The Government vs. Erotica": "Phil Harvey not only survived the government's relentless efforts to bully him out of business, as it had done to other businesspeople who also sold constitutionally protected materials to adults who sought those materials, even more inspiringly, Phil Harvey and his impressive legal team secured new legal precedents and prosecutorial policies that will protect other individuals and businesses from similar government harassment and oppression."

=== Mexico City Policy ===
In 1987, while embroiled in the prosecutions of the Reagan Administration, Harvey challenged the U.S. government for its "Mexico City Policy", an on-again, off-again policy first enacted by President Ronald Reagan in 1984 which requires all non-governmental organizations (NGOs) receiving federal funding to refrain from performing or promoting abortion services as a method of family planning in other countries. In DKT Memorial Fund Ltd. vs. USAID, Harvey and two foreign NGOs fought to have the Mexico City Policy overturned. Ultimately, the DC Circuit U.S. Court of Appeals ruling contributed to the policy being used only against foreign NGOs, while not invoked against U.S. NGOs. The policy was removed by President Bill Clinton in 1993, re-imposed by George W. Bush in 2001, removed again by Barack Obama in 2009, and re-imposed again by Donald Trump in 2017.

=== DKT International ===
Harvey named DKT International, in memory of the late Deep Kumar Tyagi, an early pioneer of family planning in India. In 2006, DKT International refused to accept the U.S. government's policy that all NGOs receiving federal funds to fight AIDS or sex trafficking adopt an organization-wide policy opposing prostitution and sex trafficking. Harvey believed that the pledge was a form of coerced speech and that it would interfere with HIV prevention efforts. DKT challenged the pledge as a violation of First Amendment rights, with the support of the American Civil Liberties Union. Judge Emmet G. Sullivan ruled in favor of DKT in the U.S. District Court for the District of Columbia in 2006, but the District of Columbia Court of Appeals reversed the decision the following year. The issue, through a separate case, was argued before the U.S. Supreme Court on April 22, 2013, and that Court, in a 6-2 decision, held that the requirement was an unconstitutional infringement of organizations' free speech rights. The policy is therefore null and void.

On December 31, 2013, Harvey stepped down as president of DKT after 24 years. He continued to serve DKT as chairman of the Board of Directors during the remaining years of his life.

== Books ==
- Let Every Child Be Wanted: How Social Marketing is Revolutionizing Contraceptive Use Around the World (1999) – This book provides the only comprehensive examination of contraceptive social marketing, documenting a form of international assistance that has attracted support from governments, foundations and other donors.
- The Government vs. Erotica (2001) – Harvey traces the various prosecutions of his company, Adam & Eve, which started as a mail-order supplier of condoms, then branched into the distribution of adult films and sexual paraphernalia.
- Government Creep: What Government Is Doing That You Don't Know About (2003) – Strip searches, confiscated homes, stolen children, denial of due process. Sounds like life in a Third World country, but this is our own federal government invading our personal lives, supposedly for our own good.
- Show Time (2012) – Harvey's first novel is a psychological thriller that takes on reality shows.
- The Human Cost of Welfare: How the System Hurts the People It's Supposed to Help (2016) co-authored with Lisa Conyers – Drawing on research including interviews with men and women on welfare, this book shows how welfare programs keep people from working with crippling consequences not only for them but for our whole country.
- Welfare for the Rich: How Your Tax Dollars End Up in Millionaire's Pockets - And What You Can do About it (2020) co-authored with Lisa Conyers; Foreword by David Boaz - The issues tackled in these pages -agricultural subsidies, financial bailouts, taxes and tariffs, zoning and business regulations, the power of lobbyists, and much more-provide timely analysis for readers with a professional or personal interest in economics, political science, wealth reform, as well as the workings of state, local, and municipal governments.

== Awards ==
- 2006 AASECT – Humanitarian Award
- 2007 AVN Awards – Hall of Fame – Founders Branch
- 2009 XBIZ – Lifetime Achievement Award
- 2010 XRCO – 1st Amendment Special Award
