= Pathfinder International =

Global non-profit organization

- Formation: 1957; 69 years ago
- Type: INGO
- Legal status: Foundation
- Region served: Africa, South Asia, Middle East
- CEO: Tabinda Sarosh
- Board Chair: Collin Mothupi
- Budget: $35 million
- Staff: 457 people worldwide
- Website: www.pathfinder.org

Pathfinder International is a global non-profit organization that focuses on women's health, climate resilience, and leadership. The organization operates in 16 low- and middle-income countries in Africa, South Asia, and the Middle East. Its mission is to "catalyze women-led, locally grounded sustainable solutions that strengthen communities — enabling women to navigate change, shape their own futures, and lead healthy lives."

== History ==
Pathfinder International originally was incorporated as The Pathfinder Fund in 1957. Its family planning work began in the late 1920s when its founder Clarence Gamble, heir of the Procter & Gamble soap company fortune, supported efforts to introduce contraception to women and couples in the United States and 60 other countries. In addition to his eugenicist work, he worked toward easy access to contraception in minority communities. He also launched the first community-based service model, which is still the foundation of Pathfinder's operations.The work Pathfinder International currently does and the organization it has become over the last few decades stand in direct opposition to the racially biased and unscientific beliefs and practices that characterized the eugenics movement and our founding. The Pathfinder of today and of the last many decades is characterized by a rights-based approach to programming that supports women, girls, young people, and families in carrying out their reproductive intentions through voluntary and informed access to contraception and reproductive health services. In 2022, Pathfinder donated its archived documents spanning from approximately 1957 to 1982 to Harvard Medical School as it underwent a public effort to reconcile with its history.

Sarah Gamble, Clarence Gamble's wife, named the organization in honour of a quote by the poet Antonio Machado: "Traveler, there is no path, paths are made by walking."

Pathfinder surpassed revenue of US$100 million for the first time in the 2010 fiscal year. In 2011, Pathfinder announced the retirement of Daniel E. Pellegrom, the longest-serving president of a global reproductive health organization in history after becoming CEO of Pathfinder International in 1985. In 2012, Purnima Mane joined Pathfinder as president and CEO after serving as deputy director of United Nations Population Fund.

Dr. Tabinda Sarosh became Pathfinder's President and CEO in 2025. Lois Quam, named three times to Fortune magazine's list of the most influential women leaders in business, was Pathfinder's president and CEO from 2017 to 2024. She was chief operating officer of The Nature Conservancy and a senior advisor to Hillary Clinton's presidential campaign. She was selected by President Barack Obama to head his signature Global Health Initiative at the Department of State, which provided more than $8 billion annually to help solve major health challenges facing millions of individuals across 80 countries. On May 13, 2024, Dr. Tabinda Sarosh became the interim CEO of Pathfinder International. In 2025, Dr. Sarosh became the new President and CEO. In a previous tie with the organization, she served as President of the Pathfinder's Middle East, North Africa, and South Asian region.

Pathfinder was one of several nonprofits mentioned in the book Half the Sky: Turning Oppression into Opportunity for Women Worldwide by Nicholas Kristof and Sheryl WuDunn, published in September 2009.

== Current initiatives ==
=== Examples ===
Pathfinder International continues to run integrated programs at the nexus of women's health, climate resilience, and leadership. Examples include their Preventing Child Marriage program in Cabo Delgada, Mozambique and Darwin Initiative in Kenya Pathfinder still runs multiple programs that focus exclusively on sexual and reproductive health and rights, such as EMPOWER in Uganda and J-Matassa in Niger.

In 2025, Pathfinder is in its fourth and final year with the project "Advancing the Leadership of Women and Girls Towards Better Health and Climate Resilience". The program focuses on Bangladesh and Pakistan and supports women and girls in areas prone to climate disasters to access to health services, climate-resilience livelihoods, and information on climate change and health. Pathfinder International partnered with the Bangladeshi government to create five short videos, aiming to educate Bangladesh youth on violence, health, hygiene, and climate safety. The program has helped an estimate of 150,000 people as of September 2024.

== Activities ==
Pathfinder International works with many organizations, ranging from national ministries of health to local NGOs, to deliver reproductive health, family planning information, and services to women, young adults, and rural populations. Pathfinder's programs also integrate HIV/AIDS prevention and treatment activities. The group has worked with UN Women, the UNFPA, the World Bank, and several other partners to organize different programs and projects.

Pathfinder's programs in 16 countries across Africa, South Asia, and the Middle East expand access to critical services for women's health, climate resilience, and leadership, such as modern contraception, maternal and child healthcare, sustainable livelihoods, and training and mentorship opportunities.

=== Locations ===
==== Africa ====
- Burkina Faso
- Burundi
- Côte d'Ivoire
- Democratic Republic of Congo
- Egypt
- Ethiopia
- Kenya
- Mozambique
- Niger
- Nigeria
- Tanzania
- Uganda

==== Asia and Pacific ====
- Bangladesh
- India
- Jordan
- Pakistan

== Funding ==
A little over half of the group's $130 million in funding came from the United States Agency for International Development in fiscal year 2019. In addition, the organization receives funding from multilateral organizations, private foundations, and individuals. As part of the President's Emergency Plan for AIDS Relief, U.S. government support for AIDS prevention was contingent on opposing prostitution starting in 2003. Pathfinder preferred to remain neutral so as not to alienate sex workers from its anti-HIV efforts, so it sued in federal court with other non-profit organizations. In 2013, the U.S. Supreme Court found that the requirement violated the First Amendment's prohibition against compelled speech in Agency for International Development v. Alliance for Open Society International, Inc. In early 2015, the U.S. Supreme Court returned with another ruling in favour of the Alliance for Open Society International. The latest decision affirmed a 2013 decision by the U.S. Supreme Court, which found that the government cannot tell its American grantees what they can and cannot say.

== Criticism ==
Like many older birth control organizations, Pathfinder initially overlapped with the eugenics movement. The founder, Clarence Gamble, was a member of the Human Betterment League of North Carolina and advocated the forced sterilization of mental patients.

During the 1970s, the organization was accused of distributing unsafe contraceptives. Specifically, Pathfinder continued to distribute the Dalkon Shield internationally after it had been withdrawn from the U.S. market due to high infection rates and used Depo-Provera when it was considered experimental before FDA approval.

In 2022, Pathfinder started a process of reckoning with its history and has donated its archives to Harvard University, where researchers can freely access them.
