= Population Services International =

US-based nonprofit organization

- Formation: January 1, 1970; 56 years ago
- Founder: Phil Harvey, Tim Black and Jean Black
- Founded at: Chapel Hill, North Carolina, US
- Type: NGO
- Tax ID no.: 56-0942853
- Legal status: 501(c)(3) charitable organization
- Headquarters: Washington, D.C., United States
- Coordinates: 38.9045517°N 77.043873°W
- Chair: J. Brian Atwood, Ph.D.
- President, CEO: Karl Hofmann
- Subsidiaries: Prudence LLC
- Revenue: $584,029,958 (2013)
- Expenses: $579,319,073 (2013)
- Employees: 392 (2013)
- Volunteers: 685 (2013)
- Website: www.psi.org

Population Services International (PSI) is a 501(c)(3) registered nonprofit global health organization that began as an international not-for-profit provider of contraception and safe abortion services, and has evolved into developing and deploying programs today that target malaria, child survival, HIV, and reproductive health. PSI provides products, clinical services and behavior change communications for the health of people in high-need populations.

== History ==
PSI was founded in 1970 in Chapel Hill, North Carolina, by the American entrepreneur, philanthropist and libertarian Phil Harvey, Dr. Tim Black, a British physician with experience in the United Kingdom, Rhodesia (now Zimbabwe) and New Guinea (now, Papua New Guinea), and Black’s wife, Jean.

In 1969, Harvey and Tim Black met while working towards Master's degrees in family planning and population dynamics at the University of North Carolina. While still graduate students, they and Jean Black co-founded a retail and mail-order business called Adam and Eve, selling condoms and sex aids in the United States and internationally in order to use the profits to finance family-planning programs in developing countries. Upon completion of their degrees, they co-founded PSI as a charitable not-for-profit organization, using revenue from Adam and Eve to fund the organization.

Harvey and Tim and Jean Black were the original directors of PSI, with Harvey serving as executive director from 1970 to 1977. Harvey remained on the PSI Board until 2003. While serving as PSI directors, Tim and Jean Black moved to Kenya from 1970 to 1974 to set up a PSI-run Contraceptive Social Marketing pilot program, which with support from USAID and other agencies would later be expanded to other African countries.

In 1971, the PSI Board was expanded through the addition of Dr. Geoffrey Davis, an Australian physician affiliated with the International Abortion Research and Training Centre in London. In the 1960s, Davis operated two clinics in the Sydney suburbs of Potts Point and Arncliffe, where he carried out discreet pregnancy terminations until the 1971 legalization in New South Wales of abortion in cases where pregnancy puts a woman's life or physical or mental health at risk.

In 1974, PSI began experiencing significant international growth, with Davis being named Project Director for PSI Southeast Asia and Oceania, incorporated as Population Services International (Australasia) Ltd, with headquarters in Davis’s Potts Point clinic offices. Davis held that position for a decade, when he became Director of PSI Australia, from 1984 until his retirement in 1988.

Also in 1974, Tim and Jean Black, newly returned from Kenya to London, set up a European branch of PSI called Population Services Family Planning Programme Ltd, which by 1976 had taken over the bankrupt Marie Stopes Foundation, renaming it as Marie Stopes International (now MSI Reproductive Choices). Marie Stopes International/MSI Reproductive Services directors included PSI founder Tim Black until 2014 and Phil Harvey until 2021.

== Programs ==
Today, PSI's world headquarters are in Washington, D.C., and its European offices are in Amsterdam. The organization employs more than 250 U.S. staff, more than 150 overseas expatriate staff and 8,000 local PSI affiliate staff. Major donors include the governments of the United States, United Kingdom, Germany and the Netherlands; the Global Fund, United Nations agencies, private foundations, corporations and individuals.

It is a member of the U.S. Global Leadership Coalition, a Washington, D.C.-based coalition of over 400 major companies and NGOs that advocates for a larger International Affairs Budget, which funds American diplomatic and development efforts abroad.

== Celebrity ambassadors ==
PSI works with celebrity ambassadors to raise awareness about the organization's work. Ambassadors have joined PSI staff on international trips to gain a better understanding of PSI's work, testified before Congress to promote increased funding of global health programs, and taken part in many conferences and forums to enhance PSI's visibility. As of 2017, PSI has three celebrity ambassadors: Ashley Judd, Mandy Moore, and Debra Messing.

== External reviews ==
PSI is one of a select group of charities endorsed by noted philosopher and Princeton Professor Peter Singer as Highly Effective in the fight against extreme poverty.

Charity evaluator GiveWell first reviewed PSI in 2007, again in 2009 and then again in 2011. Initially, GiveWell recommended PSI as one of its top charities. However, in its most recent review, GiveWell states that "The evidence we have seen does not clearly show that PSI has the impact it intends" while at the same time praising PSI for "(a) focusing on programs with proven impact and (b) monitoring whether these programs are implemented effectively".

In 2007 and 2008 PSI was highlighted by Fast Company as a Top Social Capitalist, noting the organization's private sector partnerships with Procter & Gamble and others.
