= Ormond College, Melbourne =

Division of University of Melbourne, Australia

Ormond College
- University of Melbourne
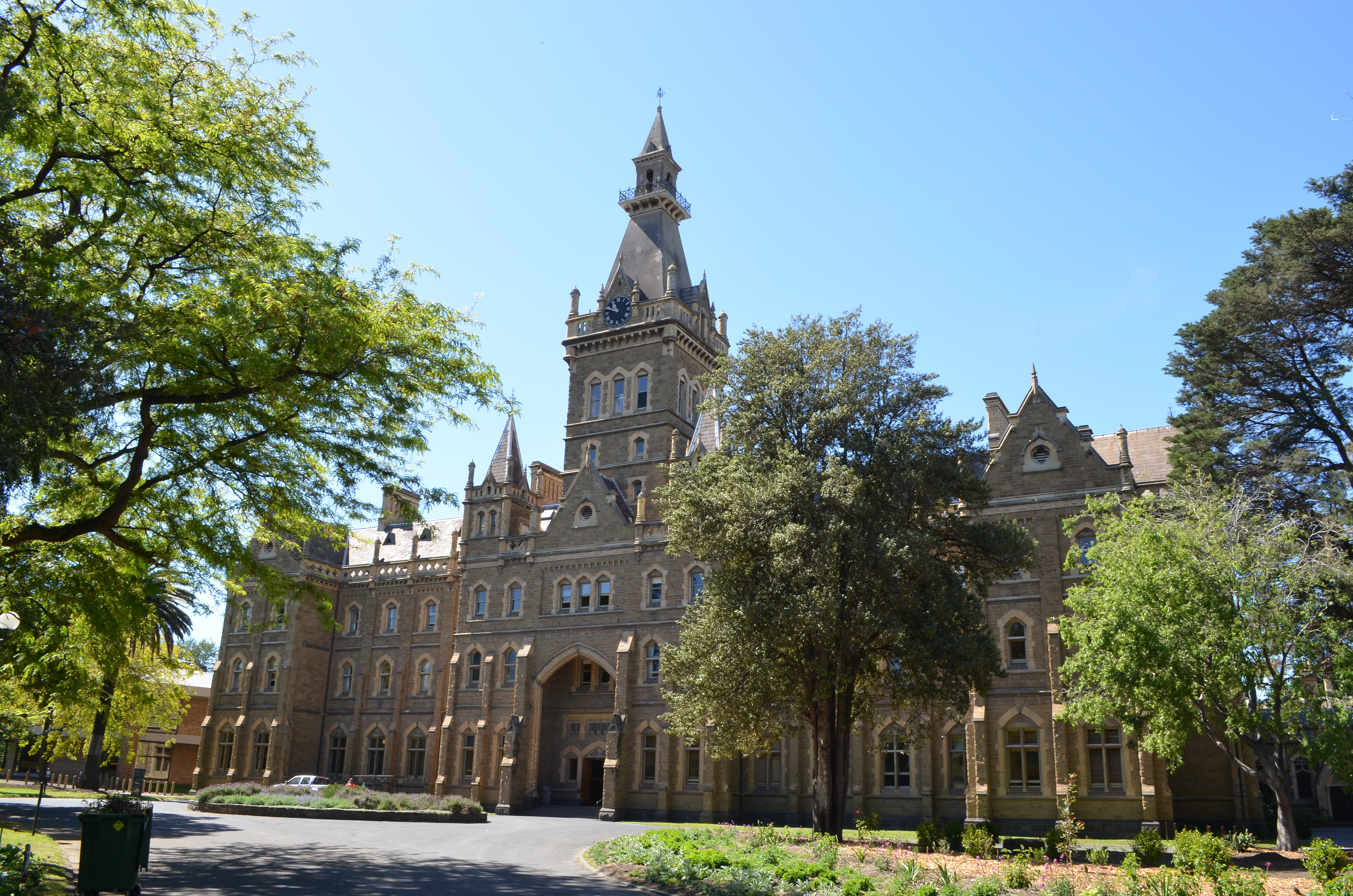
- Ormond College from College Crescent

- Location: 49 College Crescent, Parkville, Victoria
- Coordinates: 37.7935°S 144.9635°E
- Motto: Et Nova et Vetera (Latin)
- Motto in English: Both the New and the Old
- Established: 1879
- Master: Areti Metuamate
- Undergraduates: 360
- Postgraduates: 66
- Website: ormond.unimelb.edu.au

Ormond College is the largest of the residential colleges of the University of Melbourne located in the city of Melbourne, Victoria, Australia. It is home to around 350 undergraduates, 90 graduates and 35 professorial and academic residents.

== History ==
=== Beginnings (1853) ===
The University of Melbourne was established by an act of the Parliament of Victoria in 1853. 24 hectares (60 acres) were set aside for residential colleges, of which 4 hectares (10 acres) each were allotted to the Anglican, Presbyterian, Methodist and Roman Catholic denominations. The Presbyterian allotment became Ormond College.

At the end of August 1877, Alexander Morrison, headmaster of Scotch College and convener of the Presbyterian Church assembly's committee to "watch over the land", received a letter from the director of the Victorian Education Department, proposing that if the church did not mean to take the land for a college, that it be sold and the proceeds divided, half to the church and half to the state for university purposes. This spurred Morrison into action. A subscription list was opened, with a target of £10,000; on this list Francis Ormond's name appears against a donation of £3,000.

The General Assembly meeting in November 1877 resolved that the church should immediately proceed with the building of a college and that £10,000 be raised for the purpose, that the buildings be used as a college of residence for university students and as a theological school. Immediate steps were taken to raise the money. In the course of three years, some £38,000 were raised, of which Francis Ormond contributed £22,571. The foundation stone of the college (now lost) was laid by the governor of Victoria, George Phipps, 2nd Marquess of Normanby, on 15 November 1879. The formal opening of the college took place on 18 March 1881. At this ceremony it was announced that Francis Ormond had offered to bear the whole cost of the remainder of the planned buildings.

On opening there were 20 students, soon growing to 24. Ormond College was unique amongst University of Melbourne colleges in welcoming students of all faiths and none, a philosophy built upon the Scottish Enlightenment tradition. Students of other Christian denominations, Jewish students and others were welcomed and this has become a cornerstone of the college's inclusive ethos.

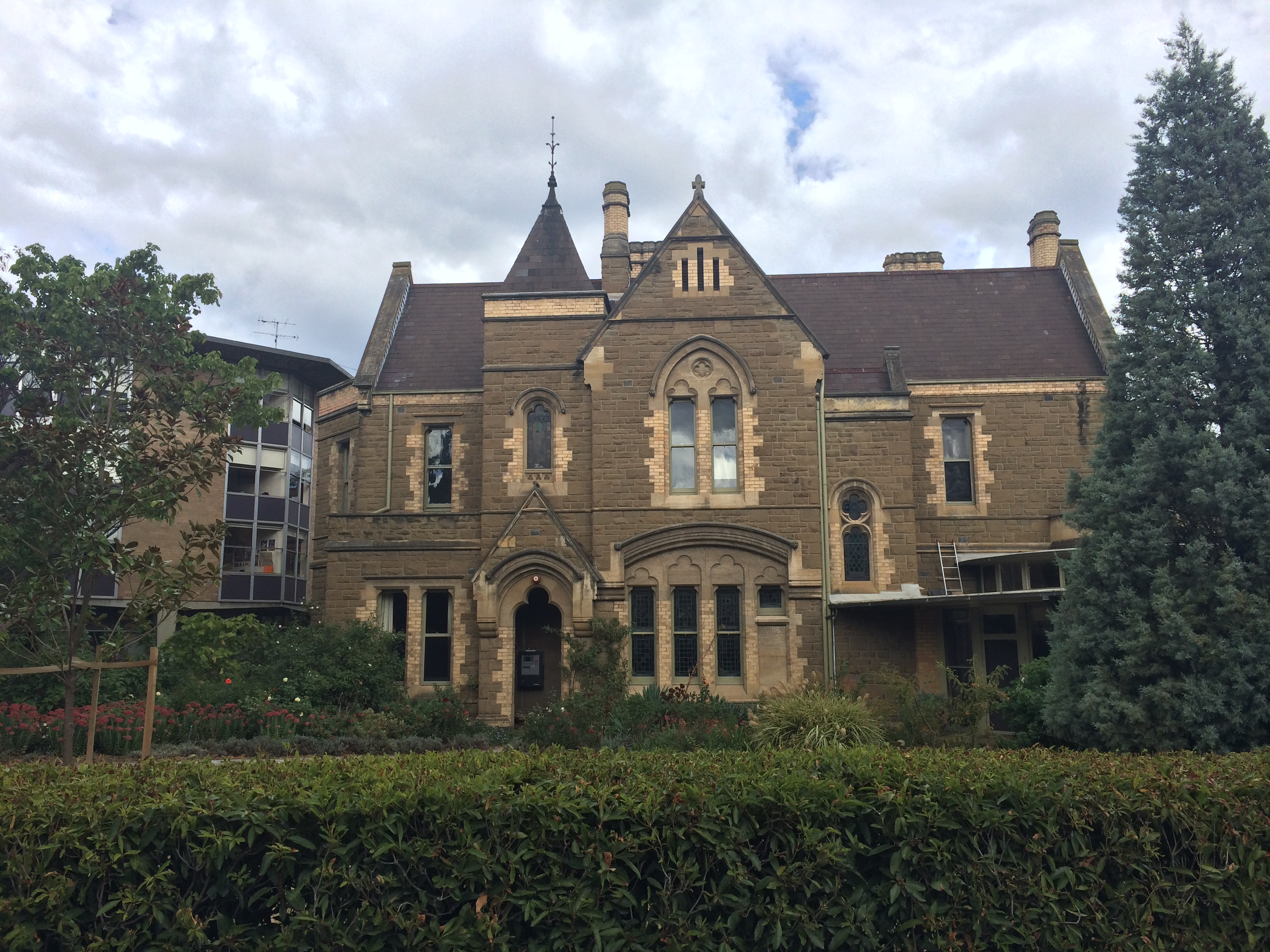
Allen House

In honour of the silver jubilee of Queen Victoria in 1887, Francis Ormond funded the building of the Victoria Wing which came into use in 1889. In 1893 the dining hall, kitchens, staff quarters and the original master's residence (Allen House) were opened. The neo-Gothic dining hall is reminiscent of an Oxbridge building and is often compared to Hogwarts from J. K. Rowling's Harry Potter. A Hogwarts-themed episode of MasterChef was filmed there in 2013.

=== Rapid growth (1880s) ===
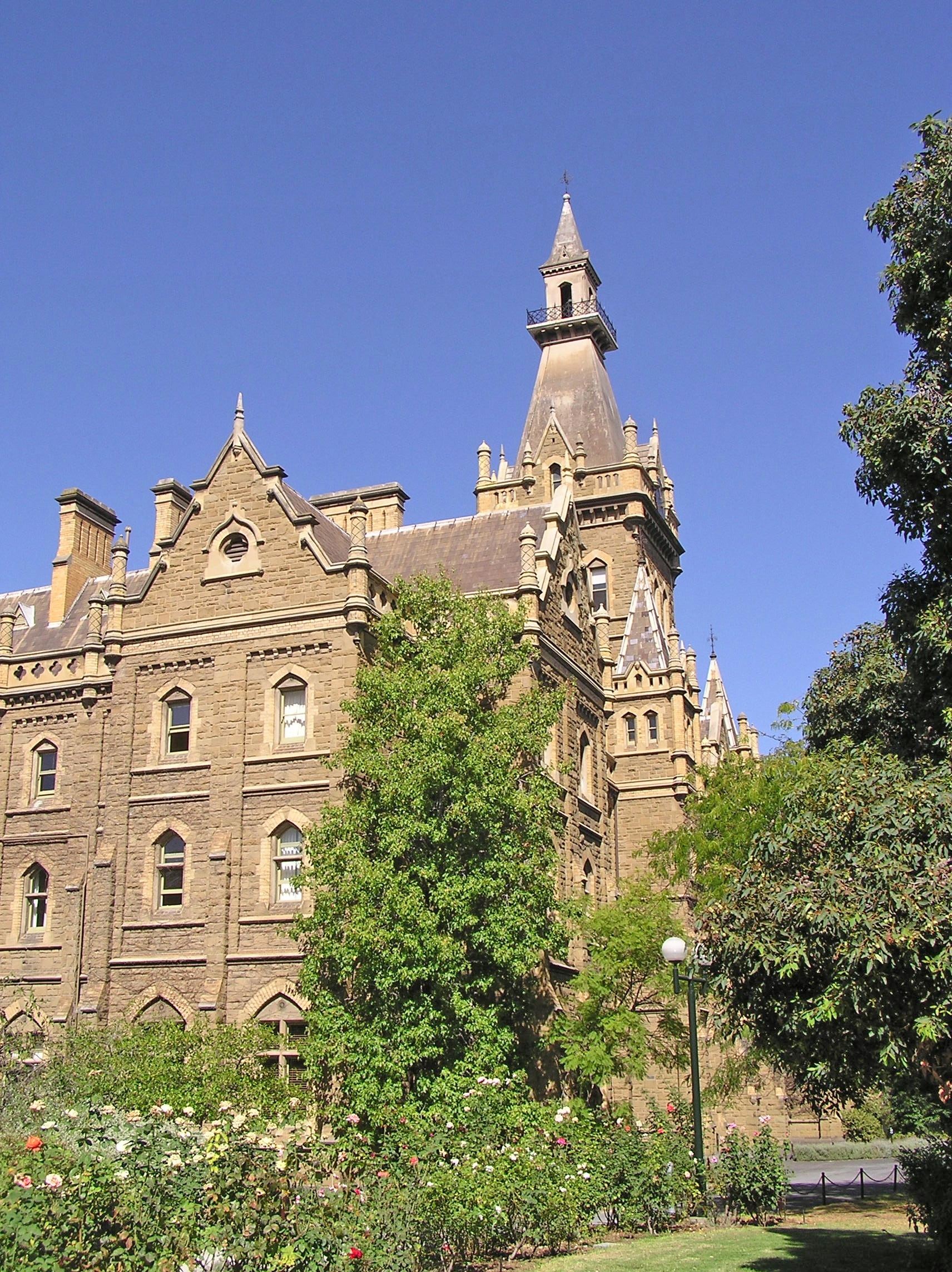
Ormond College (1879) University of Melbourne

The rapid growth of the college soon outstripped the available accommodation and Francis Ormond provided funds for the southwest wing, together with a temporary building (which was, however, stone-walled and tin-roofed) where the cloisters now are, which served as kitchens and a dining hall. The next addition to the buildings of the college was the Wyselaskie building, which was completed in March 1887. John Dickson Wyselaskie was a Western District squatter, who also gave generously to the Presbyterian Ladies' College. The building contained a lecture hall and two residences for theological professors and was adapted and divided in 1968 so as to provide for four residences. On 6 July 1887, the portrait of Francis Ormond, which now hangs above the college's dining hall door, was unveiled by Sir James McBain.

In honour of the silver jubilee of Queen Victoria in 1887, Francis Ormond funded the building of the Victoria Wing which came into use in 1889. In 1893 the dining hall, kitchens, staff quarters and the original lodge (Allen House) were opened. On either side of the end window of the hall are effigies representing Francis and Mary Ormond.

=== Post WWII expansion (1950s) ===
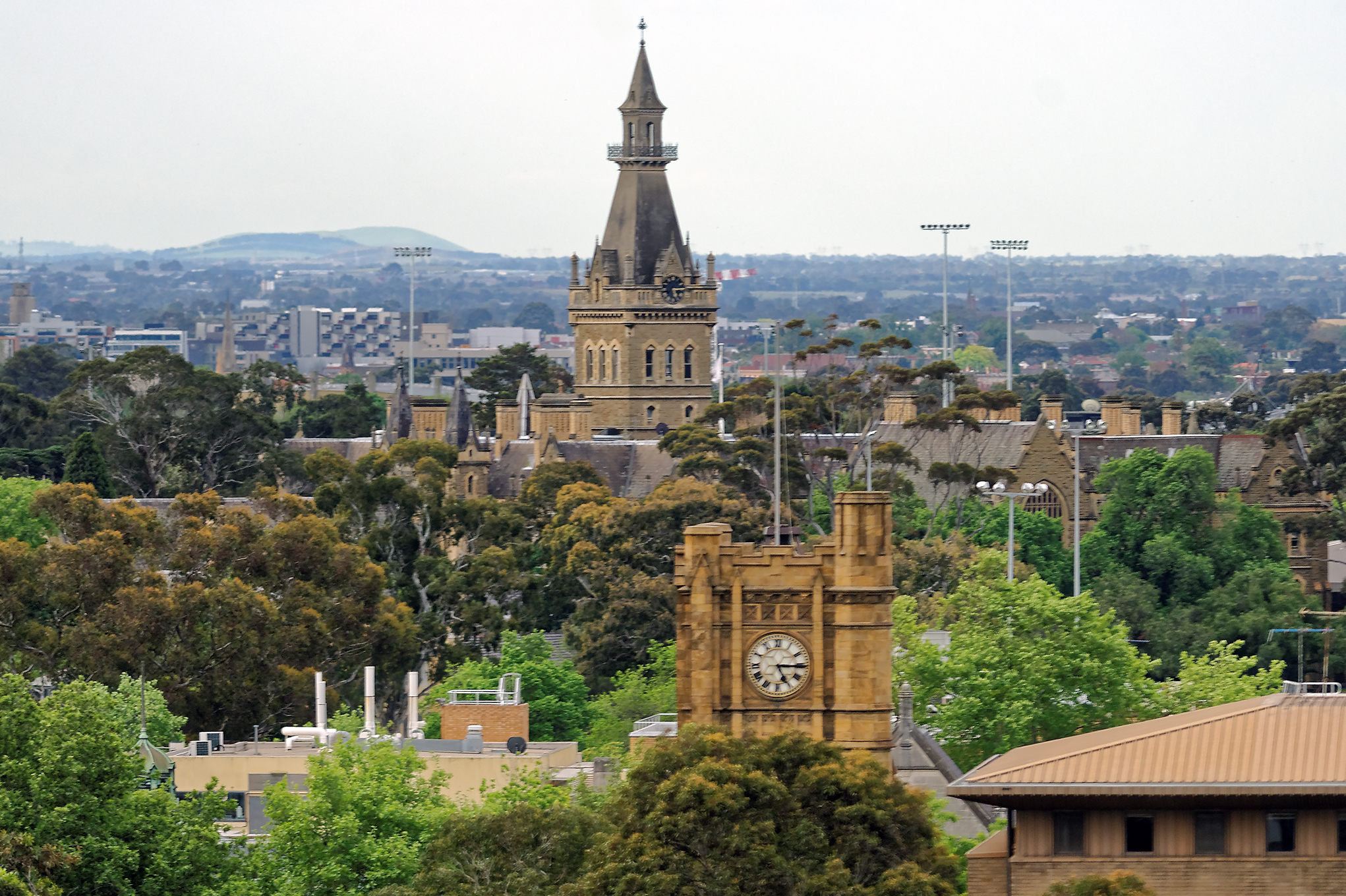
Ormond College from The Law Building

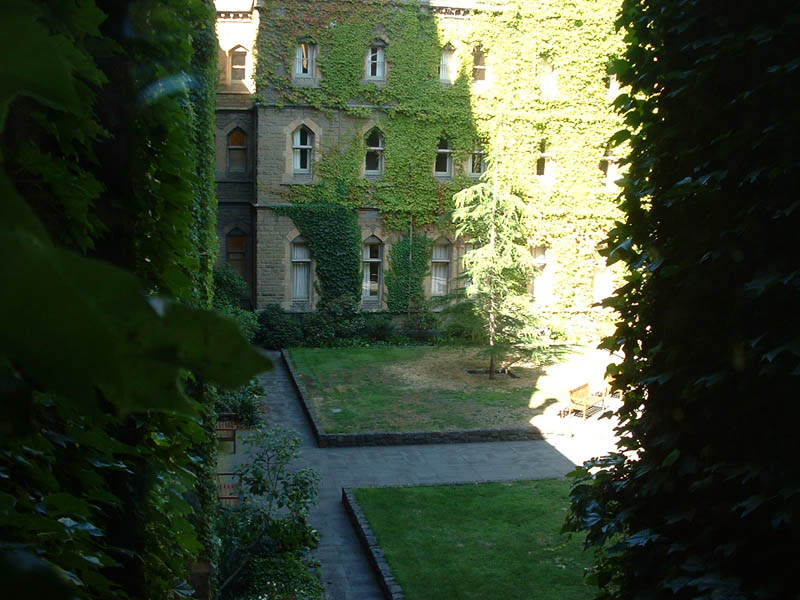
View into main courtyard

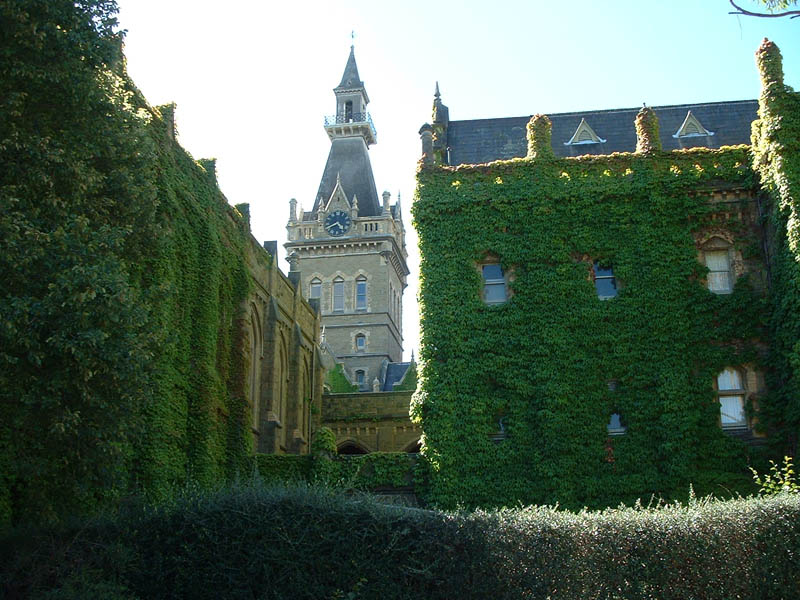
Creeper-covered exterior of Ormond College

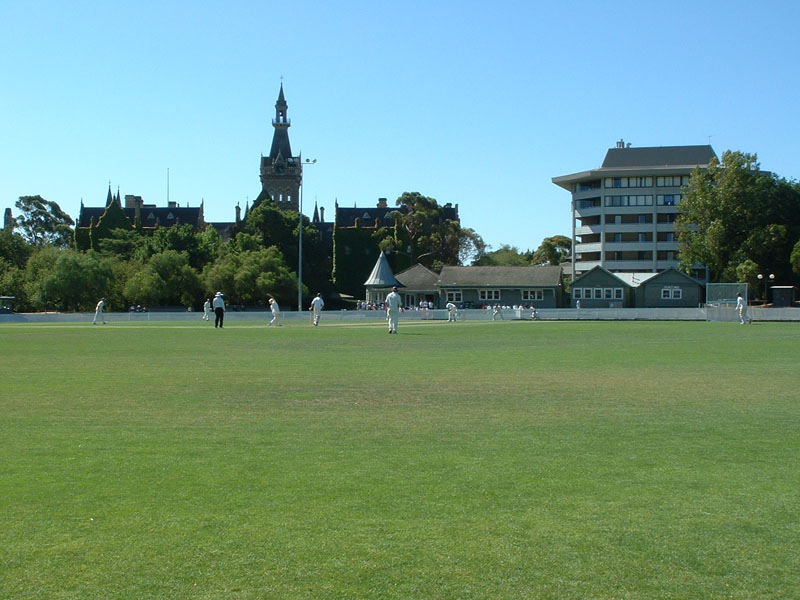
View from across university cricket oval

The period after World War II saw great demands for accommodation; for the first time the college passed 150 students. Following an appeal for funds in 1949, a series of improvements were made to Main Building. The kitchens were extensively modernised and general maintenance was brought up to date after the lag resulting from the Depression of the 1930s and the shortages of men and material during and after the War. In 1955, a squash court was built to commemorate the Ormond men who died in the Second World War. A new Master's residence was designed by the prominent architects Grounds, Romberg and Boyd and was completed in 1958. At the same time, a permanent residence was provided for the Vice-Master by the conversion of a rooms of the old lodge (Allen House) and the addition of a semi-circular cream brick building.

=== Innovation (1960s) ===
During the 1960s, the college continued to work with Grounds, Romberg and Boyd to create groundbreaking buildings. In the vacation of 1960–61, a new domestic wing was built to accommodate the extra staff and facilities required for the larger college planned for 1962. The three octagon-shaped buildings that constitute Picken Court were built during 1961 and were ready for occupation in 1962, providing accommodation for around 100 students and eight tutors. The chancellor of the university, Sir Arthur Dean, opened the building in March 1962.

New premises for the MacFarland Library were built in 1965, which were combined with a new theological hall common room. The former library became the chapel, the official opening of which took place on 19 March 1967. For the first time the college had its own place of worship, as befits a church foundation. In 1982 the library was reorganised, separating the Ormond College and Joint Theological College collections.

In 1968, a striking and bold building was opened in the south-east corner of the college grounds in the style later named brutalism. The chancellor of the university, Sir Robert Menzies, officially opened the southeast building and named it McCaughey Court after the master, Davis McCaughey. This building, which caused much comment, won awards for the architects Romberg and Boyd.

=== Sexual assault allegations (1991) ===
Ormond College was embroiled in controversy in 1991 over allegations that the master of the college had sexually assaulted two female students at a Valedictory party and that the college council had dismissed these complaints out of hand. The master was convicted of one charge of assault, however the conviction was later overturned on appeal, though he resigned his position. The events of this controversy were written into a 1995 book by Helen Garner, The First Stone, which itself was embroiled in controversy over bias toward the master, its criticism of third wave feminism and fictionalisation of various events and circumstances. Since this case, Ormond College has reformed its procedures in regards to sexual harassment and assault.

=== 21st century ===
In 2009, Rufus Black was appointed master of Ormond College. An ethicist and Rhodes scholar, Black ushered in a new era of change and development. In that year, Ormond launched an Indigenous program which supported Aboriginal and Torres Strait Islander students to live at Ormond and study at the University of Melbourne.

The college developed also major new facilities during this period. In 2010 the junior common room was redeveloped into cafe style space and lounge. In May 2011 the college opened a $4m student academic centre, containing several formal and informal learning spaces along with the college library and information technology facilities. Since 2010 the college has expanded its undergraduate facilities by creating a series of loft rooms in its main building and McCaughey Court. The college has also developed a cohort of graduate students in its two dedicated graduate buildings opened in 2014 and 2015.

In 2016, the college opened the Wade Institute of Entrepreneurship. Established with a gift from entrepreneur Peter Wade, the institute delivers programs for investors, entrepreneurs and schools, including a new University of Melbourne Masters of Entrepreneurship. The degree is a collaboration between Ormond and the university's Faculty of Business and Economics and its School of Engineering. The building is designed along "passivhaus" principles, by Melbourne architectural firm Lovell Chen.

In 2018, Lara McKay became master of Ormond.

== Admission of women ==
From the beginning Ormond accepted women as non-residents, able to attend tutorials and participate in college life whilst living offsite with funding from the college. Female students were amongst its most notable early scholars. Later, from 1968 to 1972, female students were able to live in college in return for waiting duties and attend tutorials; they were admitted as members of the Ormond College Students' Club in 1969. In 1973, Ormond accepted women students as residents for the first time. Women quickly rose to leadership roles in both the staff and student bodies including being elected chair of the students' club and appointed to the role of vice-master (deputy head of college).

== Renate Kamener Oration ==
Renate Kamener (8 June 1933 – 12 March 2009) was a German-born Jew whose family escaped before the Holocaust and settled in South Africa, where she became a teacher. She and her husband Bob were active in the anti-apartheid movement and migrated to Australia in 1965, where after teaching English for some time she became head of Humanities at Swinburne Technical College. She was dedicated to peace and social justice, and founded Salaam-Shalom, a Muslim-Jewish women's group that promoted dialogue and friendship.

To honour her memory, the Kamener Family set up the Renate Kamener in collaboration with Ormond College, "to help and encourage Indigenous students to achieve their tertiary education ambitions". It is funded mainly by the annual Renate Kamener Oration, managed by volunteers. Past speakers at the oration include:

- 2010: Peter Singer
- 2011: Gareth Evans
- 2012: Glyn Davis
- 2013: James Button
- 2014: Mark Dreyfus
- 2015: Marcia Langton
- 2016: Julian Burnside
- 2017: Abdi Aden
- 2018: Tim Costello
- 2019: Julia Gillard
- 2020: Jon Faine
- 2021: (Cancelled – COVID-19 pandemic)
- 2022: Noel Pearson
- 2023: Catherine Liddle
- 2024: Thomas Mayo (22 September)
- 2025: Helen Clark

== List of Masters ==
- 1881–1914, Sir John Henry MacFarland
- 1915–1943, David Kennedy Picken
  - J.C. McPhee, acting master, August 1943 – September 1944
  - Revd J. E. Owen, acting master, September 1944 – December 1945
- 1946–1953, Sir Stanley L. Prescott
- 1954–1958, Brinley Newton-John
  - Revd John S. Alexander, acting master, 1959
- 1959–1979, John Davis McCaughey AC
- 1980–1989, David Henry Parker
- 1990–1993, Alan Gregory, AM
  - September 1992 – December 1993, acting master Kenneth Robin Jackson)
- 1994–2008, Hugh Norman Collins
- 2009–2017, Rufus E. R. Black
  - 2017–2018 Robert Leach, acting master
- 2018–2024, Lara McKay
- 2024–present, Areti Metuamate

== Chairs of Council ==
- 1881–1903, Alexander Morrison
- 1903–1910, Robert Gillespie MP
- 1910–1926, John Matthew
- 1926–1942, Rev William Borland
- 1942–1943, Henry Bremner Lewis
- 1943–1943, William Gray
- 1943–1944, John Claude McPhee OBE
- 1944–1946, Rev John Clark-Jones
- 1947–1947, Rev David Seymour Broughton
- 1947–1954, Rev John Evan Eric Owen
- 1960–1960, Rev L O C White
- 1966–1966, J S Coltman
- 1985–1991, Hon Sir George Lush QC
- 1991–1992, Sir Daryl Michael Dawson AC KBE CB KC
- 1995–1998, David William (Bill) Rogers AO
- 1998–2001, David Abraham AM
- 2010–2022, Andrew Michelmore AO
- 2022–present, Richard Loveridge

== Notable alumni ==
=== Politics and government ===
- Neil Brown – politician, Commonwealth Attorney General
- John Button – politician who served as a senior minister in the Hawke and Keating Labor governments.
- Mark Dreyfus – federal member for Isaacs, Attorney General of Australia
- Sir Littleton Groom – federal minister and Speaker in Federal Parliament
- Greg Hunt – federal member for Flinders, Federal Minister for Health
- Rod Kemp – politician and federal government minister
- David Kemp – politician and federal government minister
- John Langmore – federal politician, academic and diplomat
- Ian Macfarlan – Premier of Victoria
- Richard Marles – deputy prime minister of Australia
- Sir Robert Menzies – Prime Minister of Australia (Menzies was a non-resident postgraduate law tutor)
- Sir Frank Keith Officer – was an Australian public servant and diplomat
- Sir George Reid – MP and cabinet minister
- Tim Smith – Victorian state politician
- Haddon Storey – politician and Attorney General of Victoria
- Alan Tudge – Minister for Education
- Sir (John) Keith Waller – Senior Australian public servant and diplomat.
- Vernon Wilcox – Victorian State Transport Minister and Attorney General

=== Law ===
- Sir Keith Aickin – justice of the High Court of Australia
- Philip Alston – international law scholar and human rights practitioner, John Norton Pomeroy Professor of Law at New York University School of Law
- Hilary Charlesworth – Melbourne Laureate Professor at the University of Melbourne, director of the Centre for International Governance and justice at the Australian National University
- Alex Chernov – Supreme Court justice and Governor of Victoria
- Rowan Downing – barrister and international jurist, member of the international judiciary of the Extraordinary Chambers in the Courts of Cambodia
- Sir Daryl Michael Dawson – former justice of the High Court of Australia
- Sir David Derham – lawyer and university administrator, expert in Australian constitutional law. Monash University Law School is called the David Derham School of Law in his honour
- Sir Wilfred Fullagar – justice who served on the High Court of Australia and previously the Supreme Court of Victoria
- Kenneth Hayne – former justice of the High Court of Australia and royal commissioner
- Kate Jenkins – federal sex discrimination minister
- Sir John Latham – politician and judge who served as the fifth Chief Justice of Australia
- Sir George Lush – Supreme Court justice
- Timothy McEvoy – justice of Federal Court of Australia.
- Clifford Menhennitt – justice of the Supreme Court of Victoria who delivered the landmark 1969 Menhennitt ruling
- Alastair Nicholson – retired Australian jurist who served as the Chief Justice of the Family Court of Australia from 1988 until 2004
- William John Schutt – justice Supreme Court of Victoria.
- Ross Robson – justice of the Supreme Court of Victoria
- Richard Henry Searby – was an Australian lawyer, company director and academic.
- Ross Sundberg – former judge in the Federal Court of Australia from 1995 to 2010
- Sir Henry Winneke – justice of the Supreme Court and Governor of Victoria
- John Winneke – justice of the Supreme Court of Victoria and president of the Court of Appeal of the Supreme Court of Victoria

=== Business ===
- David Crawford – businessman and company director
- Sir Peter Derham – business executive and philanthropist who was managing director of Nylex
- Sir Archibald Glenn – industrialist and founding chancellor of La Trobe University and chairman of the Ormond College Council
- Charles Goode – Stockbroker and public company director
- Ben Gray – private equity investor who is a founding partner of the private equity firm BGH Capital and former head of TPG
- Sir Russell Grimwade – chemist, botanist, industrialist and philanthropist
- Sir Ian McLennan – chairman of BHP
- Andrew Michelmore – mining executive, company director and former chair of the Ormond College Council; rowing world championship gold medal in 1974
- Ziggy Switkowski – business executive, nuclear physicist, chief executive officer of Telstra and Chancellor of the Royal Melbourne Institute of Technology (RMIT University)

=== Academia ===
- Robert Bartnik – mathematician, serving as professor of mathematics at Monash University
- Don Chambers – historian, author and heritage advocate
- Sir Thomas MacFarland Cherry – mathematician, serving as professor of mathematics (pure, mixed and applied) at the University of Melbourne from 1929 to 1963
- Sir Zelman Cowen – was an Australian legal scholar and university administrator who served as the 19th Governor-General of Australia, in office from 1977 to 1982
- Rod Crewther – physicist, notable in the field of gauge field theories
- Graeme Davison – Australian historian who is the Sir John Monash Distinguished Professor in the School of Historical Studies at Monash University
- Catherine Joan Ellis – was an Australian ethnomusicologist. She co-founded the Centre for Aboriginal Studies in Music (CASM) at the University of Adelaide in 1972.
- Sir Kerr Grant – Australian physicist and a significant figure in higher education administration in South Australia in the first half of the twentieth century.
- Andrew Bruce Holmes – research chemist and professor at the Bio21 Institute, Melbourne, Australia, and the past president of the Australian Academy of Science
- Patrick McCaughey - art historian and academic
- Stuart Macintyre – historian, academic and public intellectual, president of the Academy of the Social Sciences in Australia
- Neil McQueen – educational innovator, scientist, psychologist and medical doctor
- Joanna Masel – theoretical evolutionary biologist. Since 2016 she has been a full professor of ecology and evolutionary biology at the University of Arizona
- Sir George Whitecross Paton – legal scholar and vice-Chancellor of Melbourne University from 1951 until 1968
- Edwin James George Pitman – Australian mathematician; made significant contributions to statistics and probability theory
- Brigadier Sir Lindsay Tasman Ride - physiologist, soldier, and vice chancellor of the University of Hong Kong
- Geoffrey Serle – was an Australian historian, who specialised on the colony of Victoria
- Peter Singer is a moral philosopher and Emeritus Ira W. DeCamp Professor of Bioethics at Princeton University
- John McKellar Stewart – professor of philosophy at the University of Adelaide and its vice-chancellor from 1945 to 1948
- Hugh Stretton – historian
- Sir Kenneth Wheare– vice-Chancellor, Oxford University

=== Military ===
- Major General Rupert Downes – Australian soldier, surgeon and historian.
- Colonel Sir Edward "Weary" Dunlop – Australian World War II hero, surgeon and Wallabies player
- Major General Harold "Pompey" Elliott – senior officer in Australian Army during WWI, senator, solicitor, VFL footballer, athlete
- Brigadier General William Grant – engineer, temporary brigadier general in First AIF, commanded Australian Light Horse charge at Beersheba
- General Peter Gration – Australian Army officer, served in the positions of Chief of the General Staff (1984–87) and Chief of the Defence Force (1987–93).
- Lieutenant General Sir James McCay – Australian general and politician, champion of women's suffrage and federation

=== Medicine ===
- Sir Frank Macfarlane Burnet – Australian virologist known for his contributions to immunology; awarded a Nobel Prize in medicine
- Brigadier Sir Thomas Peel Dunhill – Australian thyroid surgeon and honorary surgeon to the monarchs of the United Kingdom
- Hilda Esson – doctor and pioneer actress
- Brigadier Sir Neil Hamilton Fairley – physician, medical scientist, and army officer who was instrumental in saving thousands of Allied lives from malaria and other diseases
- Revd John Flynn – founded the Royal Flying Doctor Service, featured on Australian $20 note, also known as "Flynn of the Inland".
- Mary Glowrey – medical missionary, founder of the Catholic Health Association of India
- Gordon Clunes Mackay Mathison – physician, medical researcher, and soldier; (Note: Note that, in certain records, such as the 1914 Electoral Roll for the East Melbourne subdivision of the Melbourne Division (p55), his family name is given with the variant spelling of "Mathieson".) appointed the first director of the Walter and Eliza Hall Institute of Medical Research in Melbourne, died from wounds received during the Gallipoli campaign before he could take up the position

=== Sport ===
- Arthur Davidson – Australian rules footballer for the Fitzroy Football Club
- Keith Doig Australian rules footballer for the Melbourne University Football Club
- Donald Duffy – chairman of the Melbourne Football Club
- Chris Fogarty – Australian rules footballer for the Essendon Football Club
- Joe Fogarty – Australian rules footballer for the Melbourne Football Club
- Henry Hagenauer – Australian rules footballer for the Melbourne Football Club
- Gerry Hazlitt – Australian test cricketer, master at The Kings School and Haileybury College.
- Jim Howden – Australian Rower, Olympic bronze medalist and county court judge
- Charles Littlejohn – Olympic silver medallist in rowing, Rhodes Scholar
- Richard Loveridge – Australian rules footballer for the Hawthorn Football Club, Solicitor and Chair Ormond College Council (2022 - )
- Stan Reid – Australian rules footballer for the Fitzroy Football Club
- Paul Sheahan – test cricketer, president of the Melbourne Cricket Club
- Raymond “Ray” Steele – an Australian rules footballer who played for the Richmond Football Club and cricket administrator
- Westmore Frank Stephens – was an Australian rules footballer who played with University in the Victorian Football League (VFL).
- James Sutherland – CEO of Cricket Australia and Sheffield Shield cricketer for Victoria

=== Media and arts ===
- Graeme Blundell – actor, director, producer, writer, playwright, lyricist and biographer
- John Duigan – film director
- Phil Harvey – manager of Coldplay
- Elijah Moshinsky – opera director, theatre director and television director who worked for the Royal Opera House, the Metropolitan Opera, the Royal National Theatre and BBC Television
- John Bernard O'Hara – poet and schoolmaster
- Mark Seymour – singer and musician in Hunters and Collectors

=== Rhodes scholars ===
- John Seitz (1906)
- Charles Littlejohn (1909)
- Neil MacNeil (1914)
- Donald Sandral (1916)
- Patrick Hamilton (1917)
- William Hancock (1920)
- Lindsay Ride (1922)
- George Paton (1926)
- Kenneth Wheare (1929)
- Richard Latham (1931)
- Ross Campbell (1933)
- Alan Treloar (1940)
- Zelman Cowen (1941)
- Hugh Stretton (1946)
- Alan Serle (1947)
- Robert Shaw (1948)
- Graeme Davison (1964)
- Alistair Christie (1967)
- Kenneth Hayne (1969)
- Colin Norman (1970)
- Graham Hutchinson (1971)
- Martin Wardrop (1974)
- Andrew Michelmore (1976)
- Richard Caro (1978)
- Michael Penington (1980)
- Ralph King (1982)
- Sharon Korman (1983)
- Timothy Orton (1986)
- Mark Moshinsky (1988)
- Mark Chiba (1989)
- Rufus Black (1991)
- Catherine Anderson (1992)
- Joanna Masel (1997)
- Kate Brennan (2007)
- John Feddersen (2008)
- Kate Robson (2008)
- Hamish McKenzie (2015)
- Bede Jones (2017)
- Rebecca Duke (2017)
- Brigid O’Farrell-White (2018)
- Mattea Mrkusic (2019)

=== Fulbright scholars ===
- Zelman Cowen (1936)
- Daryl Dawson (1951)
- Charles Goode (1959)
- Rodney Crewther (1964)
- Bruce McKellar (1973)
- Robert Bartnik (1974)
- Hilary Charlesworth (1974)
- Ted Gott (1981)
- Greg Hunt (1985)
- Fraser Cameron (1995)
- Paul R. Burgess (2009)
- Rachel Heenan (2015)
