= Teenage pregnancy in Australia =

Teenage pregnancy is pregnancy in a girl between the ages of 13 and 19. The term used in everyday speech usually refers to girls who have not yet reached legal adulthood, which in Australia is anyone under the age of 18. At the national level, the teenage birth rate has declined in the last decade. The rate was about 16 babies per 1,000 women aged 15–19 years between 2011 and 2012 but this had fallen to 11.9 births per 1,000 women aged 15–19 in 2015, the lowest figure on record. Terminations can be performed up until the 12-week mark. About half of all teenage pregnancies are terminated in Australia.

== Birth-rate ==
In 2015, the birth rate among teenage women in Australia was 11.9 births per 1,000 women. The rate has fallen from 55.5 births per 1,000 women in 1971, probably due to ease of access to effective contraception, rather than any decrease in sexual activity. The Australian Bureau of Statistics found that the median age to have a baby in Australia between 2003 and 2013 was 30.8 for mothers, and 32.3 for fathers.

== Aboriginal Australians ==
In Australia, young Indigenous women are more likely to become pregnant while in their teens than non-Indigenous young women. Many factors contribute to this gap, such as unemployment, poverty and educational outcomes. However, there is still very little understanding as to the attitudes of young Indigenous Australian women themselves in regards to pregnancy. There is a national Indigenous fertility rate of 69 per 1000, which is four times the national rate for all teenage women in Australia. The preliminary census estimated that the Indigenous population of Australia, is around 2.5% of the total Australian population which shows how radical these rates are. These findings provide clear indication towards the issues of Indigenous Australians, and the lack of support they are provided in relation to contraceptive education and access to health information. Indigenous Australians have a high rate of health illiteracy, which has also played a major role in the high fertility rates as stated above.

Historically speaking, Indigenous Australians have always had higher rates of living in rural and remote areas, which has been found to indirectly influence the rate of teenage pregnancy within this population. Region, along with many other factors, have all contributed to the high teenage fertility rate among Aboriginal Australians. To lower this, the Australian Government has created programs that aim to increase health literacy, increase access to health care and provide better education in relation to contraception and sexual activity.

Australian Youth Facts and Stats found the number of Indigenous young people aged 12–24 years was estimated to be 116,000, approximately 3% of the total number of young people nationwide, indicating the Indigenous to be a more youthful society. Along with this, Indigenous mothers are more likely to give birth at younger ages than non-Indigenous mothers. The average age of Indigenous mothers who gave birth in 2013 was 25 years, compared with an average age of 31 years for all Australian mothers.

Age-specific fertility rates, by Indigenous status of mother, Australia, 2013
| Age-group (years) | Indigenous mothers | All mothers |
|---|---|---|
| 15–19 | 63 | 15 |
| 20–24 | 134 | 52 |
| 25–29 | 124 | 100 |
| 30–34 | 88 | 125 |
| 35–39 | 48 | 71 |
| 40–44 | 11 | 15 |

== By region ==
In Australia, pregnancy and childbirth in teenage women are associated with obstetric and social risks, and there is evidence indicating that the birth rate among teenagers in rural and remote areas of Australia is not in decline. Although the number of births to teenage mothers in Australia has fallen in recent years, there is a strong suggestion that such a trend has not been found for teenagers living in remote and economically disadvantaged areas. This finding raises special concern, as there is clear evidence of an "urban-rural" divide for young women giving birth in Australia. This manifests as an increase in the odds for adverse outcomes, such as stillbirth for women delivering their babies in rural areas.

Ann Larson stated that "the higher fertility is the result of an economic growth that has sidelined young regional women, and to a lesser extent young men, who do not have the range of educational and employment opportunities to lead them into pathways other than early parenting". This statement can be backed up through various research and epidemiology indicating a direct trend between rural and remote areas, and rates of teenage pregnancy. Other issues come with living in rural areas in Australia including; high rates of teenage smokers and excessive drinkers, as well as lack of employment and in-adequate education. These risks have been linked to increased caesarean and abortion rates among mothers living in rural and remote areas. Although the above research concludes that there are extremely high teenage pregnancy rates in rural and remote areas, the Australian Bureau of Statistics found that the distribution of births in Australia are lowest in remote areas. These statistics can be viewed in the table below.

Distribution of births in Australia by remoteness area of usual residence and Indigenous status
| Australian region | Distribution of births (%) |
|---|---|
| Major cities | 69 |
| Inner regional | 18 |
| Outer regional | 10 |
| Remote and very remote | 3 |

== Effects ==
Teenage mothers have been closely associated with long term health risks, including mental and physical health. Along with these health risks, teenage mothers in Australia commonly experience lack of identity, social issues, low income and poor educational backgrounds. This often leads to their child(ren) experiencing the same issues throughout life, and may lead to other serious complications.

A recent study found teenage mothers were more likely to:

- drop out of school
- have no or low qualifications
- be unemployed or low paid
- live in poor housing conditions
- suffer from depression, which may result in suicide
- live on welfare

Although this does not apply to all teenage mothers, one or more of the above apply to the majority. It has also been indicated that children of teenage mothers are more likely to:

- live in poverty
- grow up without a father
- become a victim of neglect or abuse
- do less well at school
- become involved in crime
- abuse drugs and alcohol
- eventually become a teenage parent and begin the cycle all over.

The above effects of teenage pregnancy in Australia have been closely researched, and statistics have found that the majority of this population are more likely to fall into one or more of the above categories. In terms of general health, the proportion of teenage mothers who report poor or fair health is nearly twice as high than other mothers. Teenagers have also been associated with high dependence on welfare agencies such as Centrelink. Birth is also much more complicated; their babies have a higher rate of suffering problems such as preterm birth, low birth weight and congenital abnormalities. Teenage pregnancy and childbirth is an important adolescent health issue in Australia due to long-term negative psychological outcomes for both mother and child and its association with detrimental physical consequences.

== Causes ==
While not all teenage pregnancies are unplanned and unintentional, unplanned pregnancies may be associated with the following issues:

- Family situations with regular conflict
- Family violence or sexual abuse during childhood
- Unstable housing arrangements
- Living in out-of-home care
- Poor school performance and attendance
- Low socioeconomic background
- Family history of pregnancies at a young age
- Low level of maternal education
- Low self-esteem
- Undisclosed same-sex attraction
- Aboriginal or Torres Strait Islander status
- Living in rural and remote areas
- Having a mental health diagnosis

Persistent high rates in English-speaking countries have been attributed to their ambivalent attitude and hence behavior towards contraception, sex education and mass communication about sexuality, their welfare provision for unmarried mothers and their social inequalities. Studies have indicated that girls who report first sexual intercourse during their early teen years have higher rates of teenage pregnancy than girls who delay their sexual activity until they are older. A further study found a strong association between high rates of pregnancy and partner violence. This same study also indicated high rates of miscarriages and terminations in relation to the same issue of partner violence. There have been other studies that have indicated association between partner violence and preterm birth, which further indicates that violence in partnerships plays a great role in issues relating to teenage pregnancy, specifically in Australia.

Women of all ages who are experiencing violence and abuse can be subject to coercive sex and unprotected intercourse, leading to a higher rate of unplanned and unwanted pregnancies, however this rate is much higher in teenagers.

Whilst the majority of Australian women are aware of contraception and the reasons behind the use of these mechanisms, many use it either inconsistently or not at all. Motivation has been indicated to influence peoples attitudes towards contraception, and this has been found to fluctuate in different contexts, such as romantic relationships.

Given this information, the notion of contraceptive use being the behavioral link between reproductive outcomes and pregnancy attitudes, some advocates have argued that sexual health policy makers and clinicians must remove themselves from the assumption that teenagers are motivated to avoid pregnancy.

== Controversies ==
Opinions on teenage pregnancy worldwide often reflect prejudice of one kind or another, and in Australia it is the negative kind. These opinions are sometimes polarized however there is usually no conflict in relation to the strategies of trying to avoid unwanted pregnancies in adolescents. Both arguments towards teenage pregnancy, positive and negative, usually support the practice of healthy sexual activity and encourage young women to grow in knowledge and social skills. Despite a demographic shift that has seen the average age of women giving birth in Australia increase to over 30 years, roughly 5% of deliveries still occur to teenagers. This provides great controversy as many people argue against putting more money and time into reducing teenage pregnancies, as the rate isn't "high enough". The argument against this however, is that the rate can decrease even more with better education and increased access to health services, and that teenage health should be a major priority in Australia. Overall, research has been found to suggest that early intervention that prevents people from relying on welfare may be more important in reducing utilization of welfare benefits in the future, by teenage mothers. This is because state dependence plays a bigger role in higher welfare reliance of teenage mothers. In Australia, policy-makers have been mainly concerned with the potential interference of teenage motherhood with teenage mothers’ school education, because lower education has been indicated to be associated with adverse labour market outcomes and hence higher welfare dependency.

The tax burden of social support for teenage mothers is an issue in Australian public discourse.

Many argue that teenage pregnancy is a choice and teenage mothers should have to live with the issues associated with this choice. This is backed up by a growing number of studies suggesting that the level of control an adolescent maintains over their contraceptive behaviour is the strongest predictor of pregnancy outcomes, and inconsistent and non users of contraception have much higher odds of becoming pregnant compared to consistent users. However this view point has been challenged by further research stating that despite obvious links between behaviour and outcome, there is no study that fully understands the basic processes influencing adolescent’s sexual and reproductive choices, including contraceptive use.

A growing number of studies also suggest that, although teenage pregnancy may be perceived as problematic by Australian society, young people usually regard it differently.

== Epidemiology ==
Pregnant teenagers in Australia have a caesarean section rate of 13.4% compared to 33.4% among women aged over 40.

A third of teenage mothers become pregnant again within two years of their first child which has indicated to be because of poor contraceptive use, according to research published in The Medical Journal of Australia.

A Western Australian based study followed 150 first-time mothers and found that most of the teenagers were having sex again within 3 months of the birth of their babies, and in total 47 were pregnant again within 2 years. Two were said to be pregnant just 6 weeks after their first birth.

In Australia in 1995 there were 43.6 pregnancies per 1000 young women aged 15–19 years, and this rate had been stable for the previous 10 years. This is relatively low in comparison to the same age group in the USA (83.6 per 1000), and is comparable to other Western developed nations like New Zealand (54 per 1000), United Kingdom (47 per 1000) and Canada (45.4 per 1000). Overall in Australia in 1995, there were 19.8 births and 23.8 terminations per thousand young women aged 15–19 years.

Australia's teenage fertility rate is higher than most developed countries outside the United States and the United Kingdom. In addition, Australia has one of the highest abortion rates in this age group, with the proportion of pregnancies ending in abortion having increased from 20% to over 50% over the past 30 years. This figure has since remained stable.

In 2013, the birth rate in Australia among young women was 14.6 births per 1,000 women.

1 in 25 live births in Australia in 2009 were to teenage mothers, and two in every 100 girls aged between 15 and 19 years become pregnant every year.

== See also ==
- Safe sex
- Teenage pregnancy in the United States
- Abortion in Australia
- Ages of consent in Oceania
- Unintended pregnancy
