= Abortion Law Reform Act 2019 =

Australian state law

Parliament of New South Wales
- Long title: An Act about reforming the law relating to terminations of pregnancies and regulating the conduct of health practitioners in relation to terminations.
- Citation: Act No. 11 of 2019
- Territorial extent: New South Wales
- Considered by: Legislative Assembly
- Considered by: Legislative Council
- Assented to by: Governor Margaret Beazley
- Assented to: 2 October 2019
- Commenced: 2 October 2019
- Administered by: Minister for Health

Legislative history
- Bill title: Reproductive Health Care Reform Bill
- Introduced by: Alex Greenwich
- First reading: 1 August 2019
- Second reading: 8 August 2019
- Voting summary: 56 voted for; 33 voted against; 4 absent
- Consideration in Detail: 8 August 2019
- Third reading: 8 August 2019
- Voting summary: 59 voted for; 31 voted against; 3 absent
- Passed: 8 August 2019
- Bill title: Reproductive Health Care Reform Bill
- Member(s) in charge: Penny Sharpe
- First reading: 20 August 2019
- Second reading: 21 August 2019
- Voting summary: 26 voted for; 15 voted against; 1 absent
- Committee of the Whole: 17 September 2019–25 September 2019
- Third reading: 25 September 2019
- Voting summary: 26 voted for; 14 voted against; 2 absent
- Passed with amendments: 25 September 2019
- amendments considered by the: 26 September 2019
- Finally passed both chambers: 26 September 2019

Amends
- Section 82 of the Crimes Act 1900

Repeals
- Sections 83 and 84 of the Crimes Act 1900

Amended by
- Section 30C of the Interpretation Act 1987

Related legislation
- Crimes Act 1900

Keywords
- Abortion, Termination, Pregnancy
- Status: Amended

The Abortion Law Reform Act 2019, introduced as the Reproductive Health Care Reform Bill 2019 in the New South Wales Legislative Assembly, is an Act of the Parliament of New South Wales which removed abortion from the Crimes Act 1900, allows abortions for up to 22 weeks, and permits an abortion after 22 weeks if two medical doctors agree. The Act received royal assent on 2 October 2019, and commenced with immediate effect. With the commencement of the Act, New South Wales became the last state or territory in Australia to decriminalise abortion.

== History ==
=== Legislative passage ===
The Abortion Law Reform Act 2019 was first introduced as the Reproductive Health Care Reform Bill into the New South Wales Parliament's lower house, the New South Wales Legislative Assembly, by independent Member of Parliament (MP) Alex Greenwich on 1 August 2019. The Private member's bill had fifteen sponsors, including New South Wales Health and Medical Research Minister Brad Hazzard. MPs were granted a conscience vote on the Bill. The Bill passed its third reading with amendments on 8 August 2019, with 59 in favour and 31 against. The bill attracted heated demonstrations and counter-demonstrations by both pro-choice and pro-life groups.

The Reproductive Health Care Reform Bill was then introduced to the Parliament's upper house, the New South Wales Legislative Council, by the NSW Labor upper house leader Penny Sharpe on 20 August 2019. The Bill passed its third reading with amendments on 25 September 2019. The amended bill was then returned to the Legislative Assembly as the Abortion Law Reform Bill on 26 September 2019. The Legislative Assembly accepted the amendments on the same day. These amendments included requiring a medical practitioner to provide medical care and treatment to a child born as a result of termination and banning sex-selection abortions. The Bill was granted royal assent on 2 October 2019, and became law.

== The Act ==
It allows a medical practitioner to perform an abortion on a person who is not more than 22 weeks pregnant and can give informed consent. If the person lacks the capacity to give informed consent to the termination, the medical professional can obtain permission from a person lawfully authorised to give consent on the person's behalf. Abortions after the 22 weeks gestation period can be performed if the specialist medical practitioner has consulted with another specialist medical practitioner. Medical practitioners are also required to assess whether the patient will need counselling.

The Act also requires conscientious objecting medical practitioners to inform the patient about their conscientious objection, and to provide them with information about accessing other medical practitioners and transferring the patient to another practitioner or health service willing to conduct the termination. The Act also requires medical practitioners to provide appropriate medical care and treatment to a person born as a result of a termination.

The Act repeals Sections 83 and 84, and amends Section 82 of the Crimes Act 1900. It creates a new offence for an unqualified person to carry out or to assist in a termination; punishable by seven years imprisonment. The Act also makes it an offence to intimidate someone into having an abortion performed, including for the purpose of sex selection.

== Amendment ==
In 2025, an amendment to the Act made its way through parliament that seeks to expand access to abortion services provided through the public health system.

== See also ==
- Abortion in Australia
- Late termination of pregnancy
