= George Lush =

Australian judge and barrister (1912–2000)

The Honourable Sir George Lush QC

Chancellor of Monash University
- In office 1983–1992
- Preceded by: Sir Richard Eggleston
- Succeeded by: David Rogers

Judge of the Supreme Court of Victoria
- In office 1 February 1966 – 5 October 1983

Personal details
- Born: George Hermann Lush; 5 October 1912 Hawthorn, Victoria, Australia
- Died: 5 April 2000 (aged 87) Richmond, Victoria, Australia
- Spouse: Lady Betty Lush (m. 1943; died 2005)
- Education: Carey Baptist Grammar School
- Alma mater: University of Melbourne
- Occupation: Barrister; judge; lecturer

Military service
- Allegiance: Australia
- Branch/service: Australian Army
- Years of service: 1940–1946
- Rank: Captain
- Unit: 9th Division
- Battles/wars: World War II; Middle East Campaign; Siege of Tobruk; New Guinea Campaign; Kokoda Track Campaign

Sir George Hermann Lush QC (5 October 1912 – 5 April 2000) was an Australian lawyer, Supreme Court Judge and Chancellor of Monash University.

== Early life and education ==
Lush was born in Hawthorn, a suburb of Melbourne to a Baptist family in 1912. His father, George was a successful merchant and his brother, Robert was a World War One hero, who was awarded the Military Cross (MC) for gallantry.

Lush began his education at Carey Baptist Grammar School, where he matriculated in 1929 as a school prefect and dux. Afterwards, he studied at the University of Melbourne to obtain a Master of Laws (ML) while at Ormond College.

== Career ==
In 1935, Lush joined the Victorian Bar, in which he established a law practise. Despite those initial successes, Lush put his career on hold in order to join the Second Australian Imperial Force (AIF) in 1940. He would eventually serve in the Middle East and New Guinea, of which he rose to the rank of Captain upon his decommissioning in 1946.

After the war, Lush re-established his fledgling law practise while also lecturing at the University of Melbourne's Faculty of Law. He would be appointed a Queen's Counsel (QC) in 1957 and would rise to become the Chairman of both the Victorian Bar Association and Australian Bar Association in the early 1960s.

In February 1966, Lush was appointed a Judge of the Supreme Court of Victoria and would serve in that role until October 1983.

After his time as a judge, Monash University appointed him its next Chancellor in 1983. He would lead the University through difficult times due to the reduced funding by the Commonwealth Government for tertiary education. Lush served in that capacity for nine years until his retirement in 1992.

== Honours and awards ==
- 1978 – Knighted by Queen Elizabeth II for services to the law
- 1993 – Honorary Doctor of Law at Monash University
