= Arthur Davidson (footballer, born 1875) =

Australian rules footballer (1875–1961)

Irving Davidson

Personal information
- Full name: Arthur Irving Davidson
- Born: 28 August 1875; Carlton, Victoria
- Died: 5 September 1961 (aged 86); Heidelberg, Victoria
- Original team: Ormond College

Playing career^{1}
Years	Club	Games (Goals)
1898	Fitzroy	2 (0)
- ^{1} Playing statistics correct to the end of 1898.

Arthur Irving Davidson (28 August 1875 – 5 September 1961) was an Australian Presbyterian minister, military chaplain and Australian rules footballer who played for the Fitzroy Football Club in the Victorian Football League (VFL).

== Early life ==
The son of Presbyterian Minister Rev. Arthur Davidson (1847–1924) and Helen Allen Davidson, nee Pritchard (1849–1936), Arthur Irving Davidson was born in the inner Melbourne suburb of Carlton on 28 August 1875. His father served as minister at the John Knox Church in Swanston Street in Melbourne before moving to a parish in Geelong in 1879 where Davidson spent the majority of his childhood. Irving Davidson attended the Geelong College from 1889 to 1893 where he excelled on the sporting field and in his academic studies.

== University ==
In 1894, Davidson commenced studying towards an arts degree at the University of Melbourne and he graduated with honours in 1898. During his university vacations Davidson worked as a tutor, including stints working for the Ramsay family near Birregurra and the Cumming family of Mount Fyans.

Davidson entered the Theological Hall at Ormond College where he studied theology as part of a Master of Arts degree. He was captain of the Ormond College football team and played two games with Fitzroy in the Victorian Football League during the 1898 VFL season. In 1901 Davidson graduated with a Master of Arts degree in the presence of Their Royal Highnesses, the Duke and Duchess of Cornwall and York (who later became King George V and Queen Mary).

== Ministry training ==
While at Ormond College, Davidson served as a student minister at Neerim South. Davidson then acted as locum minister of the Ryrie Street congregation in 1900 while his father visited Palestine, Europe and the United Kingdom. Later that year Davidson served as an assistant minister at the Scots' Church in Melbourne.

== Marriage ==
On 17 April 1902, Arthur Irving Davidson married Alice Hopwood McCulloch at her parents' residence of Fairmount in Neerim South. The couple had met while Davidson had been serving as a student minister.

The couple had two sons and four daughters together, all born in the period 1903 to 1913.

== Early ministry ==
Davidson accepted a call to Noorat in Western Victoria in late 1901 and he spent six years there, commencing his parish ministry in the manner that continued throughout his life, engaging closely with people and prioritising preaching and teaching. On leaving Noorat, the Elders of the congregation noted his "untiring zeal, activity and earnestness".

In 1908, Davidson and his family moved to Carlton to work in the inner-city mission of Fitzroy and then in 1910 he was called to Eaglehawk. Davidson instigated the building of a new church at Marong and his name can be seen engraved on the foundation stone of the church. Rural ministry at that time involved multiple services in scattered bush centres so he travelled by horse and buggy for miles through the bush to attend small wooden churches.

== World War I ==
On 9 February 1916 Davidson enlisted to serve as a chaplain in the Australian Imperial Force in World War I. Davidson served in the 37th Battalion as Chaplain Captain through its training days at Seymour, its voyage on the army transport Persic via Cape Town, more training at Salisbury near Stonehenge and finally, in Flanders and France. He was a chaplain who had a heart for people, a heart for those with need, and who would live out his faith wherever he was found. Writing from the front in 1917, Davidson communicated this combination of spiritual focus and practical engagement. He recalled an event three weeks prior when a composite Battalion drawn from two Australian Brigades prepared to conduct an assault on an enemy position at midnight. He wrote:

My part was the preparation of the men spiritually beforehand, and the attention to the wounded afterwards. What a splendid tune I had beforehand. It was tragic, but grand. I know that many of those men we should never see again alive. I talked to them, had service with them, dispensed the communion to them, and I found a glorious readiness and response. They were not frightened to face it, not one bit; there's not a man of them with an ounce of fear.

== Later ministry ==
After returning from France in 1918, Davidson was appointed to a parish at Hawthorn that had an association with several private schools including Scotch College, Stratherne, MLC and Tintern. Boarders from these schools attended his services and Davidson actively promoted youth groups, Sunday School, picnics, bible classes, and physical culture clubs as part of his ministry outreach. He served in Hawthorn for 22 years until his retirement in 1940 at the age of 65.

In 1936 Davidson was elected as moderator of the Presbyterian Church in Victoria.

== World War II ==
Davidson returned to chaplain duties with the military forces in World War II. He was appointed Staff Chaplain with the rank of Squadron-Leader in the Air Force for a period after which he resumed his Army commission as Chaplain Captain. These appointments involved considerable air travel to distant bases in Australia, including Darwin. He received the Efficiency Decoration in recognition of his services.

== Death ==
Arthur Irving Davidson died at the Heidelberg Repatriation Hospital in 1961.
