= Clifford Menhennitt =

Australian judge

Clifford Inch Menhennitt (30 October 1912 - 29 October 1979) was an Australian jurist. He served as a Justice of the Supreme Court of Victoria from 1966 to 1979. While largely unknown today, Menhennitt was responsible for delivering the landmark 1969 Menhennitt ruling, which was the first legal precedent with regard to abortion law in Australia.

== Early life and education ==
Menhennitt was born in Melbourne, and attended Scotch College and the University of Melbourne where he’s was resident of Ormond College. He was an excellent student, and won the E. J. B. Nunn Scholarship and the Supreme Court Prize in his final honours examination in 1933.

== Career ==
He was admitted to legal practice in 1935 with solicitor firm Alexander Grant, Dickson and Menhennitt, and worked there until his admission to the bar in 1946. A talented litigator, he appeared many times before the High Court of Australia and Privy Council, and was appointed as a Queen's Counsel in 1957. He also remained active in the legal and university communities, serving as Vice-Chair of the Victorian Bar Council and a member of the Executive of the Law Council of Australia, and working as a lecturer and serving on several governing boards at the University of Melbourne. His work with the university saw Menhennitt serve as its Warden of Convocation from 1965 to 1968, and as a member of the University Council from 1968 to 1973.

Menhennitt was appointed as an Acting Judge of the Supreme Court of Victoria on 27 April 1966, and quickly impressed with his capabilities. The Australian Bar Gazette stated that during his time in the position, he had "revealed learning and skill in the conduct of trials in matters far removed from his previous fields of practice." Six months later, Sir Norman O'Bryan retired from the bench, and on 17 October, Menhennitt was appointed as his replacement. Menhennitt was highly regarded for both his knowledge and efficiency during his time on the court, and had a reputation for being relatively quick in returning decisions. While on the court, he was the original judge in charge of the Building Cases List, and was later responsible for the Commercial Causes List. He also served as chairman of Victorian Council of Law Reporting from 1974 until his death, and had also been a member of the Chief Justice's Law Reform Committee.

Though he was on the court for thirteen years, Menhennitt remains most well known for one particular case, R v Davidson, commonly known as the Menhennitt ruling. It was the first legal precedent in Australia concerning the legality of abortion, and Menhennitt ruled that abortion was lawfully justified if "necessary to preserve the physical or mental health of the woman concerned, provided that the danger involved in the abortion did not outweigh the danger which the abortion was designed to prevent." It was later largely adopted by courts in New South Wales and Queensland (with the Levine ruling of 1971 and McGuire ruling of 1986 respectively), and was influential in some other states. Menhennitt's ruling remained the basis for abortion law in Victoria for almost 40 years, until the Abortion Law Reform Act 2008 (Vic) formally decriminalised abortion.

== Death ==
Menhennitt died suddenly at his North Balwyn home on 29 October 1979, the day before his 67th birthday, and was found by his driver, who had come to take him to the court. The Supreme Court held a special sitting in his honour the following day, whereupon Chief Justice Sir John Young paid tribute to Menhennitt's distinguished career.

== See also ==
- Judiciary of Australia
- List of Judges of the Supreme Court of Victoria
- Victorian Bar Association
