= Rod Crewther =

Australian physicist (1945–2020)

- Born: 23 September 1945
- Died: 17 December 2020 (aged 75); Adelaide, Australia
- Education: California Institute of Technology; Melbourne University
- Known for: Gauge field theory
- Awards: Fulbright scholarship
- Scientific career
- Fields: Physicist
- Workplaces: University of Adelaide; CERN; Cornell University; Fermi National Accelerator Laboratory; University of Berne; University of Dortmund; Max Planck Institute
- Doctoral advisor: Murray Gell-Mann

Rodney James Crewther (23 September 1945 – 17 December 2020) was a physicist, notable in the field of gauge field theories.

== Education ==
After gaining his MSc at Melbourne University where he was resident at Ormond College, Crewther was awarded a Fulbright scholarship to the California Institute of Technology. He studied under the tutelage of Nobel prizewinner Murray Gell-Mann and completed his doctorate, in 1971, after successfully defending his dissertation against the renowned theorist Richard Feynman. His thesis was entitled Spontaneous Breakdown of Conformal and Chiral Invariance.

== Career ==
After his PhD, he held postdoctoral appointments at Cornell University in Ithaca, New York and the Fermi National Accelerator Laboratory in Batavia, Illinois. Subsequently, he spent twelve years in Europe, six of them as a Staff Member of the European Laboratory for Particle Physics (CERN) in Geneva, and the remainder as a research associate at the University of Berne, University of Dortmund, and at the Max Planck Institute in Munich. Crewther was then appointed as a senior lecturer in physics at the University of Adelaide.

Having a keen interest in politics, Crewther was vice-president of the University of Adelaide branch of the National Tertiary Education Union. He also served on the University Council.

== Teaching ==
He designed the honours physics course "Gauge Field Theories." He also lectured on Quantum Mechanics III, Advanced Dynamics and Relativity, and Honours Quantum Field Theory. For courses Quantum Mechanics II, Honours Relativistic Quantum Mechanics and Particle Physics, and Classical Fields and Mathematical Methods, his notes were followed by his successors.

Dr Crewther also taught a 4-week module of Physics 1B at the University of Adelaide where he hosted mechanics lectures that focused on the centre of mass, rotation, angular momentum and gyroscopic precession.

== Death ==
He died in 2020 around Christmas time from cancer.
