= Westmore Stephens =

Australian rules footballer (1892–1947)

Personal information
- Full name: Westmore Frank Stephens
- Born: 28 January 1892; Windsor, Victoria
- Died: 15 May 1947 (aged 55); Hawthorn, Victoria
- Original team: Geelong District

Playing career^{1}
Years	Club	Games (Goals)
1912–1914	University	10 (0)
- ^{1} Playing statistics correct to the end of 1914.

Westmore Frank Stephens (28 January 1892 – 15 May 1947) was an Australian rules footballer who played with University in the Victorian Football League (VFL).

== Family ==
The son of Westmore William Stephens and Ada Elizabeth Stephens, née Langlands, he was born in Windsor, Victoria on 28 January 1892. He married Lucy May Dawson on 17 September 1918; they had two children, Westmore Roy Stephens (1921–1983), and Joan Margaret Elizabeth Purton, née Stephens. Westmore Frank Stephens died on 15 May 1947.

== Education ==
He attended Scotch College, Melbourne, where he played for the school's First XVIII. He was Scotch's School Captain in 1911.

A resident of Ormond College, he enrolled in medicine at the University of Melbourne in 1912.

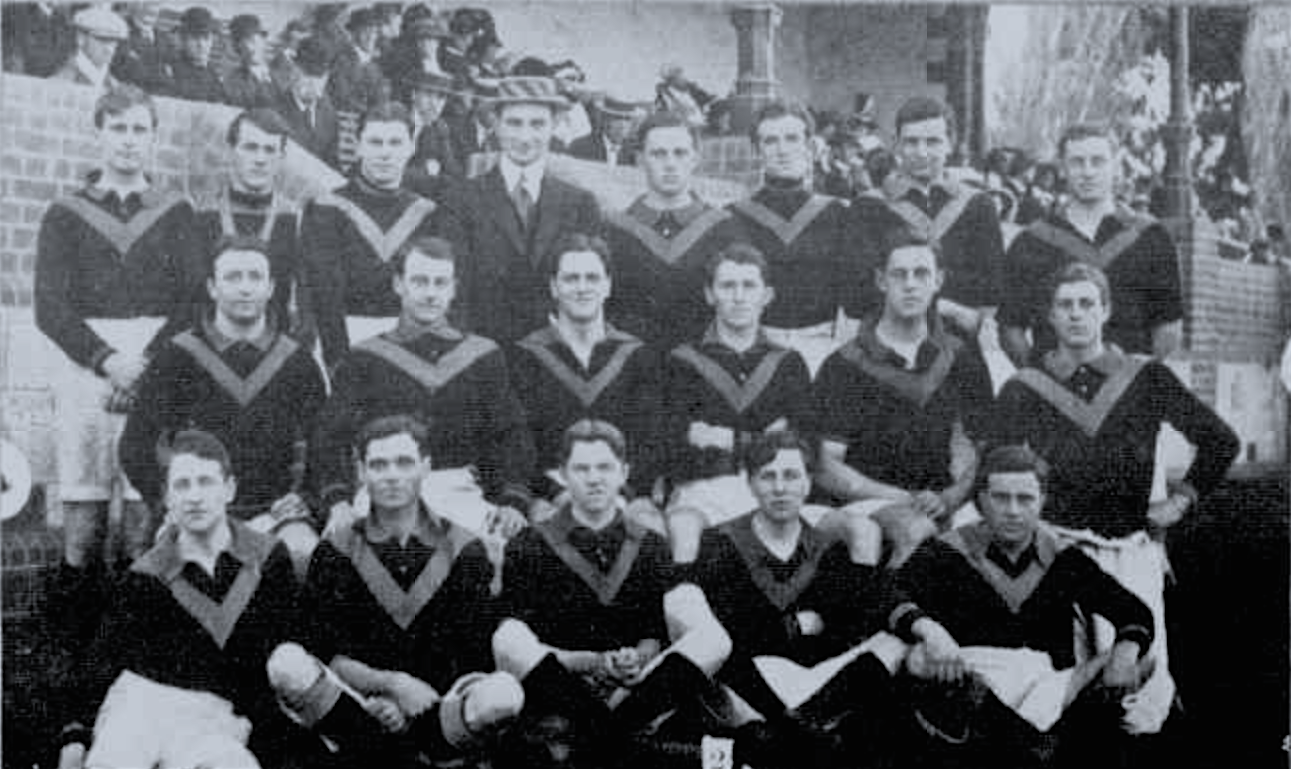
University of Melbourne's team for the annual (inter-varsity) football match against University of Adelaide, played in Adelaide on 12 August 1914 (Stephens is at far right of front row).

He graduated Bachelor of Medicine, Bachelor of Surgery (M.B., B.S.) in 1918.

== Football ==
He played Inter-Varsity football for the University of Melbourne; and was awarded both a full blue in football and a full blue in cricket.

He played his first game for University in the VFL competition, against South Melbourne, on 1 June 1912 (all the press reports have him as "Stevens"). All in all, he played a total of 10 games for University over three seasons (1912–1914); his last match was against Geelong on 16 May 1914. The university team withdrew from the VFL competition prior to the 1915 season.

== Military ==
He enlisted in the First AIF as a medical officer, serving with the Australian Army Medical Corps.
