= Joanna Masel =

Joanna Monti-Masel (also known as Joanna Masel) is an American theoretical evolutionary biologist. Since 2016 she has been a full professor of ecology and evolutionary biology at the University of Arizona. She studies the question of evolvability, namely, why evolution works given that mutations to working systems will usually be detrimental to their function.

== Early life ==
Masel was raised in Melbourne, Australia. She was educated at the University of Melbourne, taking her B.Sc. in 1996. She was awarded the 1997 Rhodes Scholarship and completed her D.Phil. in zoology at the University of Oxford in 2001. She went to Stanford University as a researcher before moving to the University of Arizona in 2004.

== Career ==
Masel has published at least 75 peer-reviewed papers. (Note: By 2023, her papers had been cited at least 5000 times, with an h-index of 32 and an i10-index of 61. The 2004 paper "Transplanted human fetal neural stem cells survive, migrate, and differentiate in ischemic rat cerebral cortex" which she co-authored had been cited over 800 times.) In 2013 she received a research grant from the John Templeton Foundation to study how and where new genes arise. She runs a theoretical group in the University of Arizona's Ecology and Evolutionary Biology department where she investigates aspects of evolvability.

Masel argues that the conventional account of the origin of new genes, namely that they are commonly duplicated from old genes and then evolve to diverge from them, is a chicken and egg explanation, since a functional gene would have to exist before a new function could evolve. She suggests instead that new genes are born continually from non-coding DNA, a form of preadaptation.

== Books ==
- Bypass Wall Street: A Biologist's Guide to the Rat Race, Perforce Publishing, 2016

== Awards and distinctions ==
- Fellow, Wissenschaftskolleg zu Berlin, 2012–13
- Outstanding Faculty Mentor, Honorable Mention, University of Arizona Undergraduate Biology Research Program, 2011
- Pew Scholar in the Biomedical Sciences, 2007
- Alfred P. Sloan Research Fellow, 2007
- Merton College Prize Scholarship, 1999
- Rhodes Scholarship, 1997
