= R v Davidson =

1969 Supreme Court of Victoria ruling

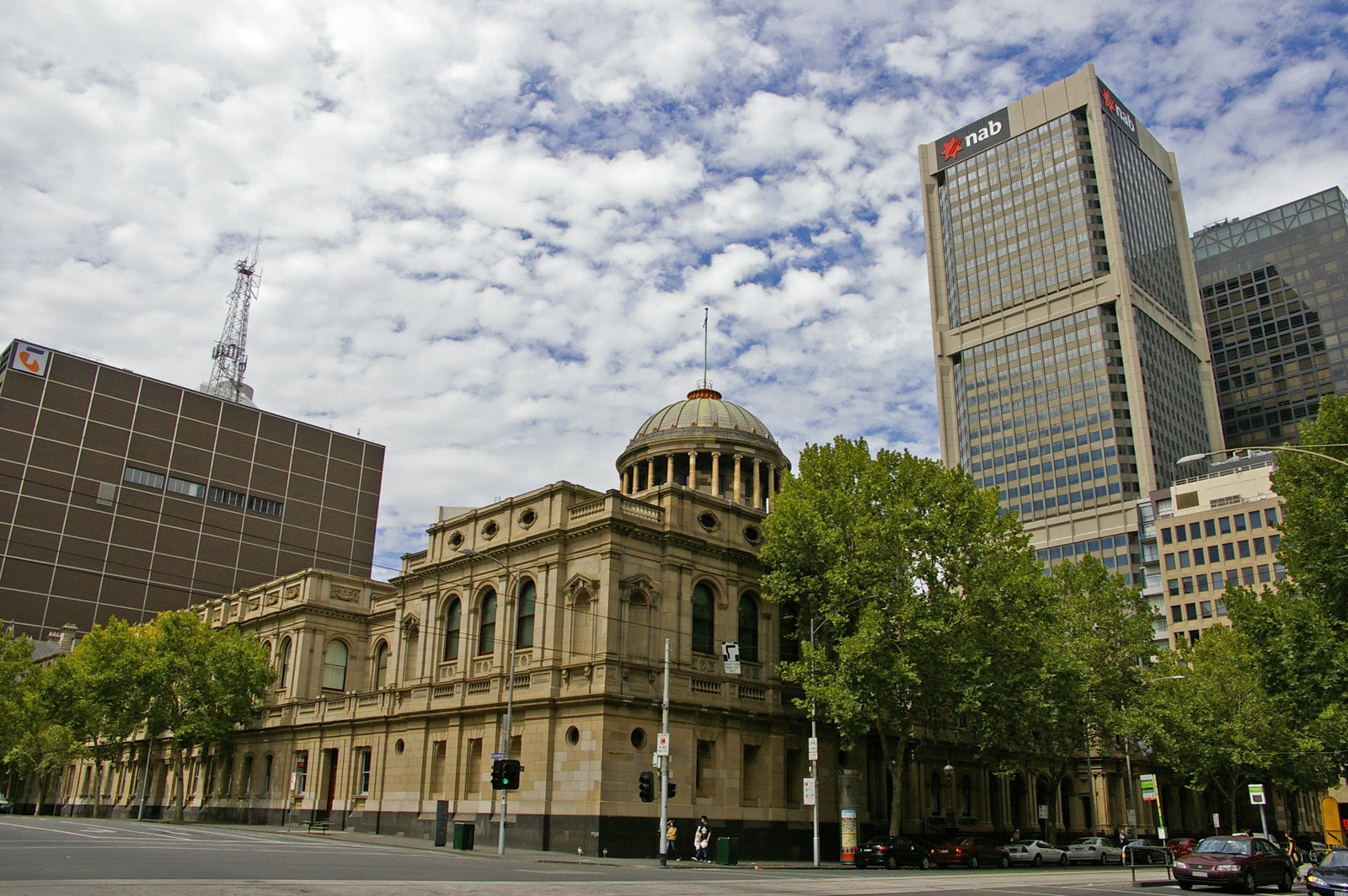
- Court: Supreme Court of Victoria
- Decided: 26 May 1969
- Citations: [1969] VicRp 85, [1969] VR 667

Court membership
- Judge sitting: Menhennitt J

Case opinions
- For an abortion to be not unlawful, the person performing the abortion must have an honest and reasonable belief that the act was: 1. necessary to protect the woman from serious danger to her life or physical or mental health; and 2. in the circumstances not out of proportion to the danger to be averted.

R v Davidson, also known (particularly among medical practitioners) as the Menhennitt ruling, was a significant ruling delivered in the Supreme Court of Victoria on 26 May 1969. It concerned the legality of abortion in the Australian state of Victoria. The ruling was not the end of the case, but rather answered certain questions of law about the admissibility of evidence, so as to allow the trial to proceed.

In the ruling, Justice Menhennitt ruled that abortion might be lawful if necessary to protect the physical or mental health of the woman, provided that the danger involved in the abortion did not outweigh the danger which the abortion was designed to prevent. It was the first ruling on the legality of abortion in any part of Australia. The principles put forward by Justice Menhennitt have since been drawn upon in other parts of the country.

== Background to the ruling ==
Charles Davidson, a medical doctor, was charged with four counts of unlawfully using an instrument to procure the miscarriage of a woman, and one count of conspiring to do the same, offences prohibited in the Victorian Crimes Act 1958. When Justice Menhennitt gave this ruling, the trial had been going for eight days. The prosecution was about to call expert medical testimony, and Menhennitt anticipated that the admissibility of that evidence might be challenged, so he decided to rule on certain questions of law in advance.

The relevant section of the Crimes Act, section 65, stated that:

Whosoever... with intent to procure the miscarriage of any woman whether she is or is not with child unlawfully administers to her or causes to be taken by her any poison or other noxious thing, or unlawfully uses any instrument or other means with the like intent, shall be guilty of a felony, and shall be liable to imprisonment for a term of not more than fifteen years.

As of March 2006, the only subsequent change to this law is in the classification of the crime, from felony to indictable offence. The remainder of the wording remains the same. Menhennitt discussed the background of the section, saying that it was drawn from an 1861 English law, the Offences against the Person Act 1861, which in turn derived from English laws from 1837, 1828 and 1803.

== Arguments ==
The main issue to be considered was what the word "unlawfully" meant in this context. Justice Menhennitt noted that the inclusion of the word implied that some abortions might be lawful. The word "unlawfully" had also appeared in the earlier English legislation from which the Victorian law had derived, and the same word was also used in earlier common law indictments. The word was not defined in any of those statutes, although in the United Kingdom the Abortion Act 1967 had been passed in the meantime, which provided a definition of when abortions were lawful. That legislation had no equivalent in Victoria however, and "unlawfully" remained undefined.

=== English precedent ===
The only case that had specifically considered what "unlawfully" meant in the context of abortion was a 1938 English case heard in the Courts of Assize, Rex v Bourne. In that case, Dr Bourne was charged with the crime of abortion under section 58 of the Offences Against The Person Act 1861 (the same section on which the Victorian law drew). During his summing up, the trial judge instructed the jury that "no person ought to be convicted [of the crime of abortion] unless the jury are satisfied the act was not done in good faith for the purpose only of preserving the life of the mother." The trial judge said that first this was the appropriate definition of abortion at common law, and secondly that although particular wording did not appear in the definition of the crime of abortion, it did appear in the definition of the crime of child destruction (which applies when a person kills a child during childbirth), and that the word "unlawfully" in the definition of abortion implied that the wording should also apply to abortion.

The trial judge continued, saying:

I think those words ought to be construed in a reasonable sense, and, if the doctor is of opinion, on reasonable grounds and with adequate knowledge, that the probable consequence of the continuance of the pregnancy will be to make the woman a physical or mental wreck, the jury are quite entitled to take the view that the doctor who, under those circumstances and in that honest belief, operates, is operating for the purpose of preserving the life of the mother.

Justice Menhennitt described why the proviso from the definition of child destruction in the English legislation should also apply to the definition of abortion, by pointing out that under another provision of the same law, abortion was an alternative charge to child destruction and vice versa (that is, the jury could choose to substitute one charge for the other). As such, there was a strong argument to say that the same proviso should apply to both.

However, as Justice Menhennitt pointed out, the Victorian definition of child destruction (in section 10 of the Crimes Act) does not include the proviso in the English legislation; instead, it simply says "unlawfully". As such, that argument would not apply in Victoria, and "what is lawful and what is unlawful must be determined by other legal principles."

=== Necessity ===
Justice Menhennitt then considered a discussion of R v Bourne by Glanville Williams, in his book The Sanctity of Life and the Criminal Law, in which Williams said:

The judge's direction to the jury, which resulted in Mr. Bourne's acquittal, is a striking vindication of the legal view that the defence of necessity applies not only to common law but even to statutory crimes. It is true that the direction proceeded in some slight degree on the analogy of the child destruction statute, which contains an express exemption for the preservation of the life of the mother; but the exception in the one statute was not in itself a ground for reading a similar exception into the other.

On this basis, although there were differences in the Victorian legislation, the definition in R v Bourne of "unlawfully" in the context of abortion could indeed be useful in Victoria, if recognised as an expression of the common law defence of necessity.

Justice Menhennitt discussed various definitions of necessity, noting that the concepts of necessity and proportion are usually present. He also quoted a test for necessity laid down by a previous decision of the Supreme Court of Victoria in R v MacKay, a case about the killing of an escaping prisoner:

...the test laid down by the law today for determining whether the homicide is justifiable or not is a twofold test which may be stated in this form: (1) Did the accused honestly believe on reasonable grounds that it was necessary to do what he did in order to prevent the completion of the felony or the escape of the felon? and (2) Would a reasonable man in his position have considered that what he did was not out of proportion to the mischief to be prevented?

In the context of abortion under Victorian law, this principle of necessity would mean that anyone performing a termination would have to have an honest and reasonable belief that conducting the termination was necessary to prevent some serious harm from occurring to the woman. Thus the test would be a subjective one, with the requirement that the beliefs be held reasonably.

== Judgment ==
Justice Menhennitt decided in favour of using the principle of necessity to give substance to "unlawfulness" in this context. He expressed a test for deciding whether a termination would be unlawful or not in this way:

For the use of an instrument with intent to procure a miscarriage to be lawful the accused must have honestly believed on reasonable grounds that the act done by him was (a) necessary to preserve the woman from a serious danger to her life or her physical or mental health (not being merely the normal dangers of pregnancy and childbirth) which the continuance of the pregnancy would entail; and (b) in the circumstances not out of proportion to the danger to be averted.

== Consequences ==
The trial proceeded, and Davidson was found not guilty by the jury on all five charges, on 3 June 1969.

The primary significance of the decision was that it referred to both physical and mental health of the mother as a factor in a lawful abortion.

The principles in the ruling were largely adopted in the state of New South Wales by the District Court of New South Wales in 1971 in the case of R v Wald, which also involved the prosecution of a doctor for performing a termination. That case expanded the definition slightly, by pointing out that "it would be for the jury to decide whether there existed in the case of each woman any economic, social or medical ground or reason which in their view could constitute reasonable grounds upon which an accused could honestly and reasonably believe there would result a serious danger to her physical or mental health". In the state of Queensland, the principles in the Menhennitt ruling were cited in the 1986 case of R v Bayliss & Cullen. In the other states, and in the Northern Territory (but not the Australian Capital Territory), legislation has been adopted to define which abortions are legal and which are not.

In 1974, the Whitlam government provided that Medibank (now called Medicare) benefits could be paid to women who underwent a termination procedure. In 1979, however, there was a motion in the Australian House of Representatives from Stephen Lusher to end medical benefits for terminations, and the debate spilled over to the legality of abortion. Although the decisions in Davidson and Wald were fiercely criticised by some members of parliament, who insisted that abortion was still illegal, others defended the validity of the decisions. Former Prime Minister Billy McMahon said "it has been stated rather foolishly, by a member not very closely attuned to the law – that there has been no appeals. But there could have been an appeal. There was no restriction in either State, Liberal Country Party or Labor government as to appeal."

Despite some disquiet from the anti-abortion lobby, no appeals have been lodged against the Menhennitt ruling or the other decisions, and in most states there have been no successful prosecutions for consensual abortion since those decisions. Anti-abortion writers contend that most abortions remain illegal, and that the courts and the prosecutors are lax in protecting the rights of unborn children. Other commentators argue that calling abortion technically illegal is incorrect, or otherwise pointless, since that is "a meaningless category in law."

In 2008, after a conscience vote in the Victorian parliament, legislation reforming abortion laws was passed. The new law legalizes abortion on request up to 24 weeks pregnancy; after that time, two doctors must certify that they "reasonably believe that the abortion is appropriate in all the circumstances", with those circumstances encompassing "all relevant medical circumstances; and the woman's current and future physical, psychological and social circumstances."

== See also ==
- Abortion in Australia
- Australian criminal law
