= Abortion in Australia =

Colour-coded map illustrating accessibility of abortion in Australia, in weeks of embryonic age (from fertilization). Beyond the limits it is legal with two doctors' approval. Available first 16 weeks (4 months) Available first 22 weeks (5 months) Available first 23 weeks (5.5 months) Available first 24 weeks (5.5 months) Legal at any stage if provided by medical doctor.

Abortion in Australia is legal. There are no federal abortion laws, though decriminalisation of the procedure has been enacted in all jurisdictions. Access to abortion varies between the states and territories: Surgical abortions are readily available on request within the first 22 to 24 weeks of pregnancy in most jurisdictions, and up to 16 weeks in Tasmania. Later-term abortions can be obtained with the approval of two doctors, although the Australian Capital Territory only requires a single physician's approval.

Since at least the 1980s, opinion polls have shown a majority of Australians support abortion rights, and that support for abortion rights is increasing. While anti-abortion violence is rare in Australia, anti-abortion activists have used tactics including "verbal abuse, threats, and impeding entry" outside abortion clinics. In response, all jurisdictions have enacted laws prohibiting protesters from harassing visitors and staff within a certain radius of abortion clinics, starting with Tasmania in 2013 and lastly with Western Australia in 2021.

A woman's sexual partner is not required to be notified of an abortion, and Australian courts will not grant injunctions to prevent the procedure, even if the applicant is the putative father of the foetus. No waiting periods are imposed on having an abortion. A minor does not need to notify a parent of a proposed abortion, nor is parental consent required. While abortions are regulated by the states and territories, the procedure is partially funded under the federal government public health scheme, Medicare, or by private healthcare insurers.

== History ==
Since colonisation, abortion in Australia has always been regulated by state (previously colonial) law. Before the end of the 19th century, each colony had adopted the Imperial Offences Against the Person Act 1861, which, in turn, was derived from English laws from 1837, 1828, and 1803, which made abortion illegal under any circumstance. Since then, abortion law has continued to evolve in each state by case law and changes in legislation.

A legal precedent concerning the legality of abortion was set in Australia in 1969, by the Menhennitt ruling in the Victorian Supreme Court case R v Davidson, which held that abortion was lawfully justified if "necessary to preserve the physical or mental health of the woman concerned, provided that the danger involved in the abortion did not outweigh the danger which the abortion was designed to prevent". Since then, court rulings and legislative reform have helped deliver a medical framework for abortion in Australia; the Menhennitt ruling was later largely adopted by courts in New South Wales and Queensland, and was influential in some other states. Over time, this has come to be broadly defined so as to include the mental health of the woman, to which unwanted pregnancy is interpreted as clinically injurious.

Abortion rights received more attention over the 1970s across Australia, due, in part, to the efforts of many organisations and individuals such as the Abortion Law Reform Association (ALRA), Control Abortion Referral Service, and government initiatives such as the Royal Commission on Human Relationships, and activist medical practitioners such as Bertram Wainer.

=== RU-486 controversy ===
In the mid-1990s, the conservative Howard government was in power in Australia, with conservative independent Tasmanian Senator Brian Harradine holding the balance of power in the Senate. Howard brokered a deal with Harradine to ensure his support for proposed bills, including the privatisation of national telecommunications provider Telecom. In return, Harradine received support for introducing restrictions on abortion. As a result, unlike other medications, abortifacient drugs were made to require approval from the Minister for Health before they could be assessed by the Therapeutic Goods Administration (TGA). As TGA assessment is a requirement for drugs to be sold in Australia, this created a ministerial veto. Accordingly, the abortifacient RU-486, which was widely used overseas, was banned in Australia. The continued refusal by Tony Abbott, then Minister for Health, to allow abortifacients into Australia led to a private member's bill being introduced in late 2005 to transfer the approval back to the TGA. The bill was subsequently passed as the Therapeutic Goods Amendment (Repeal of Ministerial responsibility for approval of RU486) Act 2006. From 2006 to 2012, the drug was still not registered by the TGA, and medical practitioners needed special status from the TGA in order to prescribe it; even after registration, its use still has special conditions and restrictions. There is opinion among medical experts in Australia that abortifacients are over-regulated.

In 2006, after losing his veto power over abortifacients, Tony Abbott lobbied for funding of alternative counseling to pregnant women through church-affiliated groups to lower the national abortion rate, without success. In 2010, however, while he was seeking election as Liberal Party leader, Abbott pledged not to make any changes to abortion laws.

=== Contemporary debate ===
In 2017, Senator Cory Bernardi moved a motion to ban sex-selective abortion. The motion was voted down (10–36). There is no evidence that sex-selective abortions are common in Australia, though according to the Human Rights Law Centre, attempting to create bans on the procedure is a "well-known tactic of opponents of abortion to limit women's access to abortion".

The National Women's Health Strategy 2020–2030, published by the Department of Health in 2019, listed "equitable access to pregnancy termination services" as a key measure of success for maternal, sexual and reproductive health.

Before the 2019 federal election, the Australian Labor Party unveiled a national abortion policy for the 2019 Australian federal election. The party's policy included requiring public hospitals to offer abortion procedures consistently under new Commonwealth funding agreements, encouraging New South Wales to remove abortion from its criminal laws and building an abortion clinic in Tasmania. In response Liberal Party leader Scott Morrison stated the issue was controversial and sensitive and decisions should be left to the states. His Coalition colleagues were largely quiet on the matter, while anti-abortion groups including the Australian Christian Lobby and Cherish Life campaigned against Labor on the issue. Cherish Life claimed that Labor had an "extreme late-term abortion agenda", and that "more babies would die" if they were elected. Labor MP Ed Husic, who retained his seat at the election, said the misrepresentation of the party's abortion policy was a factor in his decrease in votes.

In October 2024, the South Australian Legislative Council narrowly voted down 10 to 9, a bill that would have seen those seeking a termination after 28 weeks to instead undergo an induced birth, with the babies then being adopted – effectively banning abortion at 28 weeks.

A 2025 study of registered births in Western Australia and New South Wales found male-to-female sex ratio at birth evidence of sex-selective abortion for birth mothers born in certain countries such as China and India. The study's authors strongly recommended that sex-determination technologies like NIPT [non-invasive prenatal testing] should not be used to reveal non-medical traits of the fetus, including sex.

=== Anti-abortion violence and protests ===
Anti-abortion violence is rare in Australia. The first serious attack and murder by an anti-abortion activist occurred in 2001, carried out by Peter Knight. Knight walked into a Melbourne clinic carrying a rifle, kerosene, and equipment to lock the doors of the clinic. He was intending to murder all patients and staff in the building, though he was overpowered after shooting and killing a security guard. Anti-abortion activists had been protesting outside the clinic, though left 15 minutes before Knight's attack. Knight, described by the prosecution as a "hermit obsessed with killing abortion doctors", was convicted of murder and sentenced to life imprisonment. In January 2009, a firebombing using Molotov cocktails was attempted at a medical clinic in Mosman Park, Western Australia. Damage was minimal, and only resulted in smashed windows and blackened external walls. Police believed graffiti saying "baby killers" on the building was related to the attack; however, the medical clinic did not actually offer abortion services.

Since at least the 1990s, tactics used by anti-abortion campaigners outside abortion clinics included "verbal abuse, threats, impeding entry to clinics, displaying violent imagery, and acts of 'disturbing theater' such as pushing a blood-splattered doll in a pram". In response, states and territories began creating "safe access zones", which prevent protesting about abortion within a proscribed area surrounding a clinic. Tasmania was the first state to do so in 2013. In April 2019, the High Court of Australia upheld these laws after they were challenged by two people arrested for violating them. The petitioners claimed their right to freedom of political communication had been denied as a result of the laws, though the court dismissed the appeals, saying the laws served a legitimate purpose. In August 2021, Western Australia became the last state to introduce safe access zones. In the months prior, patients at abortion clinics in that state were continuing to be approached and intimidated by protesters; footage was also obtained of anti-abortion protesters outside a Western Australian clinic at the height of the COVID-19 pandemic, despite social distancing guidelines at the time. All jurisdictions have their exclusion zone at 150m around abortion clinics at all times, except for the Australian Capital Territory which may set a zone of 50m with approval from a health minister.

== Abortion laws ==
=== Federal involvement ===
Abortions are partially funded under Medicare, the federal government-funded public health scheme. As of 2015, Medicare effectively halved the cost of surgical abortion, and those provided by private healthcare insurers, which are also regulated by the federal government. The federal government also provides funding to public hospitals, and can thereby influence abortion policy and practice. Abortions and abortion advice are regarded as health services, and are exempt from the Goods and Services Tax (GST).

=== Summary of state laws ===
State or territory	Status	Details
Australian Capital Territory (Note: Also applies to Jervis Bay Territory.)	Yes Legal, free, and accessible (no gestational limit).	Must be provided by medical doctor. Health Minister may set 50 metre exclusion zones for protests.
New South Wales (Note: Most laws of New South Wales and Queensland, including their abortion laws, are set to apply to Norfolk Island after 2026. The Criminal Code of Norfolk Island, which remains in force in the territory, does not prohibit abortion.)	Yes Legal. Accessible up to 22 weeks. (5 months)	Beyond 22 weeks legal with two doctors' approval. Safe access zones are set at 150 metres around abortion clinics.
Northern Territory	Yes Legal. Accessible up to 24 weeks. (5.5 months)	Beyond 24 weeks legal with two doctors' approval. Safe access zones of 150 metres provided around abortion clinics.
Queensland	Yes Legal. Accessible up to 22 weeks. (5 months)	Beyond 22 weeks legal with two doctors' approval. Safe access zones of 150 metres are provided around abortion clinics.
South Australia	Yes Legal. Accessible up to 22 weeks and 6 days. (5 months)	Beyond 22 weeks and 6 days legal with two doctors' approval. Safe access zones of 150 metres provided around abortion clinics.
Tasmania	Yes Legal. Accessible up to 16 weeks. (4 months)	Beyond 16 weeks legal with two doctors' approval. Safe access zones of 150 metres provided around abortion clinics.
Victoria	Yes Legal. Accessible up to 24 weeks. (5.5 months)	Beyond 24 weeks legal with two doctors' approval. Safe access zones of 150 metres provided around abortion clinics.
Western Australia (Note: Also applies to Christmas Island and the Cocos (Keeling) Islands.)	Yes Legal. Accessible up to 23 weeks. (5.5 months)	Beyond 23 weeks legal with two doctors' approval. Safe access zones of 150 metres provided around abortion clinics.

=== Australian Capital Territory ===
In the Australian Capital Territory (ACT), references to abortion as a criminal offence were repealed by the Crimes (Abolition of Offence of Abortion) Act 2002. Before then, abortion law was for many years governed by case law under sections 82–84 of the Crimes Act 1900 of New South Wales. Abortion care is now regulated under the framework of health law, standards, policies, and professional ethics that apply to all healthcare. There is no gestational limit preventing an abortion in the ACT.

Since March 2016, it has been an offence to protest within 50 m of an abortion clinic within the Australian Capital Territory (otherwise called "protest free zones").

Since April 2023, abortion is free or at no cost for official Australian Capital Territory residents, a legal first for an Australian jurisdiction.

In June 2024, a bill passed in the ACT Assembly increasing abortion services by allowing nurses and midwives to prescribe abortion medication for the first time, in addition to doctors. The bill also introduced a requirement for health practitioners who refuse to provide abortion services to either refer patients to a practitioner that provides those services, or information on how to find one, bringing the ACT "into line with other states and territories" which had already required this.

=== New South Wales ===
Abortion was decriminalised in New South Wales on 2 October 2019 with the royal assent of the Abortion Law Reform Act 2019, passed a week earlier by both houses of the New South Wales parliament. The legislation took abortion out of the 119-year-old criminal code, and regulates it as a medical procedure. Under the new law, abortions are made available on request during the first 22 weeks of gestation. After that time, two doctors must agree that it is appropriate, based on the woman's current and future physical, psychological, and social circumstances. This is similar to laws in other states and territories. The medical practitioner performing the abortion has an obligation to give appropriate medical care if the abortion results in a live baby being born.

Prior to the new law, abortion had been explicitly listed in New South Wales as a crime under sections 82–84 of the Crimes Act 1900 (NSW) since 1900, but the interpretation of the law is subject to the Levine ruling, from R v Wald of 1971, (Note: R v Wald (1971) 3 NSW DCR 25. Confirmed in CES v Superclinics Australia Pty Ltd.) itself derived from the Victorian Menhennitt ruling, which held an abortion to be legal if a doctor had an honest and reasonable belief that, due to "any economic, social, or medical ground or reason", the abortion was necessary to "preserve the woman involved from serious danger to her life or physical or mental health which the continuance of the pregnancy would entail". This was expanded by CES v Superclinics Australia Pty Ltd (1995), which extended the period during which health concerns might be considered from the duration of pregnancy to include the woman's future health and well-being. In 2006, Dr. Suman Sood was convicted of two counts of performing an illegal abortion where she failed to enquire as to whether a lawful reason for performing the abortion did exist.

In June 2016, Greens upper house MP Mehreen Faruqi was to introduce a bill decriminalising abortion in NSW. However, on the eve of the introduction of the bill on 23 June 2016, it was removed from the order of business for the following day, despite being first in the order of precedence for months, scheduled and publicly announced.

In August 2016, Mehreen Faruqi released an exposure draft of the Abortion Law Reform (Miscellaneous Acts Amendment) Bill 2016 to "Repeal sections 82–84 of the Crimes Act, relating to abortion offences; Provide for a 150 metre safe access zone around abortion clinics and service providers to ensure a patient's right to medical privacy; and Require doctors to disclose conscientious objection at the start of the consultation and refer patients to another doctor who does not have such an objection or to the local Women's Health NSW centre". The bill was introduced to the upper house on 11 August 2016. It was defeated in the second reading 25–14 on 11 May 2017.

Since 1 July 2018, it has been illegal to protest within 150 metres of an abortion clinic.

In October 2025, John Ruddick MLC introduced a Bill for an Act to prohibit the performance of terminations for the purposes of sex selection. The Bill was defeated in the Legislative Council by 21 to 16 votes.

=== Northern Territory ===
In the Northern Territory, abortion requires the approval of two doctors after 24 weeks' gestation. Surgical and medical abortion are available in the public health system. This is unusual in Australia where abortion services are frequently outsourced to private providers.

The Termination of Pregnancy Law Reform Act was enacted on 1 July 2017 and removed the need for two doctors to examine a woman before 14 weeks gestation, implemented a 150-metre "safe access zone" around clinics, removed the requirement of parental approval for the procedure and provided the ability for the prescription of medical abortion tablets. The Interpretive Report 2018 recorded 742 abortions in the previous 12 months with 73% being medical abortion with tablets before 9 weeks gestation, the remaining 27% were conducted in hospital. Since the legislative change, 99.33% of terminations of pregnancy were conducted under 14 weeks of gestation. This has also meant that the waiting time in a public hospital for a surgical termination has reduced which has policy and public health economic implications.

In December 2021, the Northern Territory eased restrictions on abortions, allowing access between 14 and 24 weeks with the approval of one doctor instead of the previous two required. They also legalised terminations after 24 weeks with the approval of two doctors, removing the previous provision which stated abortions were only legal after 24 weeks to save a woman's life.

=== Queensland ===
Since 3 December 2018, abortion in Queensland has been available on request during the first 22 weeks of gestation. After that period, two doctors must sign off on the procedure before a woman can access an abortion unless there is a danger to the life of the woman or, in a multiple pregnancy, another foetus. Changes in the law followed campaigning by groups such as Fair Agenda who helped coordinate the lobbying of politicians, including via a rally and the use of a 'vote pro choice' web tool which showed politician's positions on the issue and enabled messages to be sent to them. Following the success of the campaign Fair Agenda and others used similar tactics to gain reform in New South Wales and South Australia.

Prior to December 2018, abortion access in Queensland was determined by the 1986 McGuire ruling, which declared abortion to be legal if necessary to preserve the woman from a serious danger to her life or health—beyond the normal dangers of pregnancy and childbirth—that would result if the pregnancy continued, and is not disproportionate to the danger being averted. Until 2008, abortion law in Queensland closely mirrored the law in Victoria. The McGuire ruling was affirmed in the 1994 case Veivers v. Connolly, by a single judge of the Supreme Court of Queensland.

In 2024, LNP Premier David Crisafulli banned discussions and debate on abortion for four years in parliament, in what was described as an unorthodox method of fulfilling his campaign promise to not change abortion laws if elected.

=== South Australia ===
In South Australia, South Australian residents up to 23 weeks pregnant can have an early medication or surgical abortion. Safe access zones of 150 metres are provided around abortion clinics, effective since 1 January 2021.

Legislation in 1969 legalised abortion when necessary to protect the life or physical or mental health of the woman — taking into account the current and reasonably foreseeable future — or in cases when the child was likely to be born with serious handicaps. Abortions must be performed before a time limit of 28 weeks of pregnancy. Abortions must be performed in a hospital, and be approved by two physicians, and are also subject to a residency requirement (patient must be a resident of South Australia for at least two months). The hospital, dual approval, and residency requirement may be waived in an emergency. Abortions in South Australia are available for free or low cost at some of the public health facilities, including The Pregnancy Advisory Centre. This Pregnancy Advisory Centre is a registered hospital, with doctors available for approval. Both medical and surgical abortions are performed.

A bill decriminalising abortion was introduced into the state parliament in October 2020. Under the legislation, abortion can be performed upon request up to 22 weeks and six days gestation. After that period, a medical practitioner can only perform an abortion if they consult with another practitioner, and if both are of the view that the procedure is medically appropriate. The reform removed abortion entirely from the criminal code. The Legislative Council passed the bill on 3 December 2020, as did the House of Assembly on 19 February 2021, by 29 votes to 15. As an amendment banning so-called "gender-selective abortion" was passed by the Assembly, the amendments were agreed to by the Legislative Council on 2 March 2021, and received royal assent on 11 March 2021. The legislation required further regulations to be issued by the government, in order to come into effect. The government published the regulations on 23 June 2022; they came into effect on 7 July 2022. Health Minister Chris Picton criticised the former Liberal government, which was defeated by Labor at the March 2022 state election, for "delay[ing] and bury[ing] these regulations, and failed to explain to the community why they did not progress them".

In October 2024, the South Australian Legislative Council narrowly voted down 10 to 9, a bill that would have seen those seeking a termination after 28 weeks to instead undergo an induced birth, with the babies then being adopted – effectively banning abortion at 28 weeks.

Former One Nation MLC Sarah Game has on several occasions sought to restrict access to abortion. She introduced legislation in September 2025 to prohibit abortions after 23 weeks except in instances where "the continuance of the pregnancy would involve significant risk of injury to the physical or mental health of the pregnant person'. The bill was voted down in the Legislative Council by 11 votes to 8 on 12 November 2025. In May 2026 she oversaw a bill to prohibit a medical practitioner performing a termination on a person who is more than 24 weeks and 6 days pregnant in circumstances other than where the medical practitioner considers that "the termination is necessary to save the life of the pregnant person". The bill narrowly passed the upper house by 10 votes to 9 on 17 June 2026, but was defeated 9–36 in the lower house on the same day.

=== Tasmania ===
In Tasmania, since 21 November 2013, abortions are allowed on request up to 16 weeks of pregnancy. After 16 weeks abortion requires the consent of two doctors on medical or psychological grounds. The law also prohibits filming, the holding of protests, harassment, or intimidation of patients or staff within 150 metres of abortion clinics.

From 1925 until 2001, Tasmania's Criminal Code prohibited "unlawful abortion", without actually stating what was lawful or not. While it had never actually been prosecuted, it had been held that Victoria's Menhennitt ruling of 1969 and New South Wales' Levine ruling applied in Tasmanian law. In late 2001, the Criminal Code was clarified to state that an abortion must be carried out under a set of criteria resembling those of the South Australian requirements.

The availability of abortion facilities in the state is limited. The state's public health system provides abortion services in only extraordinary circumstances (e. g., in cases of foetal abnormality); so, most women access pregnancy terminations through the private sector. In 2017, the state's only dedicated low-cost surgical abortion clinic closed. Some women chose to fly interstate for pregnancy terminations.

=== Victoria ===
In Victoria, since 2008, abortions are allowed on request up to 24 weeks of pregnancy, with abortions after that time requiring two doctors to agree that it is appropriate, based on the woman's current and future physical, psychological, and social circumstances.

Before 2008, abortion law was based on the Victorian Crimes Act, as interpreted by the Menhennitt ruling in 1969, in the case of R v Davidson. Under the ruling, abortions were only legal if necessary to preserve the woman from a serious danger to her life or health — beyond the normal dangers of pregnancy and childbirth — that would result if the pregnancy continued, and is not disproportionate to the danger being averted. Menhennitt's ruling remained the basis for abortion law in Victoria until the Abortion Law Reform Act 2008 (Vic) decriminalised abortions up to a gestational limit of 24 weeks.

=== Western Australia ===
In Western Australia, from May 1998, abortions became legal on request (with a referral from a doctor) up to 20 weeks of pregnancy, though subject to counselling by a medical practitioner other than the one performing the abortion. After 20 weeks of pregnancy, abortions were only able to be performed if the foetus was likely to be born with severe medical problems, which needed to be confirmed by two independently appointed doctors. For girls under 16 years of age, one parent needed to be notified, except where permission has been granted by the Children's Court or when the child did not live with her parents.

In September 2023, progressive abortion reforms were made under the Abortion Legislation Reform Act, which included fully removing abortion from the criminal code, removing the need for parental notification for minors, and reducing the number of doctors needed to approve most abortions from two to one. The need for mandatory counselling was also removed, and the time at which additional requirements for abortion apply was increased from 20 weeks gestation to 23 weeks. The changes came into effect on 27 March 2024.

Western Australia was the last jurisdiction in Australia not to have safe access zones. A bill to create safe zones within 150 metres of abortion clinics was formally passed in August 2021, and went into legal effect from 1 September on assent. A 2020 report by the Western Australian Department of Health found that 70% of people approved of safe access zones.

== Access to services ==
In November 2024, it was revealed that several hospitals within NSW rural communities were explicitly denying women access to abortion by way of a "self imposed regulation", forcing women to travel hours to either Sydney or Canberra to access abortion.

=== Telehealth services ===
With advancements in technology and the need for accessible healthcare services, telehealth has become a pivotal mode for providing abortion services across Australia. This approach allows women in remote, rural, and urban areas to access safe and legal abortion services, without the need for physical attendance in a healthcare facility.

== "Child destruction" laws ==
Each state and territory has its own criminal code relating to child destruction. The offence is called "killing unborn child", and can be committed only around the time of childbirth in Queensland, Western Australia, and the Northern Territory. It is called "causing death of child before birth" in Tasmania. As of 2008, in South Australia, "child destruction" came under the heading of "abortion". The definition is somewhat broader in the Australian Capital Territory, and comparably broad to English law in Tasmania and South Australia. The offence was abolished in Victoria by the Abortion Law Reform Act 2008.

New South Wales does not have a "child destruction" enactment, but the Crimes Amendment (Grievous Bodily Harm) Act 2005 (NSW) amended the Crimes Act 1900 (NSW), so that s 4(1)(a) now defines "grievous bodily harm" as including "the destruction (other than in the course of a medical procedure) of the foetus of a pregnant woman, whether or not the woman suffers any other harm". This was further amended by the Abortion Law Reform Act 2019 to "the destruction (other than in the course of a medical procedure or a termination of a pregnancy in accordance with the Abortion Law Reform Act 2019) of the foetus of a pregnant woman, whether or not the woman suffers any other harm". In March 2022, NSW enacted "Zoe's Law", which created a new criminal offence for people who cause the loss of a foetus through a criminal act such as assault. The law explicitly states the new crime does not apply to abortion, or anything a woman does that results in the loss of her own foetus.

== Statistics ==
There is a lack of consistent data collection standards across states due to differences in definitions, making it difficult or impossible to accurately quantify the number of abortions performed in Australia each year. There were an average of 75,700 Medicare-funded procedures that could result in an "abortive outcome" performed each year from 1995 to 2004, but this figure includes miscarriages as well as terminations. On the other hand, many women who have medical abortions performed at private hospitals may not claim the Medicare rebate.

South Australia is the only state which collects and publishes data on abortions. In 2002 there were 5147 medical abortions performed in South Australia, or 17.2 per 1000 women aged 15–44. Projected nationally, this would suggest that about 73,300 abortions were performed nationwide. This does not take into account differences between states. For example, unpublished data from Western Australia estimates a rate of 19.4 terminations per 1000 women in the same age bracket, which would indicate about 82,700 abortions projected nationally. The South Australian data also indicates that the vast majority of abortions performed between 1994 and 2002 occurred before 14 weeks gestation. Less than 2% took place at or after 20 weeks.

== Public opinion ==
Traditional Christian beliefs played a large factor influencing Australia's initial policies opposing abortion. Changing attitudes to abortion and reproductive rights have correlated with fewer Australians perceiving their country to be a "Christian nation", which, in turn, has decreased the influence of right-wing Christian politicians. Stigma surrounding the issue of abortion, however, still remains, and can severely impact women's sense of identity and mental health, and also influence whether an abortion is obtained. Women may choose to state they suffered a miscarriage, rather than telling people they had an abortion, to avoid negative reactions.

Since at least the 1980s, opinion polls have shown a majority of Australians support abortion rights, and that support for abortion rights is increasing.

- In 1973, the Women's Electoral Lobby polled 5,267 men and women in Sydney, Melbourne, Adelaide, and Canberra. The survey found 80% of people believed a woman should have a right to have an abortion.
- In 1987, a Saulwick poll found only about 7% of Australians would not approve of abortions under any circumstances.
- In 2003, a poll by The Australian Survey of Social Attitudes (AuSSA) found that 81% of Australians believe a woman should have the right to choose an abortion, and only 9% believe they should not; 7% were "neutral", and 2% could not decide.
- In 2005, a Nielsen Corporation poll found that 56% of Australians thought the abortion laws in place, which generally allow abortion for the sake of life, health, or economic factors, were "about right", 16% want changes in law, to make abortion "more accessible", and 17% want changes to make it "less accessible".
- In 2006, a poll by Roy Morgan Research found that 65% of Australians approved of surgical abortion, and 22% disapproved; and that 62% believed RU-486 should be available to women, while 31% believed it should not.
- In 2006, interviews found that 80% of Australians disapproved the use of sex-selective abortion.
- In 2007, a poll by AuSSA found that 4% of Australians are opposed to abortion in all circumstances, 33% believe abortion should be allowed in certain circumstances, and 57% believed it should be readily available whenever a woman wants one; 7% were undecided, or did not respond.
- In 2009, a study of polls conducted during Australia's 2007 federal elections found that a clear majority of both Labor Party and Liberal Party voters support abortion rights. The study also showed that 77 per cent of winning candidates in the 2007 election favoured an unrestricted approach to abortion.
- In 2010, a study published in The Medical Journal of Australia found that 61% of Australians said abortion should be lawful without question in the first trimester of pregnancy, while 26% said it should be lawful depending on the reason. In the second trimester and third trimesters, support for outright lawful abortion was 12% and 6%, respectively, while 57% and 42%, respectively, said it depended on the circumstances.
- In 2023, an Ipsos survey of Australians aged 16–74 found that 70% think abortion should be legal for any woman in the first 6 weeks of a pregnancy (down from 74% in 2022), 54% think abortion should be legal for any woman in the first 14 weeks of a pregnancy (down from 59% in 2022) and 31% think abortion should be legal for any woman in the first 20 weeks of a pregnancy (down from 39% in 2022).
- In 2026, a poll undertaken by Redbridge, on behalf of The Australia Institute, found that 62% of Australian voters support access to abortion, 25% support access to abortion only in limited circumstances, and 8% do not support access to abortion.

=== Indigenous perceptions ===
When abortion began to be legislated in 1969, some Indigenous Australians were among those opposing it, on the belief it would lead to "coerced abortion and sterilization". This attitude is believed to have been influenced by previous government interference in Indigenous autonomy, including the Stolen Generations. As of the mid-2010s, more Indigenous women were choosing to have abortions, though stigmatisation around the issue is still prominent within many Indigenous communities.
