= Battle of Surabaya (film) =

November 10th
- Battle of Surabaya
- Directed by: Aryanto Yuniawan
- Written by: M. Suyanto; Aryanto Yuniawan
- Produced by: M. Suyanto; Aryanto Yuniawan
- Starring: Reza Rahadian; Keagan Kang; Maudy Ayunda; Marlon Dance-Hooi; Joe Murray; Alistair Hendry
- Production companies: MSV Studio; STMIK Amikom
- Distributed by: Fantastic Films International (International); Walt Disney Studios Motion Pictures (Asia, except India); GKIDS (United States)
- Release date: 20 August 2015
- Running time: 99 minutes
- Country: Indonesia
- Languages: Indonesian; English; Japanese
- Budget: IDR 15 billion (US$1 million)

November 10 (titled Battle of Surabaya in Indonesia) is a 2015 anime-influenced Indonesian animated war drama film, produced by MSV Pictures. It is directed by Aryanto Yuniawan and produced by M. Suyanto. It won Most People's Choice Award in the International Movie Trailer Festival (IMTF).

== Plot ==
The film opens with the atomic bombings of Hiroshima and Nagasaki, followed by Japan's surrender to the Allied powers aboard the USS Missouri. Though Indonesian President Sukarno proclaimed Indonesian independence, the Dutch wanted to restore control over the Dutch East Indies, resulting in the Indonesian National Revolution. With the Dutch lacking the manpower to reoccupy their former colony, British and Indian forces land in Java including Surabaya to restore order on behalf of the Dutch.

Prior to the Battle of Surabaya, thirteen-year old Musa works as a shoe shiner to support his ill mother. Having lost his father, Musa finds a father figure in an Imperial Japanese Army captain named Yoshimura, who is later killed in a fight between Indonesian youths and KNIL soldiers. Musa befriends an adolescent Indonesian Chinese girl named Yumna, an orphan who works as a spy for the Indonesian nationalists and is a former member of the secretive Kipas Hitam (Black Fan) militia group. In addition, Musa also befriends an older youth named Danu and an Indonesian soldier named Solehudin(whom everybody called Cuk Soleh).

To help the Indonesian struggle, Musa and Yumna work as couriers for Resident Sudirman, traveling behind Allied and Japanese lines. Musa initially considers quitting his work as a courier but changes his mind after his mother is killed in a fire, leaving him orphaned. In her final moments, she tells her son that there is no glory in war. As the Indonesian Republic negotiates with the British under Brigadier A.W.S. Mallaby, a new captain named John Wright arrives in Surabaya and takes increasingly active measures against the Indonesian nationalists and local supporters.

Based on information from his Kipas Hitam contacts, Captain Wright takes an interest in capturing Musa, who is couriering an encrypted instructions from the Indonesian political leadership to the military leaders organizing the resistance against the Allied forces. Following a lengthy pursuit, Musa is captured by the British and imprisoned at the Kipas Hitam base. Musa also learns that Danu is a traitor but resists Wright's interrogation. Wright reveals that his hatred for war stems from the loss of his son in the European Theater during World War II. Indonesian forces led by Solehudin and Yumna mount a rescue mission with the two being killed during the fighting. Changing sides, Danu rescues Musa and agrees to help him deliver the message to atone for his treason.

Following the assassination of Brigadier Mallaby, full-scale hostilities break out between Allied and Indonesian forces in Surabaya, devastating much of the city. During the fighting, Musa saves captain Wright from a snake. While couriering the coded message on a motorcycle sidecar, Musa and Danu are pursued by captain Wright and British forces. Danu gives his life to delay the pursuers by ramming his vehicle into a jeep. Commandeering a bicycle, Musa flees the British forces and manages to jump over a bridge. Out of respect for his foe, Wright allows Musa to escape.

Years later, an older Musa visits Japan and meets Captain Yoshimura's daughter Kioko. As the years pass, Musa becomes a grandfather. While attending a parade, he sees the faces of his fallen friends and imagines a world living in peace together.

== Cast ==
- Alistair Hendry as Musa, a thirteen year old boy who works as a shoe-shiner to support his ill mother in Surabaya. He becomes a courier for the Indonesian nationalists during the events leading up to the Battle of Surabaya.
  - Joe Murray as old Musa, Resident Soedirman, and parchment text.
  - Eileen Shannon as young Musa, a nurse, and Abdan.
- Maudy Ayunda (Angela Nazar in the English Dub) as Yumna, an Indonesian Chinese teenager whose hard life has made her a resolute and strong teenager. She crosses paths with Musa and the two become involved in the Indonesian National Revolution.
- Reza Rahadian (Keagan Kang in the English Dub) as Danu, a 26 year old man who came of age during World War Two. Despite making "wrong decisions," he joins the struggle for Indonesian independence.
- Novie Burhan (Sonja Bretschneider in the English Dub) as Aminah.
- Rafael as Dr Moestopo.
- Divian Nair as Solehudin.
- Marlon Dance-Hooi as Mr Sutomo.
- Jason Williams as Captain John Wright.
- Masuhiro Watanabe as Mr Yoshimura.
- Rafael as radio announcer, Governor Soerjo, and Governor's letter 3.
- Peter as Soemarsono.
- Vanhoebrouck Patrick Bernard as P.J.G. Huijer.
- Nathan as Brigadier Mallaby.
- Nobuyuki Suzuki as Kazuhiro, the Kipas Hitam leader.
- Alejandro as Mr Van Der Koch.
- Peter as Doel Arnowo.
- Sana Hamada as Kioko.
- Tanaka Hidetoshi as Admiral Shibata Yaichiro and Japanese soldier.
- Rasyad as Radjamin Nasution
- Daryl Wilson as English chief sergeant and an English soldier
- Vahoebrouck Patrick Bernard as Mr Ploegman.
- Rasyad as Ambonese man and Batak man.
- Peter as a Warrior and Warrior's letter 1.
- Aditya Kurniawan as Warrior's letter 2.
- Archival recordings of President Sukarno.
- MSV crew and Nobuyuki Suzuki as the Kipas Hitam crowd.

== Production ==
November 10th was jointly produced by MSV Pictures and Amikom Yogyakarta as a 2D animated film. Mohammad Suyanto and Aryanto Yuniawan wrote the script for the film in November 2012 with production beginning in early 2013. While developing the film, Suyanto and Yuniawan conducted research including visiting historical sites in Surabaya and interviewing veterans and eyewitnesses of the Battle of Surabaya. Suyanto, who also served as the film's producer, said that the film tells the story of how a thirteen year old shoeshiner named Musa becomes a courier for Indonesian freedom fighters during the Indonesian National Revolution. Suyanto said that the film's tagline "There is no glory in war" reflected its anti-war and humanist message. Fellow script writer Aryanto also stated that the film be a coming of age story focus on the protagonist's inner conflict and psychological journey.

While the November 10th was initially scheduled to be released in April 2014, the lengthy production process meant that the film took three years to produce at a cost of IDR 15 billion (US$1 million). The film's cast featured several Indonesian celebrities including Reza Rahadian and Maudy Ayunda. November 10th's soundtrack was sung by Angela Nazar, the third-placed winner of the 2013 X Factor Dutch. Walt Disney Asia-Pacific also advised the filmmakers during the production process, ensuring that the quality of the film and production was up to international standards.

== Release ==
By November 2013, the November 10th trailer had won several awards including the Ministry of Communication and Information Technology's 2012 INAICA award. The film's trailer was also screened at the International Movie Trailer Festival.

November 10th was released in Indonesia on 20 August 2015. Walt Disney Asia-Pacific expressed interest in distributing the film to a wider audience. In August 2015, Director Aryanto Yuniawan confirmed that MVS Pictures was in the process of dubbing voice roles in English and changing the soundtrack to English.

== Awards ==
- Best Animation, Hollywood International Motion Pictures Film Festival 2018
- Best Animation Film, European Cinematography Awards, 2018
- Best Animation, Amsterdam International Film Festival 2018
- Nominee Best Film, Amsterdam International Film Festival 2018
- Nominee Best Sound Design, Amsterdam International Film Festival 2018
- Best Animation, London, Gold Movie Awards 2018
- Best Animation, Oniros Film Awards 2018
- Outstanding Achievement Award - Animated Film, Calcutta International Cult Film Festival 2018.
- Best Animation Feature Film, Shouthern Cone International Film Festival 2018
- Best Animation, Festival International De Cine Del Cono Sur, 2018
- Best Animation, Venezuela, Ficocc Five Continents International Film Festival 2018
- Best Writer, Toronto, ATFF Spring Film Festival 2018
- Nominee Best Animation, London International Film Festival 2018
- Nominee Best Original Screenplay, of A Feature Film, London International Film Festival 2018
- Nominee Best Editing, of A Feature Film, London International Film Festival 2018
- Best Animation, Milan International Film Festival 2017
- Best Animation, Berlin International Film Festival 2017
- Best Animation, Nice International Film Festival 2017
- Gold Remi Award, Worldfest, Houston, International Film Festival 2016
- Grandprize Winner, SICAF 2016, The 20th Seoul International Cartoon & Animation Festival
- Winner Best Animation, 3rd Noida International Film Festival 2016
- Official Selection, Holland Animation Film Festival 2016
- Official Selection, Animation Dingle, Ireland 2016
- Special Screening, New Chitose Airport Animation Festival Japan, 2016
- Special Screening, Athens Animfest, Greece, 2016
- The Faces of Indonesia Cinema Today, 10th Jogja NETPAC Asian Film Festival 2015
- Nominated for Best Foreign Animation/Family Trailer Award (2014)
- Winner of the People's Choice Award, International Movie Trailer Festival 2013
- Winner the category Digital Entertainment – Animation, Indonesia ICT Award 2012
- 1st Winner Indigo Fellowship Category in Film Animation, by PT Telekomunikasi Indonesia, Tbk. (2012)
- Nominee Animated Film in Apresiasi Film Indonesia by Art and Film Board of Ministry of Culture & Education of The Republic of Indonesia. (2012)
