= Kelas Internasional =

- Also known as: Learn Out Loud (SouthEast Asia)
- Genre: Sitcom education slice of life
- Based on: Mind Your Language by Vince Powell
- Starring: Tarra Budiman; Maya Wulan; Boy Idrus; Niniek Aru; Abbas Aminu; Nobuyuki Suzuki; Lee Jeong-hoon; Delano Rijke Daniel
- Country of origin: Indonesia
- Original language: Indonesian
- No. of seasons: 3

Production
- Producer: Dyan Sunu Prastowo
- Running time: 30 minutes (season 1–2); 60 minutes (season 3)
- Production companies: Limelight Pictures; NET. Entertainment

Original release
- Network: NET. Astro Pelangi (Malaysia); Channel 5 (Thailand); GMA (Philippines); VTV4, VTC3 (Vietnam)
- Release: 18 June 2015 – 17 February 2017

Kelas Internasional (English: International Class) is an Indonesian sitcom based on the 1970s British sitcom Mind Your Language. It revolves around someone who teaches an Indonesian language class composing of students from many different countries. It is aired every day at 5:00 P.M. It has been aired in three seasons, the first from 18 June 2015 to 16 March 2016, the second from 28 March 2016 to 19 August 2016, and the third since 22 August 2016 to 17 February 2017.

== Location ==
An international school, with at least three classes:

- Class One (Pak Heru)
- Class Two (Bu Rima)
- Class Three (Pak Budi)
- Principal room (Bu Rika)
- School’s Corridor
- Staff Room
- Canteen

Other Locations:

- Lapin Latte Café
- Ice Juice's Boarding house (Season 3)

== Cast ==
=== School staff ===
- Pak Budi (Tarra Budiman) is the main character of the show. He teaches his foreign students how to speak Indonesian and learn about Indonesian culture. He is very patient, even throughout all the squabbles and problems in his class. He has asthma and must carry an inhaler. Nowadays, he's rarely to be seen in the class, therefore he's replaced by Bu Rika (or another teacher that she appointed)
- Bu Rika (Maya Wulan) is the principal of the school, being promoted from a teacher. She wears glasses, and likes to play mini golf. She is terrified of chickens. She loves to eat and has tried diets many times. They haven't worked. She used to like Carlos.
- Supri Eben (referred to as Sueb/Mang Sueb) (Boy Idrus) is the only cleaning service of the school. He calls Bu Rika "Mother" due to her resemblance to his mother. He speaks the Betawi dialect of the Indonesian language but mixes English into it.
- Bu Kantini (Niniek Arum) is the chef and cashier of the school's canteen. She is a staunch collector of debts. She used to like Carlos. She likes jasmine and also she's the former gangster.
- Pak Michael is the head of foundation of the school. He doesn't appear throughout the series but he able received the call to Bu Rika.

=== Supporting roles (Season 3) ===
- Ice Juice (pronounced /ˈit͡ʃə d͡ʒuˈit͡ʃə/) (Ira Maya Sopha) - She is a boarding house owner wherein Kotaro and Abbas stay after they exited each of their old houses. She has a daughter named Eneng Rosalinda.
- Eneng Rosalinda (Tamara Tyasmara) - She is the only daughter of Mrs. Ice. She is currently studying in a university. She often cooks despite the terrible flavor.
- Rangga (pronounced /raŋˈga/) (Delano Rijke) - He is the new barista in the café co-owned by Nicole (75%) and Ling Ling (25%).
- Lia (Lia Waode) - She is Ling-Ling friends and the new waiters in the cafe. She is also known as the freakishly annoying girl. She appears on Episode 365-392

== Students ==
=== All-season students ===
- (Nigeria) Abbas (Abbas Aminu) - He is often out of money and has debts. He is often scolded by Bu Kantini because of them. During Season 2, he tries a number of ways to get money, including selling "Moooooo Milk" and duck eggs on the roadside. In Season 3, he used to sell "cangcimen", or combination of peanut, sunflower seeds, and candy.
- (China) Ling-Ling (Wiwiek Michiko) - She enjoys selling and often gets in trouble during class for doing so. However, she is the best student in the class. Due to her accent, she cannot pronounce the "R" sound. She once competed with Abbas in selling "Mbee Milk." She used to date Kotaro until she discovered that he was much older than she is. At the beginning of season 3, she and Nicole purchased a café that was previously owned by Carlos through his wife, Angelina.
- (Japan) Kotaro (Nobuyuki Suzuki) - He works as a shiatsu masseur until Season 2. However, in Season 3, his business got bankrupt. Due to his accent, otherwise, he cannot pronounce the "L" sound. He is the second best student in class. He has food allergies.
- (South Korea) Lee Jeong-Yu (Lee Jeong-hoon) - He likes K-pop music, and is often nicknamed him as a "failed boy band".

=== Season 1 students ===
- (Colombia) Carlos De Vega (Carlos Camelo) He owns a cafe called "Lapin Latte Café". He graduated at the end of Season 1 after marrying Angelina. But, in Season 2, he sometimes reappeared when he came back to his café.
- (Brazil) Angelina (Loyd Christina) She has prawn allergies. She graduated at the end of Season 1 with Carlos. She used to like Pak Budi, but finally got married with Carlos. She was the most beautiful in the class until she graduated and was replaced by Nicole.
- (Australia) Tyson (Tyson Lynch) He is an actor. He graduated at the end of Season 1 due to his work schedule. However, he made a brief reappearance in Season 2 during his work break. He likes Angelina, and often fought with Carlos about it, but finally he gave up when he got a new girlfriend.
- (India) Mrs. Palak (Palak Bhansali) She cannot speak Indonesian well, and she often breaks into her native language. She is married and she graduated at the end of Season 1. She has a pet snake named Vijay and a little daughter named Sharmila.

=== Seasons 2 and 3 students ===
- (United States) Daniel Kingston, a.k.a. DK (Langston Hues) - When introducing himself, he said that he was from Detroit, MI. He loves Hip Hop. He likes Nicole.
- (South Korea) Han Yoo-ra - She brings a stuffed shark around, whose name is Kosong (Indonesian for "empty" or "zero"). She has fallen in love with Kosong. Kosong is also very useful for blaming whenever she makes mistakes, which she often does. Once Kosong was lost and she was in shock. She also had hallucinations during this time. She has been named the cutest in class. She is rather careless.
- (Canada) Nicole (Simone Julia) - Her family is very rich. She has OCD. She is not fond of Putu. She does not like DK, as he is always following her around. She has been named the prettiest in class. She has two followers, Mary Jane and Bianca, twins. In the beginning of season 3, together with Ling Ling, she bought a café previously owned by Carlos.
- (Hungary) Kristoff (John Packer) - He is impatient because Pak Budi's class often starts late and he is always complaining. He likes Bu Rika.
- (Russia) Irina (Irina Stroganova) - She likes animals and some kind of sports such as skateboarding. In season 3, she was accepted as the new waitress in Nicole and Ling Ling's café.

== Special appearances ==
=== Season 1 ===
- Aelke Mariska as Makoto, Kotaro's sister.
- Ayu Dyah Pasha as Pak Budi's mother.
- Ben Joshua as Pak Budi's stepfather.
- Imam Darto & Dimas Danang as themselves
- Melaney Ricardo as Bu Aya.
- Malih Tong Tong as Engkong, Sueb's Grandfather
- Poppy Sovia as Bu Nendes
- Josephine Irene as Tina Kantina, Bu Kantin's niece.
- Karina Suwandi as Rina, Bu Rika's Sister
- Ayonk as Rino, Bu Rika's Brother
- Niken Anjani as Sheila.
- Gandhi Fernando as Gandhi, Mrs Palak Ex-Boyfriend
- Angie Ang as Lee's girlfriend.
- Sissy Firman as Tyson's girlfriend.
- Ahmedina as Mr. Arab.
- Acha Sinaga and Tora Sudiro as Toro and Wati.
- Dian Ayu as Chika.
- Nadine Alexandra as Tracy.
- Adul as Pak Abdul, the auditor
- John Packer as Russel, Bu Rika's Brother In-Law and Rina's Husband
- Lidya Lau as Tsen-Tsen
- Fanny Kwok as Mei-Mei
- Elkie Kwee as Ling-Ling's Father
- Yati Surachman as Ibu Broto, Ibu Rika's Mother

=== Season 2 ===
- Yeslin Wang as Mei-Mei, Ling-Ling's sister.
- Darti Manulang as Bu Indun The Traditional Cake Seller
- Eddi Brokoli as Anton.
- Junior Liem as Kakata.
- Jesse Wilde as Robert, a transferred student who loves DJ
- Fanny Ghassani as Sukma.
- Masayu Clara as Ririen.
- Tike Priatnakusumah as Mbak Tike, a spicy chips seller.
- Hannah Al Rashid as Dennisse, the Bully.
- Mike Lucock as Pak Bowo, a casting director.
- Gilian Panalewan as Ayumi.
- Alisia Rininta as Juni and Juli.
- Ana Oktarina as Putri.
- TJ as Mbak TJ, the Gangster.

=== Season 3 ===
- Rangga Moela as Ariel.
- Diky Chandra as Abah, Ibu Juice Late Husband and Eneng Rosalinda Late Father
- MoA Aeim as Soo-hyun.
- Melaney Ricardo as Bu Butet.
- Nadine Alexandra as Indah, Pak Budi Ex-Girlfriend.
- Jessica Veranda as Keiko, Kotaro's Girlfriend.
- Joana Tjo as Emiko, the scary student in class, which she's known as a "Weird Girl"
- Cindy Thefannie as Han So-ri, the delinquent student in class.
- Ence Bagus as Mulyana, also known as Datuk Maringgih by Abbas and Lee.
- Alexa Key as Shinta, Rangga Ex-Girlfriend.
- Cut Mini as Bi Entin, Bu Juice Sister and Eneng Rosalinda coquettish Aunt.
- Cut Tari as Ibu Nirmala, Ibu Juice High School Rival.
- Brandon Nicholas Salim as Adit, Ibu Nirmala Son's and Eneng Rosalinda Love Interest.
- Frans Nicholas as Yoko, Eneng Rosalinda Childhood Friends.
- Violla Georgie as Ming Zhu, Ling-Ling Cousins.
- Surya Lee as Ming Li, Ling-Ling Secret Admire.
- Shail Shah as Shail, Mrs Palak Cousins.

== Substitute teachers (special appearances) ==
- Sylvia Genpati as Bu Silvy
- Melaney Ricardo as Bu Aya
- Poppy Sovia as Bu Nendes
- Rio Dewanto as Pak Reza
- Nabila Putri as Bu Armi

== International broadcasts ==
- (Philippines) GMA
  - October 12, 2015 - July 18, 2016 (Season 1)
  - July 11, 2016 - February 3, 2017 (Season 2)
  - February 16, 2017 - January 11, 2018 (Season 3)
- (Malaysia) Astro Pelangi
- (Vietnam) VTV4
  - November 9 - June 13, 2016 (Season 1)
  - July 11, 2016 - future (Season 2)
- (Vietnam) VTC3
  - March 7 - future (Season 3)
- (Thailand) Channel 5
  - November 10, 2015 – present (Season 1)
  - August 16, 2016 - future (Season 2)
  - May 16 - future (Season 3)
