= Aryanto =

Aryanto is an Indonesian name. Notable people with the name include:

- Aryanto Yuniawan (born 1977), Indonesian film director
- Fachruddin Aryanto (born 1989), Indonesian footballer
