= Angela Nazar =

Indonesian singer and actress (born 1993)

Angela Vero
- Born: Angela Noëlla Nazar; December 13, 1993 (age 32); Amsterdam, Netherlands
- Occupations: Singer; Actress
- Years active: 2013–present
- Labels: Trinity Optima Production; Sony Music Indonesia
- Website: www.angelanazarofficial.com

Angela "Nazar" Vero (born December 13, 1993) is an Indonesian singer and actress. Born and raised in Amsterdam, Netherlands, she studied at The Performing Arts School Nederlandse Pop Academie (NPAC) in Utrecht. She began her career in the show business in early 2013 when she auditioned for the television talent show X Factor Netherlands season 5. Later in 2013 she was invited by Indonesian legend and music maestro Yovie Widianto to perform as one of the guest stars at his masterpiece concert Yovie and His Friends: Irreplaceable held at Jakarta, Indonesia's biggest concert venue JCC Senayan. She performed Yovie Widianto's classic hit ' Sebatas Mimpi ', which she recycled and co-wrote the English version, that was released on the compilation album Yovie and His Friends: Irreplaceable (Repackage). In 2014 she made her movie debut playing the role of Tania in the Indonesian drama romance Mantan Terindah The Movie, produced by famous Indonesian actress and film producer Marcella Zalianty (KEANA Production), which her first single ' Demi Hati ', was released by music label Trinity Optima Production as one of the original soundtracks of the movie.

== Discography ==
=== Singles ===
Year	Title	Album	Composer	Producer	Label
2014	"Sebatas Mimpi" (English version)	Yovie and His Friends: Irreplaceable (Repackage)	Yovie Widianto, Angela Nazar	Yovie Widianto	Yovie Widianto Music Factory
2014	"Demi Hati"	OST. Mantan Terindah The Movie	Yovie Widianto	Ari Renaldi	Trinity Optima Production
2015	"Mengingatmu"	OST. Battle of Surabaya	Aryanto Yuniawan, Brama Shandy	Tohpati	Trinity Optima Production
2016	"Work It"	TBA	Ollipop, Daniel Caesar, Ludwig Lindell, Cage & Oneye	Ollipop, Caesar & Loui, Cage & Oneye	Sony Music Indonesia

== Filmography ==
=== Movies ===
Year	Title	Role
2014	Mantan Terindah The Movie	Tania
2015	Battle of Surabaya (International version) voice dubber	Yumna
