= Nobuyuki Suzuki (actor, born 1963) =

Japanese actor

- 鈴木伸幸
- Born: July 20, 1963 (age 62); Tokyo, Japan
- Occupations: Actor; film director
- Years active: 1987–present
- Spouse: Indah Pratiwi Kusuma

Nobuyuki Suzuki (鈴木伸幸, Suzuki Nobuyuki) is a Japanese actor and film director based in Indonesia and in Tokyo, Japan.

== Filmography ==
- Untuk Rena (2005)
- Naga Bonar Jadi 2 (2007)
- Cinta Setaman (2008)
- Rumah Maida (2009)
- Hati Merdeka (2011)
- Soegija (2012)
- Sang Kiai (2013)
- Soekarno (2013)
- 12 Menit Untuk Selamanya (2014)
- Battle of Surabaya (2015)
- The East (2020)

== TV series ==
- Kelas Internasional (2015)
