= M. Suyanto =

Indonesian movie producer and writer (born 1960)

- Born: Mohammad Suyanto; February 20, 1960 (age 66); Madiun, Indonesia
- Occupations: Writer, Producer, Director, Entrepreneur, Lecturer
- Years active: 1994–present
- Spouse: Dra. Anisah Aini
- Children: 2
- Website: msuyanto.com

M. Suyanto (Mohammad Suyanto) is the Founder and Rector of AMIKOM University (Universitas AMIKOM Yogyakarta), an Indonesian movie producer and writer known for Battle of Surabaya. He is a producer, director and writer under United Talent Agency, Beverly Hills, California. He is also Professor of Strategic Management, Marketing and E-Business. He has written 40 books and he has received more than forty international awards in the field of film.

== Education ==
Suyanto founded a private university in Yogyakarta, on October 11, 1994, STMIK Amikom. A decade later, Universitas Amikom Yogyakarta was highlighted as a leading example for "A New Dynamic: Private Higher Education” by UNESCO at World Conference on Higher Education 2009.

Suyanto received his Doctor in economics from Airlangga University in 2007 and his Bachelor of Science degree in physics from Gadjah Mada University in 1987. He received his Master in Management from Gadjah Mada University in 1993.

== Books ==
- Directing of Oscar Winners and Box Office (Andi Yogyakarta, 2023)
- Visual Effects of Oscar Winners and Box Office (Andi Yogyakarta, 2021)
- Editing of Oscar Winners and Box Office (Andi Yogyakarta, 2021)
- Cinematography of Oscar Winners and Box Office (Andi Yogyakarta, 2020)
- Alchemy: Skills for Success and Happiness (Andi Yogyakarta, 2020)
- From A Start-Up To A Unicorn (Andi Yogyakarta, 2019)
- Starting A Business From Zero (Andi Yogyakarta, 2019)
- Muhammad Marketing Strategy (Andi Yogyakarta, 2018)
- Photopreneurship (Andi Yogyakarta, 2017)
- The Secret of Taiwan SME Worldwide in Creative Industries (Andi Yogyakarta, 2015)
- The Oscar Winner and Box Office: The Secret of Screenplay (Andi Yogyakarta, 2014)
- Battle of Surabaya: The Adventure of Musa (Seri Cinta Tanah Air) (Andi Yogyakarta, 2014)
- Muhammad Business Strategy and Ethics
- Everyone can become a successful entrepreneur (Andi Yogyakarta, 2011)
- Small is Powerful (Andi Yogyakarta, 2009)
- Strategic Management: Global Most Admired Companies (Andi Yogyakarta, 2007)
- Marketing Strategy for Top Indonesian Brands (Andi Yogyakarta, 2007)
- Strategic Revolution: Changing Business Processes to Explode Companies (Andi Yogyakarta, 2007)
- World class outdoor advertising design strategy (Andi Yogyakarta, 2006)
- Designing World Class Cartoon Films (Andi Yogyakarta, 2006)
- 15 Secrets to Turning Failure into Success (Andi Yogyakarta, 2006)
- Designing a World Class Cartoon Film (Andi Yogyakarta, 2006)
- 11 Secrets to starting a business with no money (Andi Yogyakarta, 2005)
- Television Advertising Design Strategies for World's Top Companies (Andi Yogyakarta, 2005)
- SMART IN Leadership: Learning from the World's Top Leaders (Andi Yogyakarta, 2005)
- Introduction to Information Technology for Business (Andi Yogyakarta, 2005)
- Analysis and Design of Multimedia Applications for Marketing (Andi Yogyakarta, 2004)
- Being Smart in Entrepreneurship: Learning from World Top Successful Entrepreneur (Andi Yogyakarta, 2004)
- Graphical Design Application for Advertising (Andi Yogyakarta, 2004)
- Analysis & Design of Multimedia Applications for Marketing (Andi Yogyakarta, 2004)
- Multimedia Tools to Increase Competitive Advantage (Andi Yogyakarta, 2003)
- E-Commerce Advertising Strategy for World Top Companies (Andi Yogyakarta, 2003)
- Introduction to Electronic Data Processing (AMIKOM, 2000)
- Management (AMIKOM, 1999)
- Marketing Management (IMKI, 1997)
- Magagement Information Systems (IMKI, 1996)
- Accounting Information Systems (IMKI, 1996)
- BASIC Programming (IMKI, 1996)
- BASIC Programming Advanced (IMKI, 1996)
- Lotus 1-2-3 (IMKI, 1995)

== Awards ==
- Best Feature. PRISMA (Rome Independent Film Awards). 2018. Roma, Italia.
- Best Animation. Glendale International Film Festival. 2018. Glendale, USA.
- Official Selection Of Feature Animation. Woodbury International Film Festival. 2019. Salt Lake City, USA.
- Official Selection Of Best Feature. North Europe International Film Festival. 2018. London, United Kingdom.
- Silver Award Of Digital Content. AICTA (ASEAN Information And Communication Technology Awards). 2018. Bali, Indonesia.
- Semi-Finalist. Sydney Indie Film Festival. 2018. Sydney, Australia.
- Best Animation, Hollywood International Motion Pictures Film Festival 2018
- Best Animation Film, European Cinematography Awards, 2018
- Best Animation, Amsterdam International Film Festival 2018
- Nominee Best Film, Amsterdam International Film Festival 2018
- Nominee Best Sound Design, Amsterdam International Film Festival 2018
- Best Animation, London, Gold Movie Awards 2018
- Best Animation, Oniros Film Awards 2018
- Outstanding Achievement Award - Animated Film, Calcutta International Cult Film Festival 2018.
- Best Animation Feature Film, Southern Cone International Film Festival 2018
- Best Animation, Festival International De Cine Del Cono Sur, 2018
- Best Animation, Venezuela, Ficocc Five Continents International Film Festival 2018
- Best Writer, Toronto, ATFF SPRING Film Festival 2018
- Nominee Best Animation, London International Film Festival 2018
- Nominee Best Original Screenplay, of A Feature Film, London International Film Festival 2018
- Nominee Best Editing, of A Feature Film, London International Film Festival 2018
- The Best Alumni, Category Innovation, Design and Creativity, Universitas Gadjah Mada, 2017.
- Best Animation, Milan International Film Festival 2017
- Best Animation, Berlin International Film Festival 2017
- Best Animation, Nice International Film Festival 2017
- Figure Change Award, Republika 2016.
- Gold Remi Award, Worldfest, Houston, International Film Festival 2016
- Grandprize Winner, SICAF 2016, The 20th Seoul International Cartoon & Animation Festival
- Winner Best Animation, 3rd Noida International Film Festival 2016
- Official Selection, Holland Animation Film Festival 2016
- Official Selection, Animation Dingle, Ireland 2016
- Special Screening, New Chitose Airport Animation Festival Japan, 2016
- Special Screening, Athens Animfest, Greece, 2016
- The Faces of Indonesia Cinema Today, 10th Jogja NETPAC Asian Film Festival 2015
- Winner National Intellectual Property Award 2015-Creative Human -Creative Economy field
- Nominated for Best Foreign Animation/Family Trailer Award (2014)
- Winner International Movie Trailer Festival (IMTF) 2013
- Winner the category Digital Entertainment – Animation (Battle of Surabaya), Indonesia ICT Award 2012
- Nominae Digital Entertainment – Animation (Belajar Di sekolah), Indonesia ICT Award 2012
- Nominee Digital Entertainment – Animation (Pohon Pisang), Indonesia ICT Award 2012.
- Nominee Digital Entertainment – Animation (Layang-layang), Indonesia ICT Award 2012
- Nominee Digital Entertainment – Animation (Hadiah Kejujuran), Indonesia ICT Award 2012
- 1st Winner Indigo Fellowship Category in Film Animation, by PT Telekomunikasi Indonesia, Tbk. (2012)
- Nominee Animated Film in Apresiasi Film Indonesia by Art and Film Board of Ministry of Culture & Education of The Republic of Indonesia. (2012)

== Filmography ==
Producer

- Kinah & Redjo (Post Production)
- AJISAKA: The King and the Flower of Life (executive producer)
- Golden Snail (filming)
- Tumbal: The Ritual (executive producer), 2018.
- November 10 (executive producer) / (producer), 2015
- Petualangan Abdan (short animation) Episode: Belajar Di Sekolah, 2008
- Petualangan Abdan (short animation) Episode:Pohon Pisang, 2009.
- Petualangan Abdan (short animation) episode: (Layang-layang), 2010
- Petualangan Abdan (short animation) episode: (Hadiah Kejujuran), 2011

Writer

- Kinah & Redjo (Post Production)
- AJISAKA: The King and the Flower of Life (original story) (filming)
- Golden Snail (filming)
- November 10 (story), 2015.
- Petualangan Abdan (short animation) Episode: Belajar Di Sekolah, 2008
- Petualangan Abdan (short animation) Episode: Pohon Pisang, 2009.
- Petualangan Abdan (short animation) episode: Layang-layang, 2010
- Petualangan Abdan (short animation) episode: Hadiah Kejujuran, 2011

Director

- Kinah & Redjo (Post Production)
- AJISAKA: The King and the Flower of Life (filming)
- Golden Snail (filming)

== Known for ==
- Battle of Surabaya
