= Melaney Ricardo =

Indonesian actress, presenter, radio announcer, and content creator (born 1981)

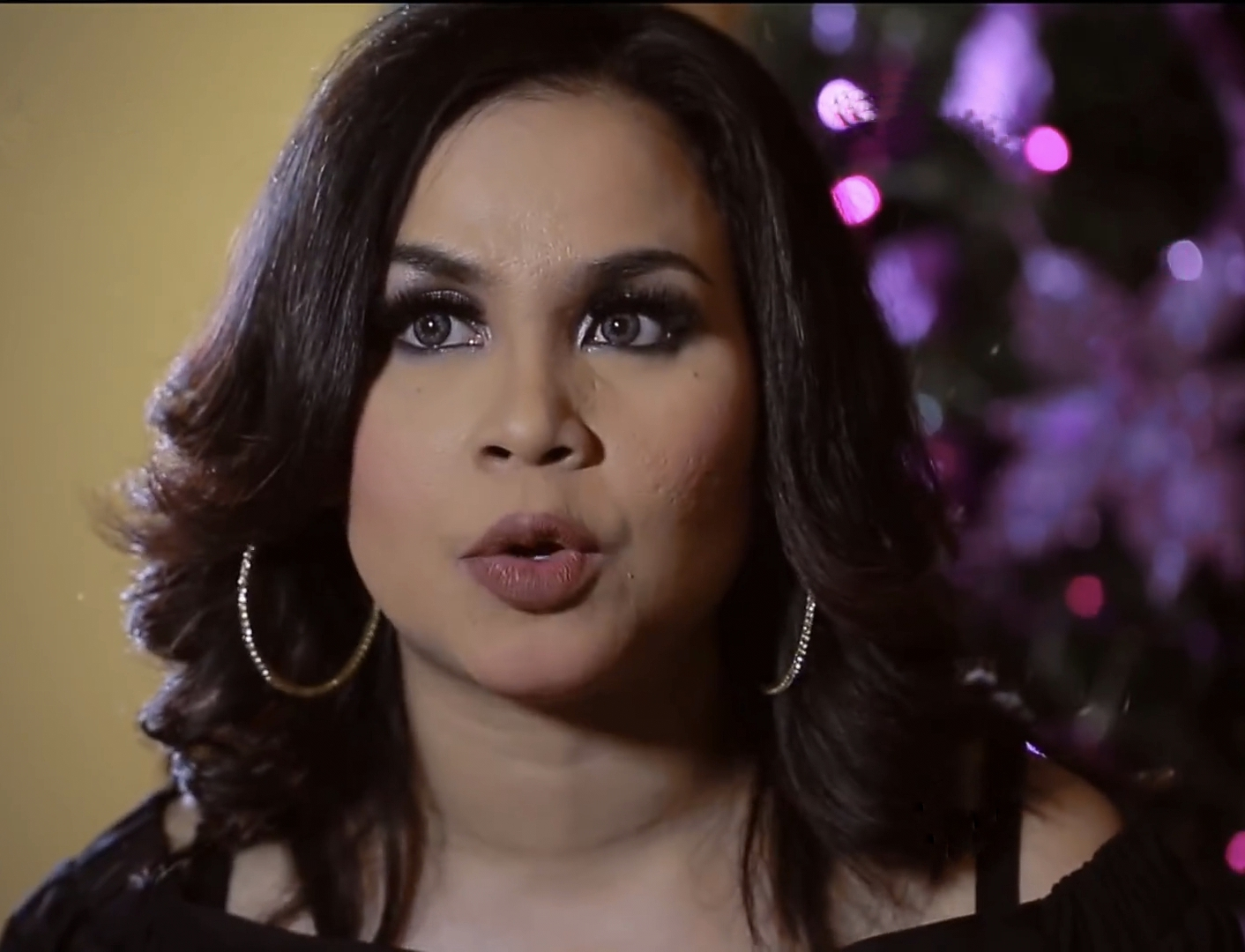
- Melaney Ricardo in 2016
- Born: Agnes Melanie Siahaan; February 24, 1981 (age 45); Medan, North Sumatera, Indonesia
- Occupations: Presenter, Radio announcer, Content creator, Comedian, Celebrity

Agnes Melanie Siahaan (born 24 February 1981), better known by the stage name Melaney Ricardo, is an Indonesian actress, presenter, radio announcer, and content creator. She was known for her comedic style and chatty appearance, and is credited as one of the very extrovert presenter.

== Early life ==
Melaney Ricardo was born Agnes Melanie Siahaan on 24 February 1981 in Medan, North Sumatera, as the eldest child and daughter of the three children of Ricardo Siahaan and Sylvia Herawatie. She had a younger sister, Nana, her private manager, and a younger brother, Roy, a singer. Melaney Ricardo was raised in Jakarta and only lived in Medan for a year, and completed her high school education there before went to Trisakti University majoring in international relations.

== Personal life ==
Melaney Ricardo is a Christian. In 2015, her name was used for scam Facebook account by a pedophile and sexual predator who held a photo contest Bayi Mandi Telanjang (Baby Naked Swim). She later announced on her Twitter account to report and block the fake account.

=== Marriages and relationships ===
Melaney Ricardo is married to Tyson James Lynch, an Australian English teacher, on 31 July 2010. They had two children: Chloe Valentine and Courage Jordan.

=== Health ===
On 3 October 2020, Melaney Ricardo was diagnosed with COVID-19 and was hospitalized for seventeen days. In 2023, Melaney Ricardo revealed that she was diagnosed with adenomyosis and underwent hysterectomy procession.

== Career ==
Melaney Ricardo started her career as a radio announcer for Hard Rock FM and Trax FM, and made her sitcom debut in private television in 2010. She then worked as a presenter for various shows, such as: Mantap, Klik!, Inside, Dahsyat, Biang Rumpi No Secret, etc. She was known for her comedic and open manner.

Melaney Ricardo made her film debut in Tak Kemal Maka Tak Sayang (2014) and starred in several films, such as: Relationshit (2015), Sawadikap (2016), Jomblo Reboot (2017), Benyamin Biang Kerok and Bodyguard Ugal-ugalan (2018), Trinity Traveler (2019), and Benyamin Biang Kerok 2 (2020).

== Works ==
=== Film ===
Year	Title	Role	Notes
2014	Tak Kemal Maka Tak Sayang	Counseling teacher	
2015	Relationshit	Mrs. MLM	
2016	Sawadikap	Atun	
2017	Jomblo Reboot	Master of Ceremony	
2018	Benyamin Biang Kerok	Margareth	
2018	Bodyguard Ugal-ugalan	Boris's wife	
2019	Trinity Traveler	Inang Trinity	
2020	Benyamin Biang Kerok 2	Margareth	

=== Television ===
- Mantap (ANTV)
- Klik! (ANTV)
- SUPER GAME (ANTV)
- Loelebay (O Channel)
- Raja Gombal (Trans7)
- Pesbukers (ANTV)
- Tri Angel (ANTV)
- !nside (TRANS TV)
- Dahsyat (RCTI)
- Mel's Update (ANTV)
- Don't Stop Me Now (Kompas TV)
- Campur-Campur (ANTV)
- Lawan Tawa (Global TV)
- Poci (O Channel)
- Biang Rumpi No Secret (Trans TV)
- O Entertainment Malam (O Channel)
- Hotman Paris Show (iNews)
- Energen Super Gameshow (GTV)
- Suka-Suka Sore-Sore (MNCTV)
- Call Me Mel (iNews)
- IPOP (Informasi Populer) (NET.)
- In The Kost (NET.)
- Kopi Viral (Trans TV)
- Ramadan In The Kost (NET.)
- The Sultan (SCTV)
- Hot NET. (NET.)
- eSports Star Indonesia (GTV)
- The Hotman (Trans TV)
- Dahsyat Weekend Sore (RCTI)

=== Sitcom ===
- Stasiun Cinta (Trans TV)
- Keluarga Santuy (Trans 7)

=== Radio ===
- Hard Rock FM, Jakarta
- Trax FM

=== Podcast ===
- The Centils
