= University of Amikom Yogyakarta =

Higher education institution in Sleman, Indonesia

University of AMIKOM Yogyakarta
- Universitas AMIKOM Yogyakarta
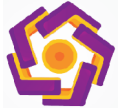
- Motto: Creative Economy Park
- Type: Private
- Established: 11 October 1994
- Rector: M. Suyanto
- Undergraduates: 13.882
- Postgraduates: 310
- Location: North Ring Road Street, Condong Catur, Depok, Sleman Regency, Special Region of Yogyakarta, Indonesia; 7°45′36″S 110°24′32″E
- Colors: Purple
- Website: www.amikom.ac.id
- Location within Java Location within Indonesia

The University of AMIKOM Yogyakarta is a private IT college in Sleman Regency, Special Region of Yogyakarta, Indonesia. The college was established on December 29, 1992, under the auspices of the Yogyakarta AMIKOM Foundation. It has 2 diploma programs, 13 undergraduate programs, and 1 postgraduate program; all are accredited. The university concentrates on efforts to become the world's leading university in the field of the creative economy based on entrepreneurship. The university currently has more than 11,000 active students, and has more than 3,000 new students every year.

The university also runs commercial businesses, such as television channels, radio channels, 2D & 3D animation film production for cinema and television, software design and development, internet connection services, TV and outdoor advertising, computer skills training, education/IT/creative economy consulting, and animated film marketing network. This commercial company provides students with opportunities for internships. The university claims to produce 'graduates with global quality, productive, innovative, entrepreneurial, professional, especially in computer-based and informatics-based knowledge, business and entrepreneurship, innovation and creative industry'.

== History ==
The university evolved from a college diploma program AMIKOM Yogyakarta to become an undergraduate and post graduate program.

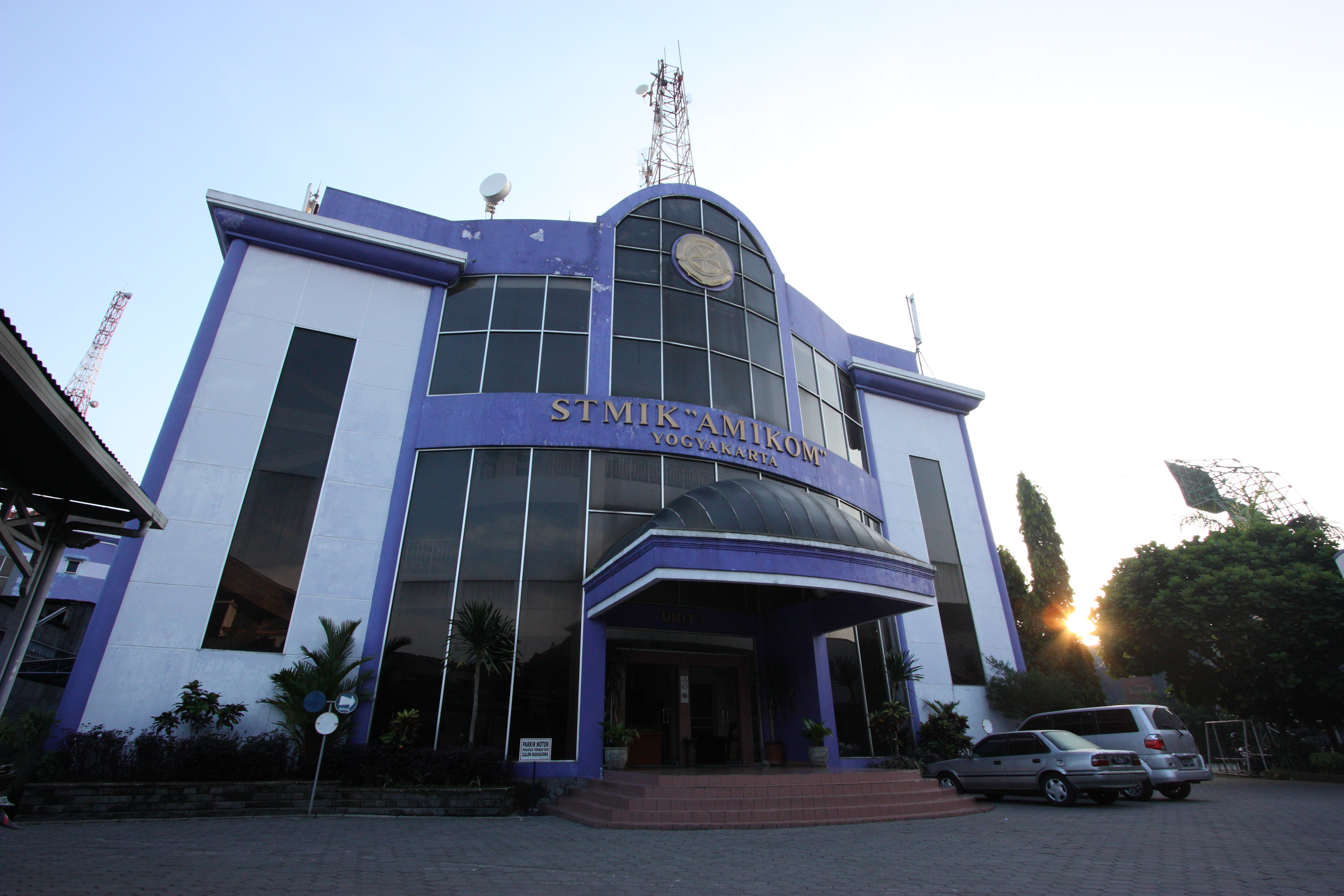
Unit 1 Building

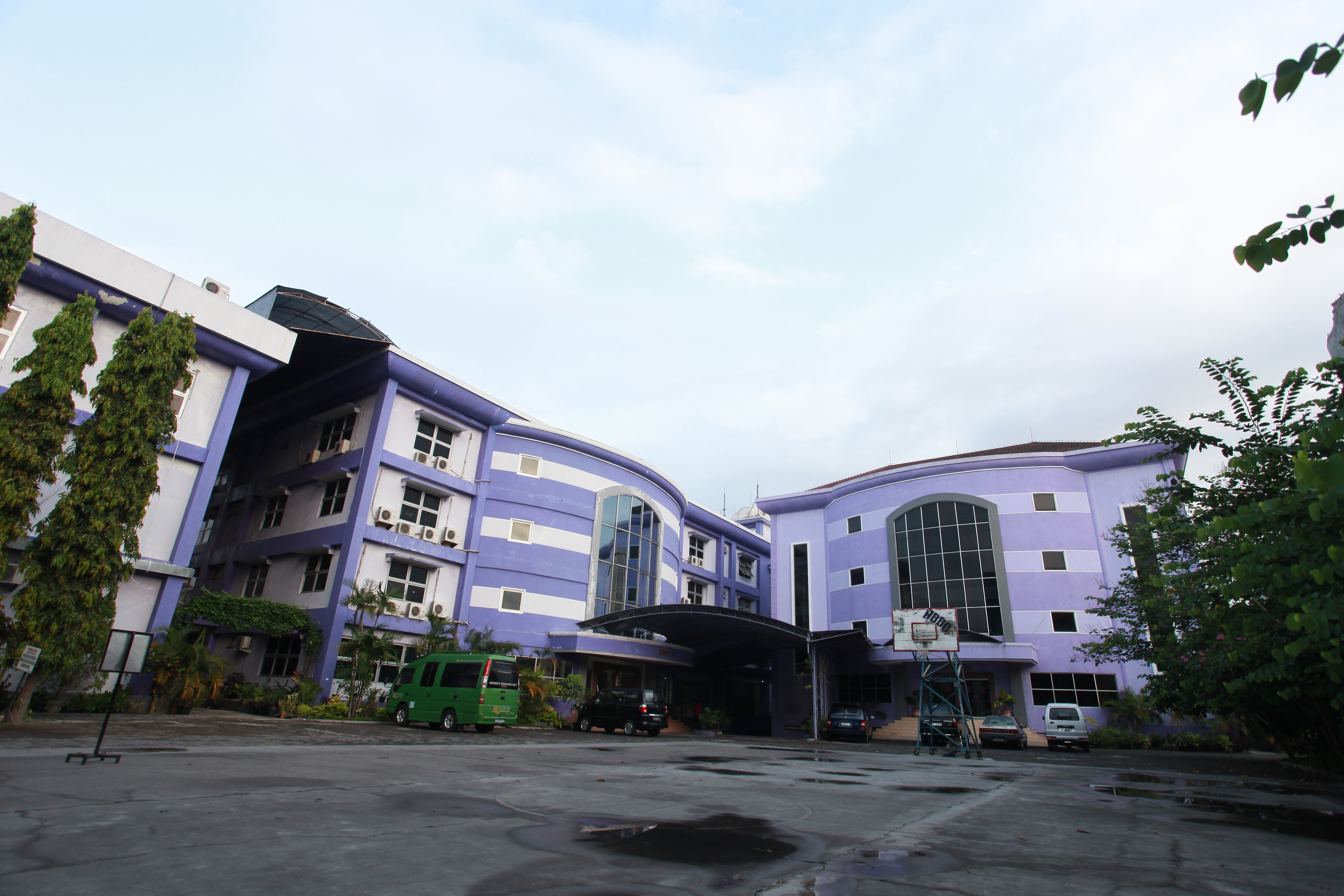
Unit 2 and 3 Building

In 1993 the first 44 students enrolled at the Department of Information Management. A year later AMIKOM achieved listed status by the Minister of Education and Culture Republic of Indonesia No. 084/D/O/1994 dated October 11, 1994.

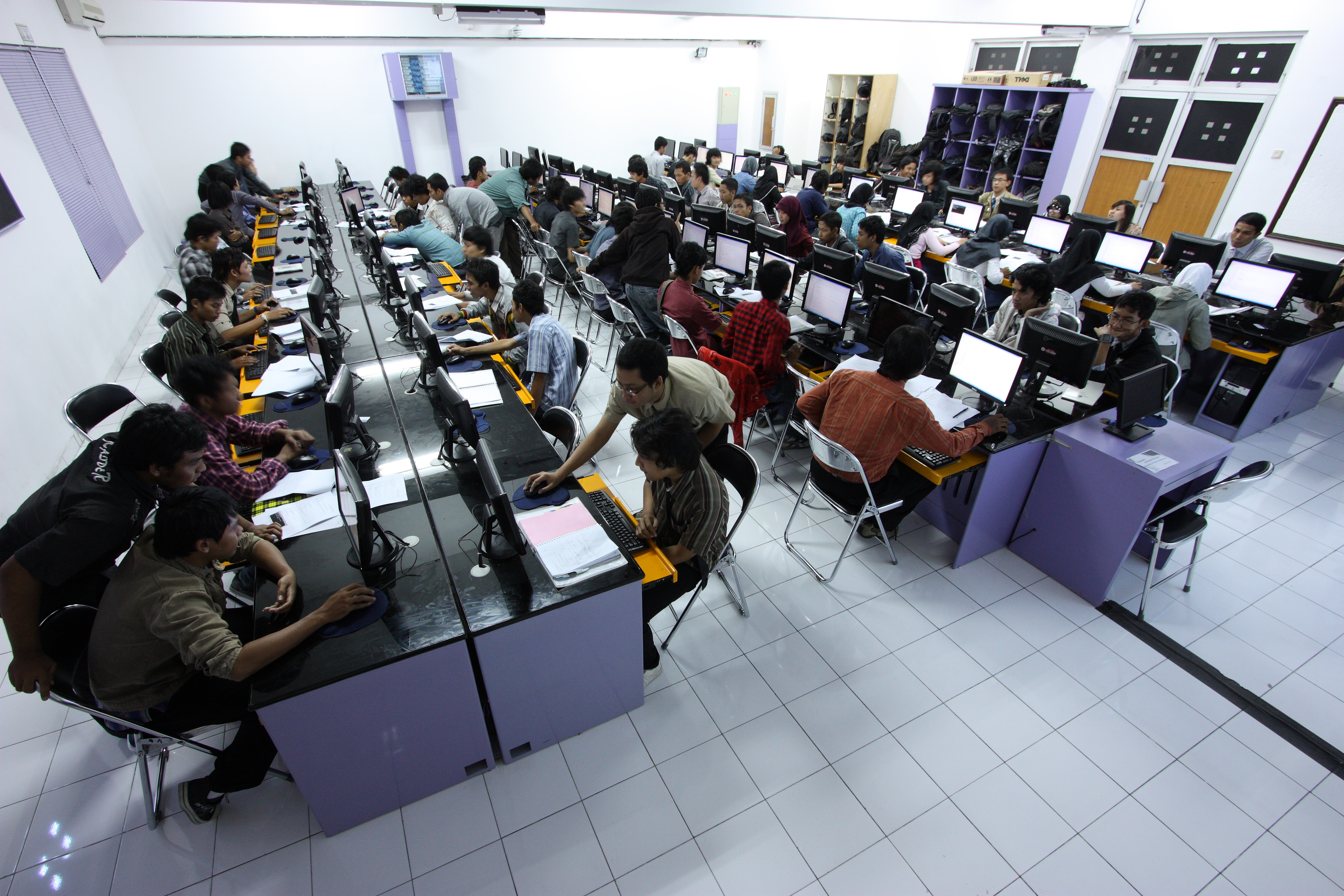
Programming Lab

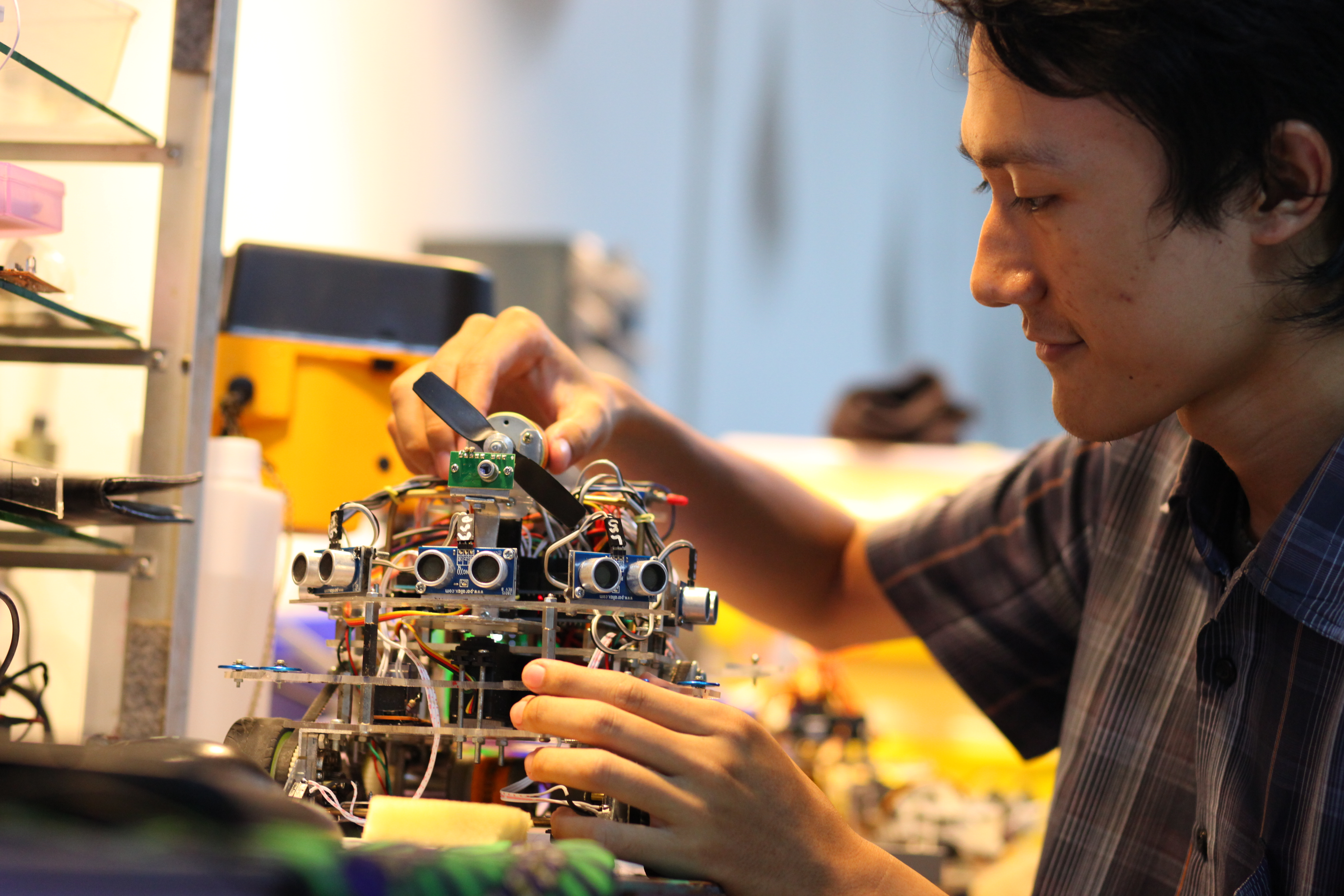
Lab Experiment

Before, AMIKOM operated one campus in Wolter Mongonsidi Street and one in North RingRoad Street in Yogyakarta. Beginningin academic year 1998/1999 AMIKOM converted a shop building into an integrated campus in the North Ring Road, with 9 classrooms, 1 academic service, 1 library, occupying 2 floors. All academic services moved into this integrated campus, except for some services and a computer lab located about 5.6 miles from main campus.

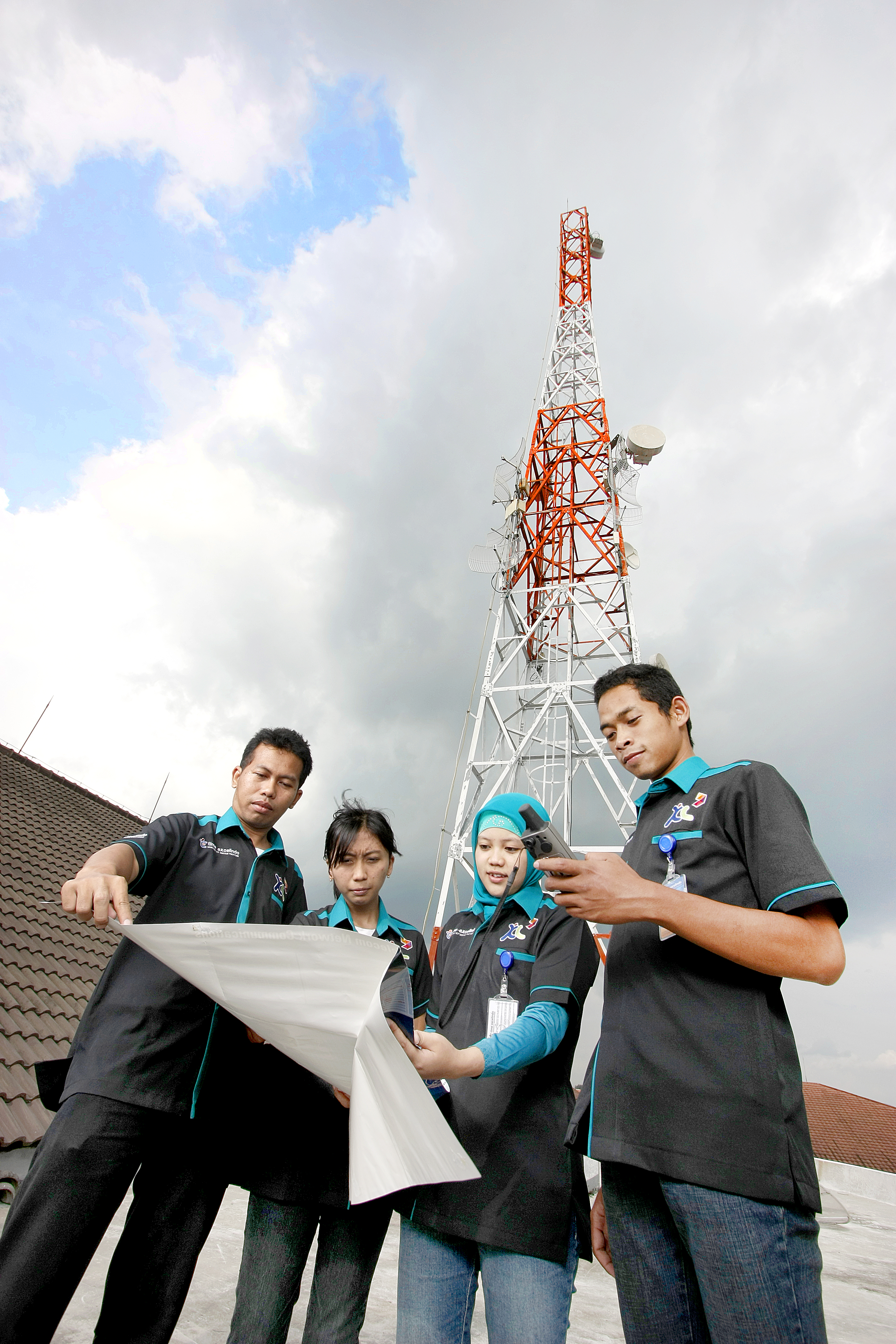
Business Unit - Time Excelindo (ISP)

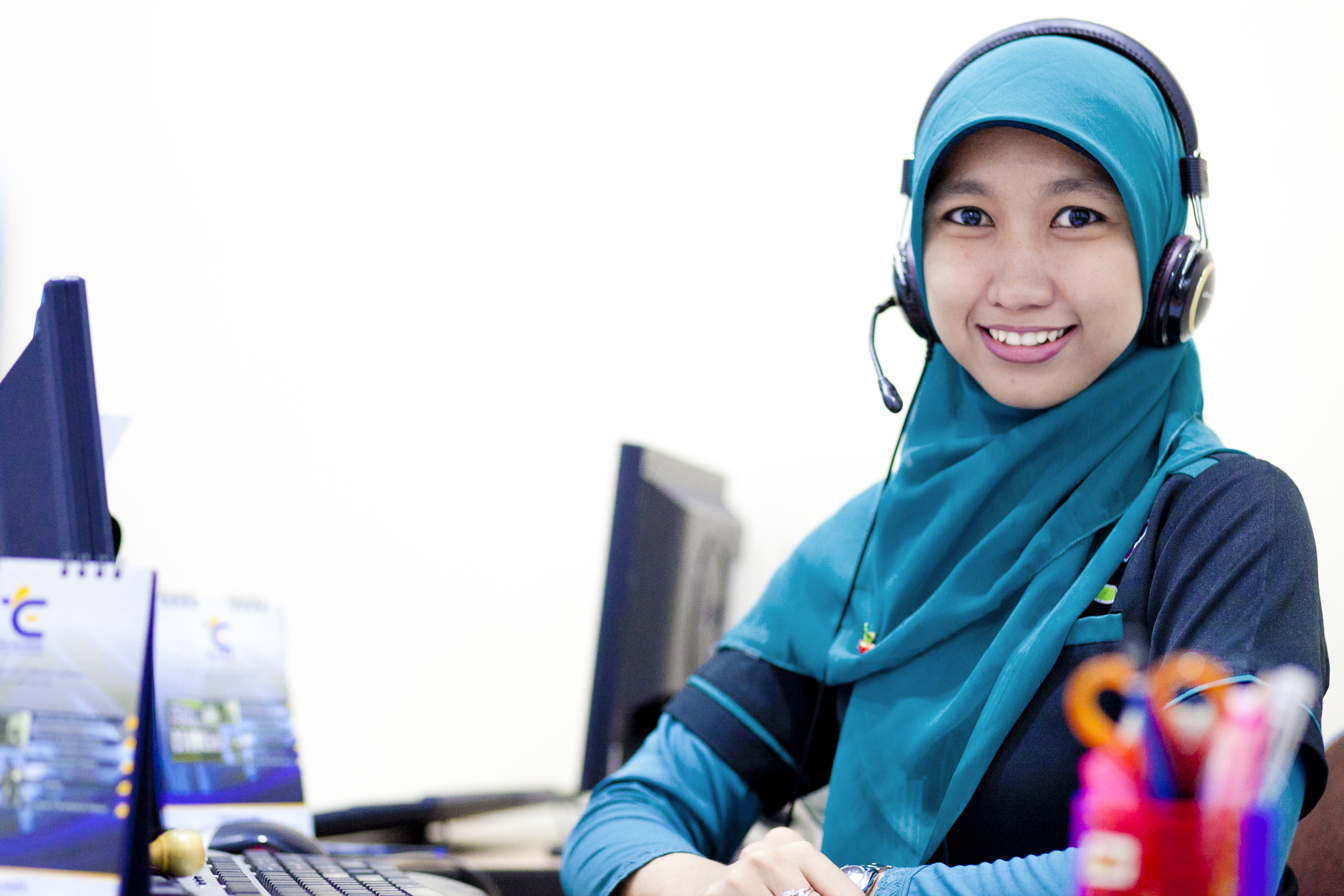
Business Unit - Time Excelindo (Software House)

In 2002, Academy of AMIKOM become STMIK AMIKOM Yogyakarta. AMIKOM obtained land and built its own building next to the existing campus. The building was occupied and used for lectures in the academic year 2001/2002. It consists of 3 floors used as an administrative center, lecture halls and laboratories.

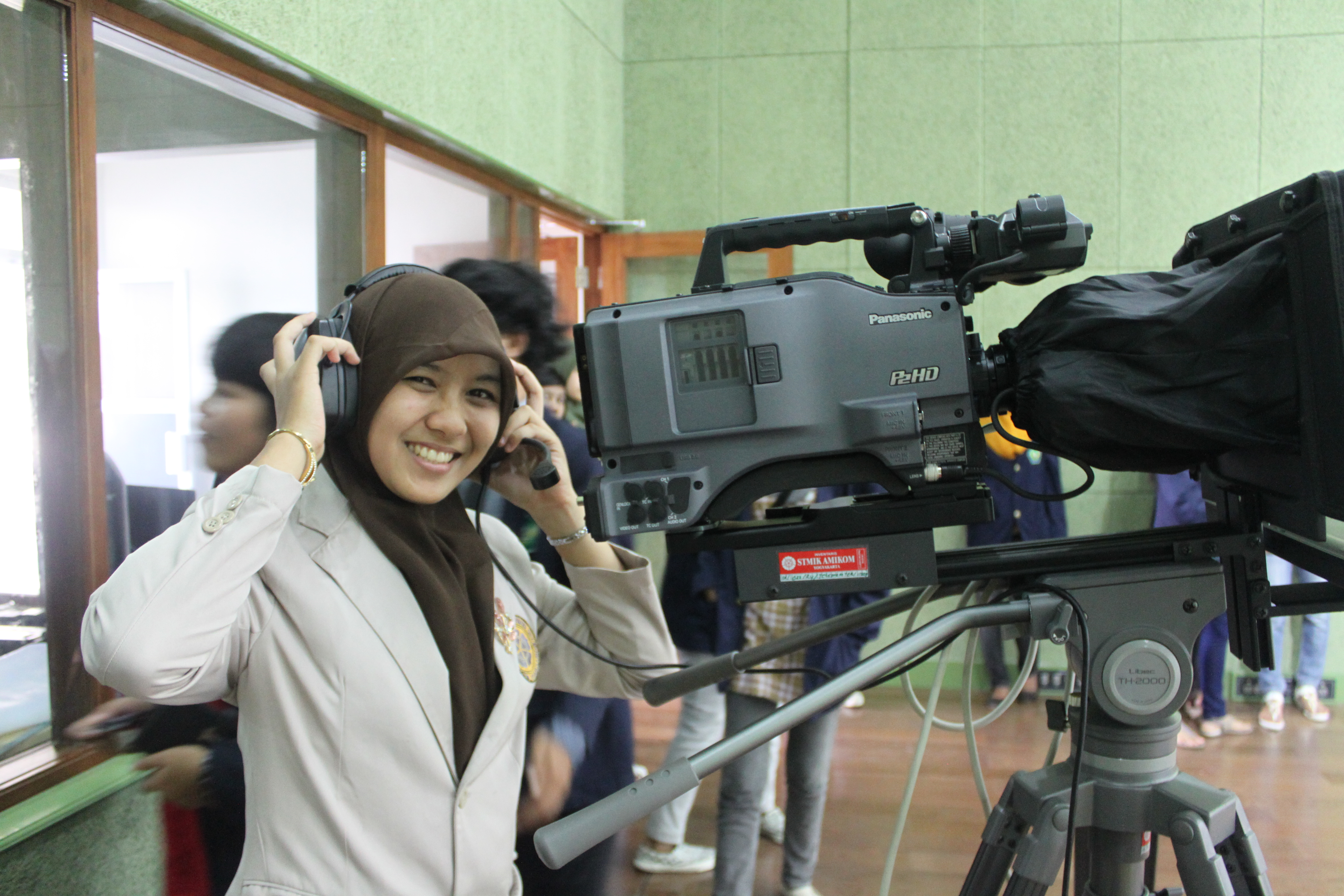
TV Studio

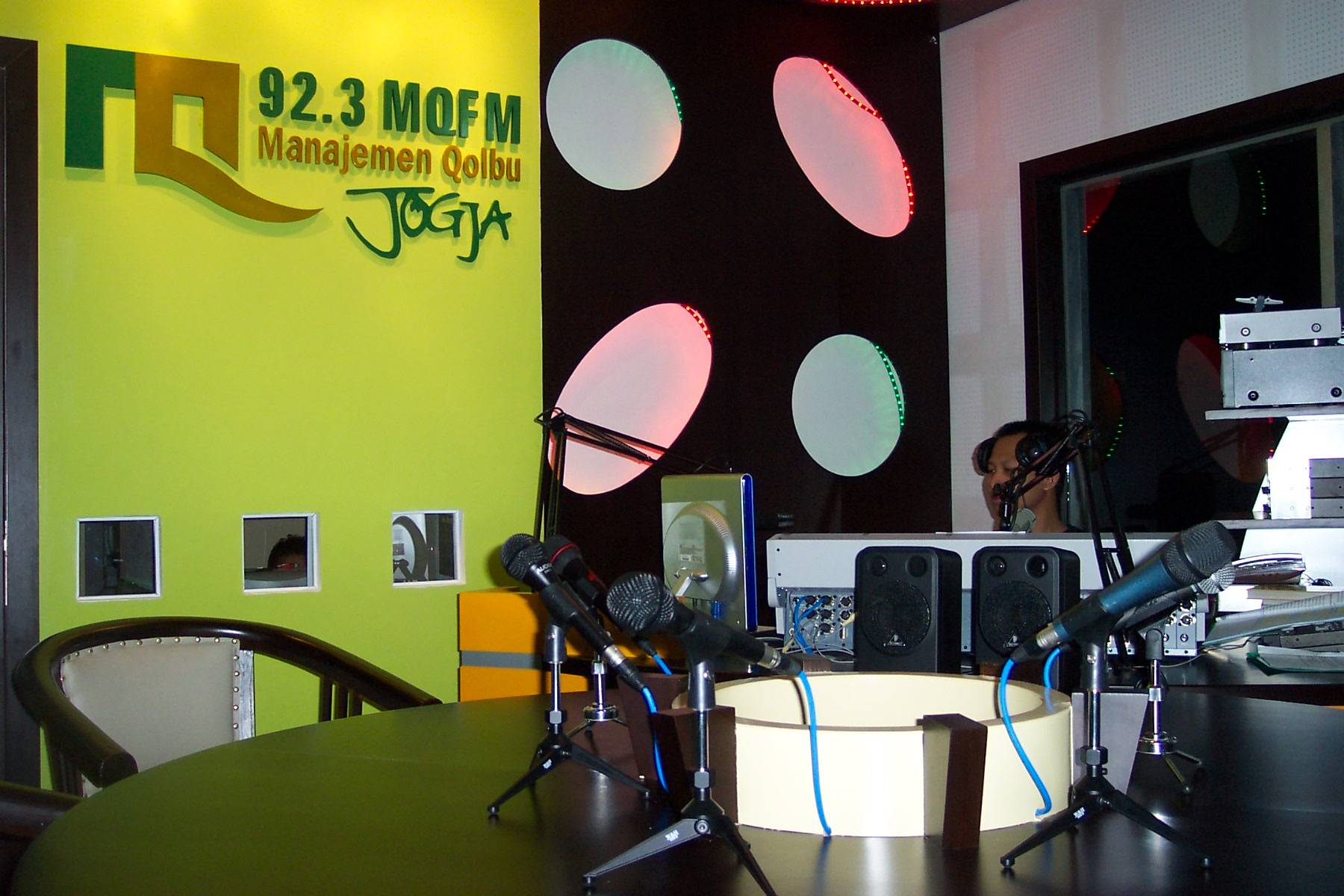
Radio Station

Beginning with academic year 2003/2004, all academic activities moved to Building I and II Integrated Campus, and in May 2004 construction of Unit II and Unit III began. The building is used for lectures, meeting rooms (Hall 1 and Hall 2), computer laboratory, animated film production, a Graduation Exam Room, Mosque and a Technical Services Unit. Unit III building provided space for business units, polyclinics, the household and a Theory and Practice room to host graduate programs and a language laboratory. In 2007 Unit IV was constructed for administrative services, a bank and services BAAK, BAU, HRD, Theory Lecture Room Diploma and Under graduated Program.

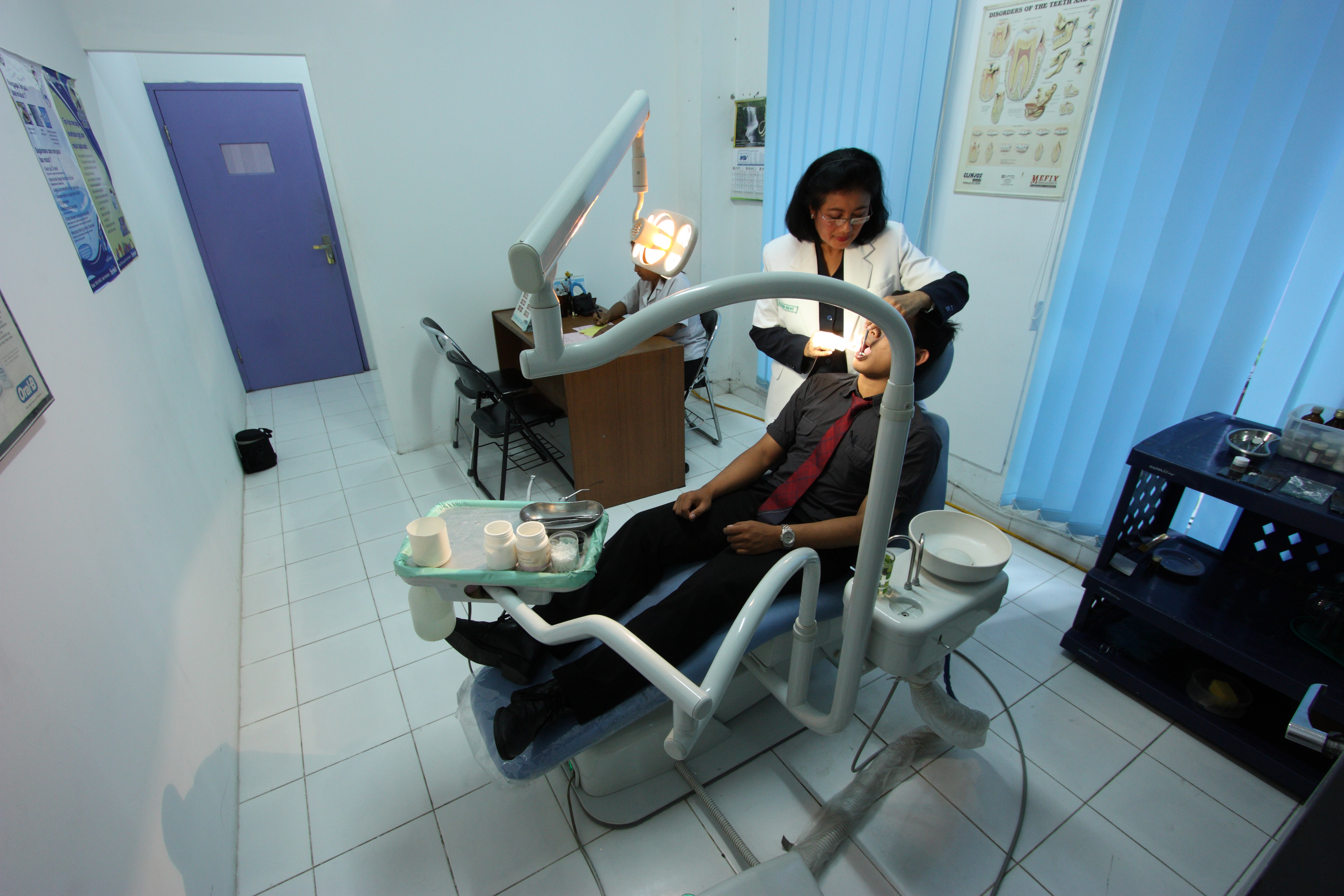
Dental Clinic

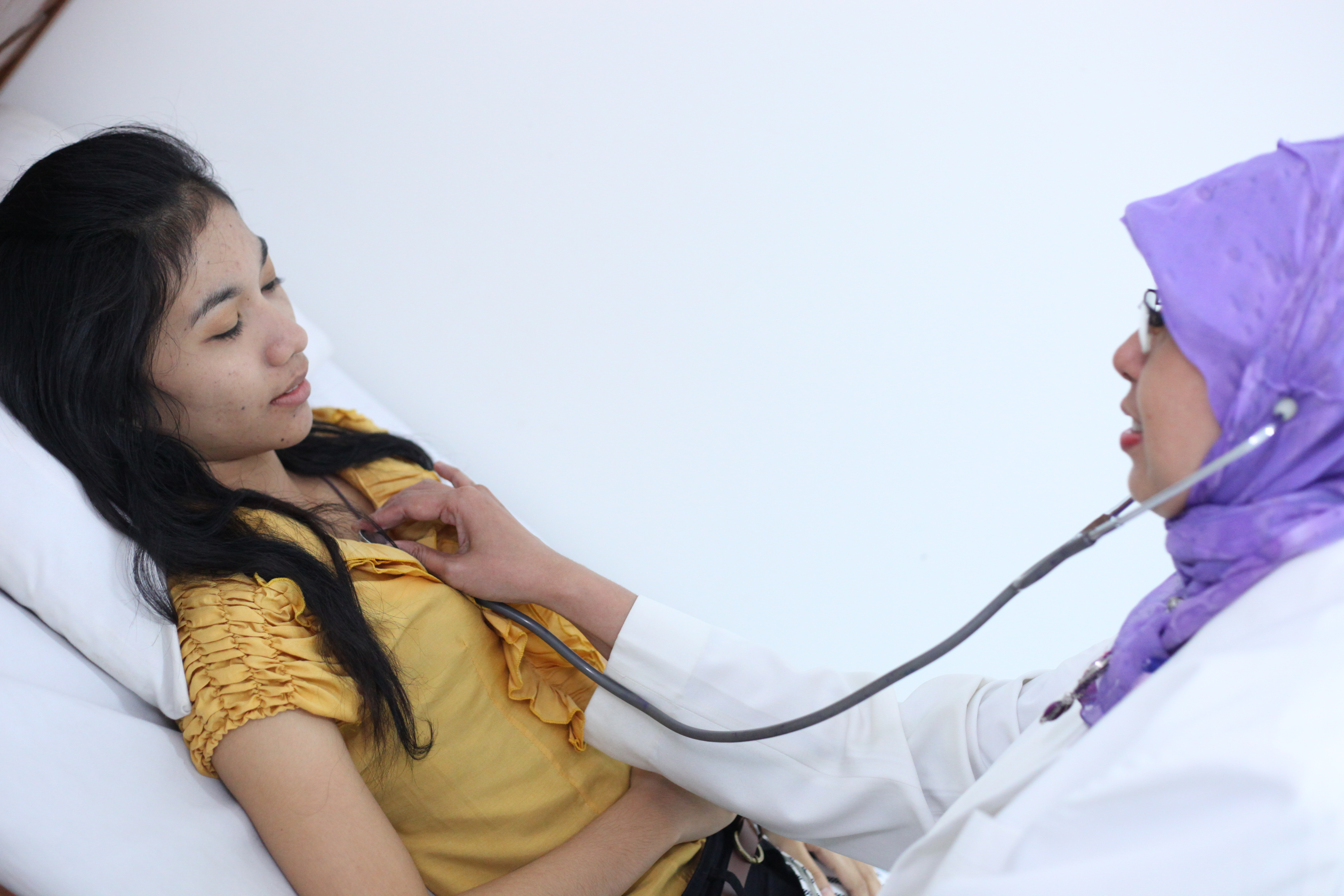
Physician Health Services

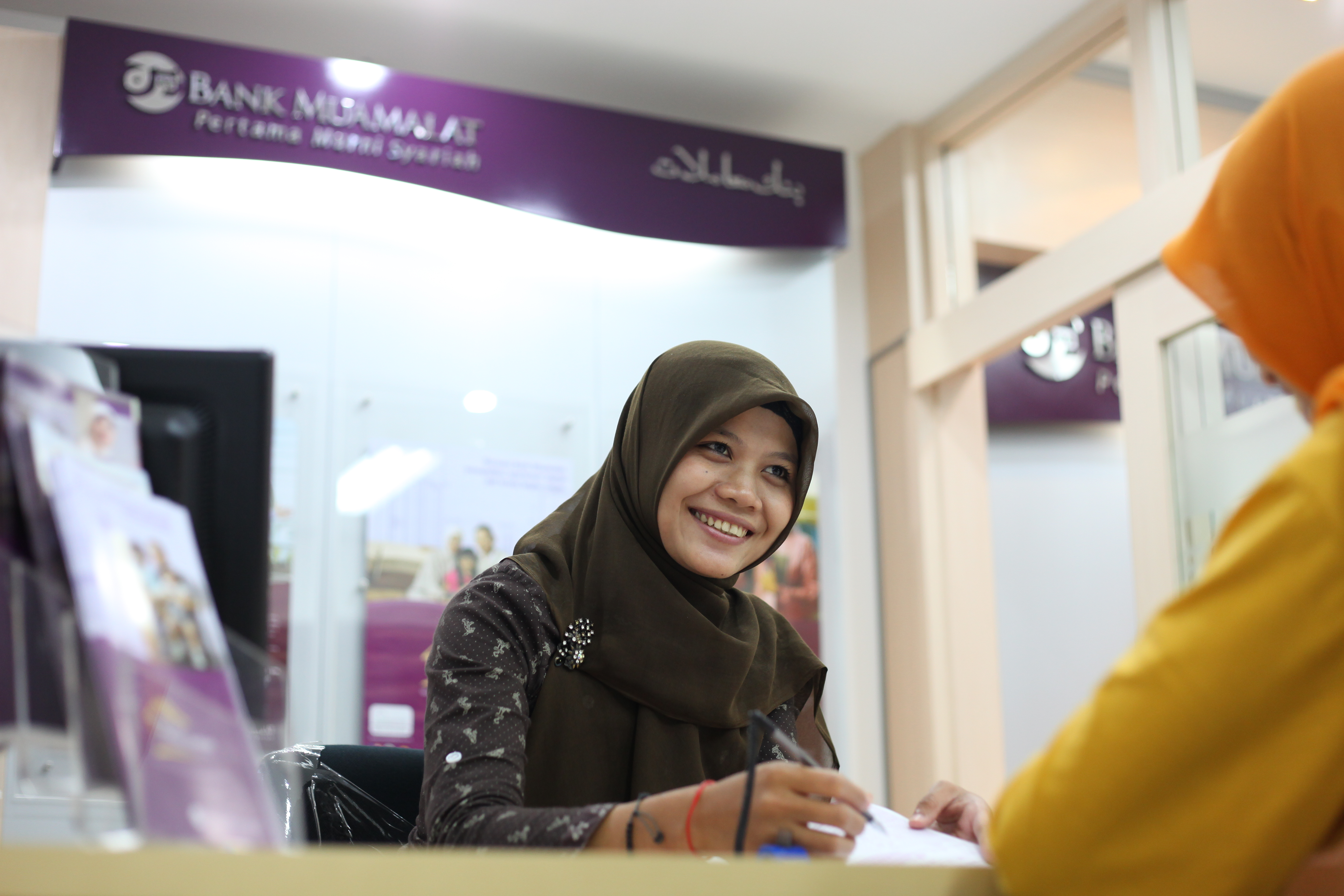
Muamalat Bank Services

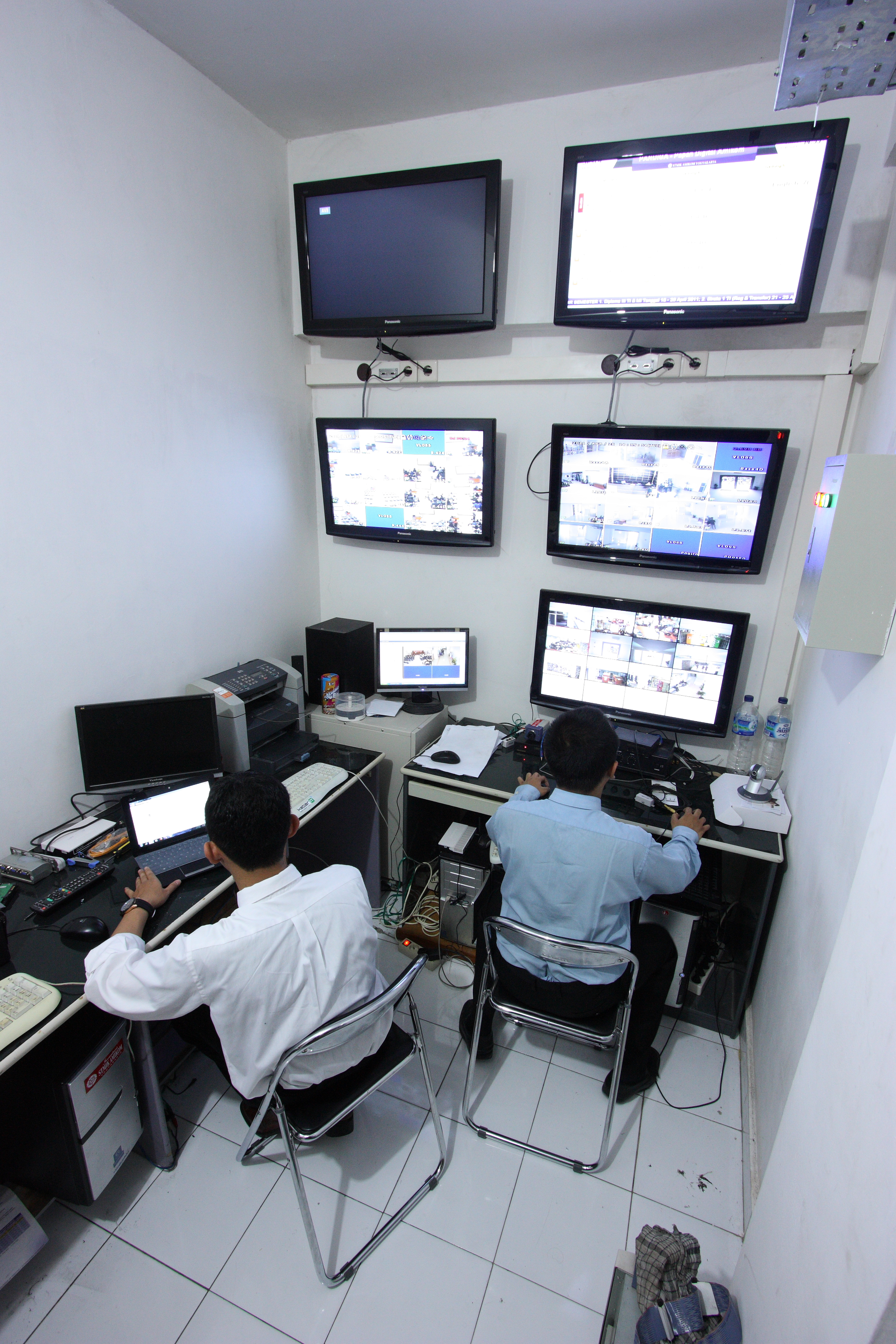
CCTV Room 01

In 2010 Unit V was constructed for the library, classroom theory, and business incubator space. In 2012 Amikom Student Center was built to provide space for student activities, secretarial student organisations, meeting rooms, a special meeting of student activities and space for Pembina Foundation. In 2013 Unit VI was built to house International class lectures, faculty room, research institutes, Quality Assurance, Office of International Affairs, Film Animation production rooms, and theatres. This building has been equipped with a basement, 2 floors and an elevator.

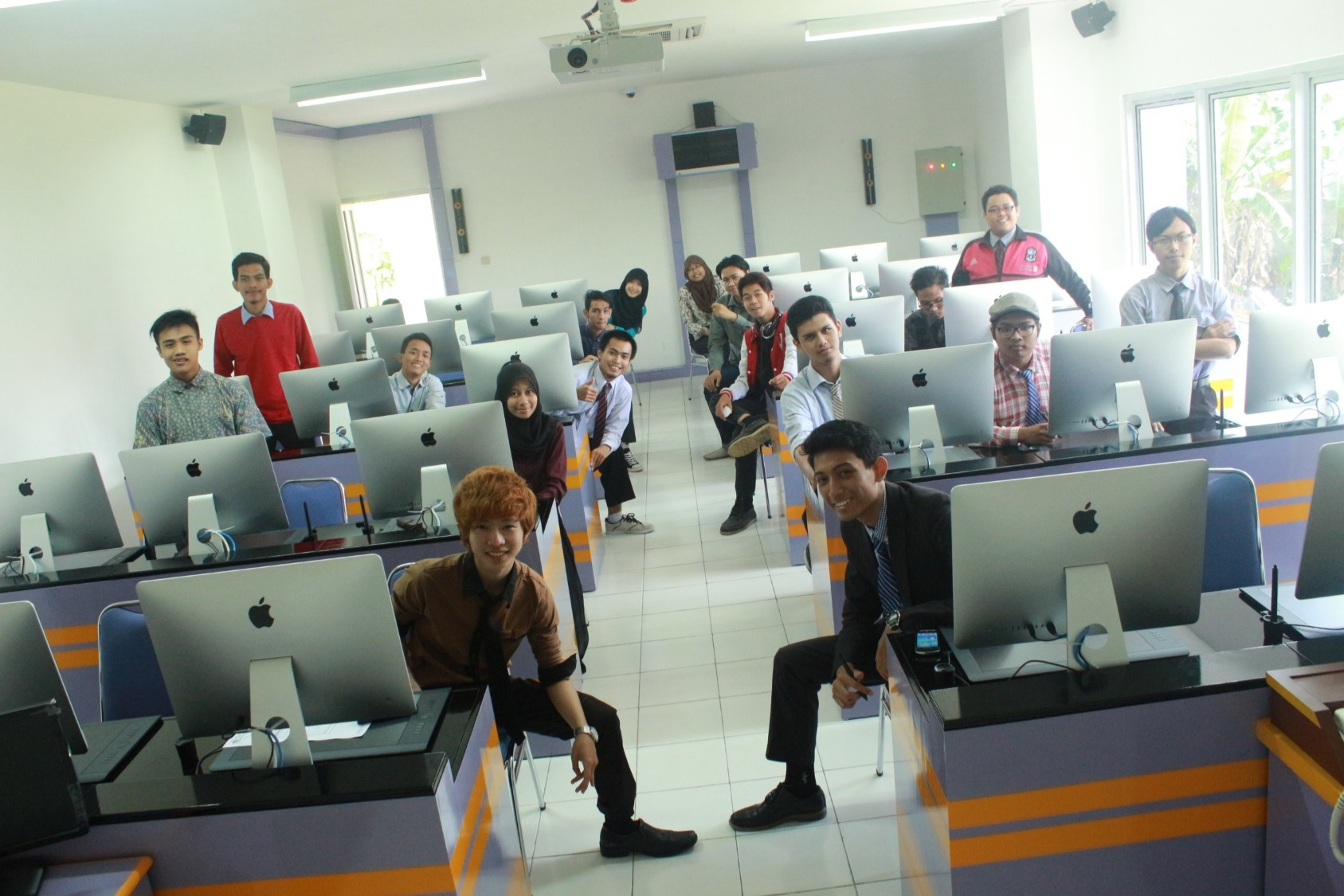
International Class Lab

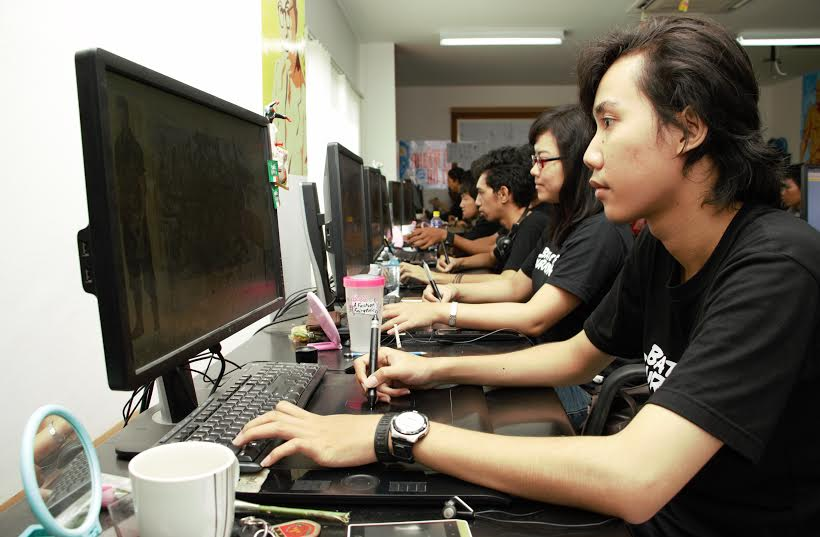
Animation Studio-MSV Pictures

== UNESCO Report 2009 ==
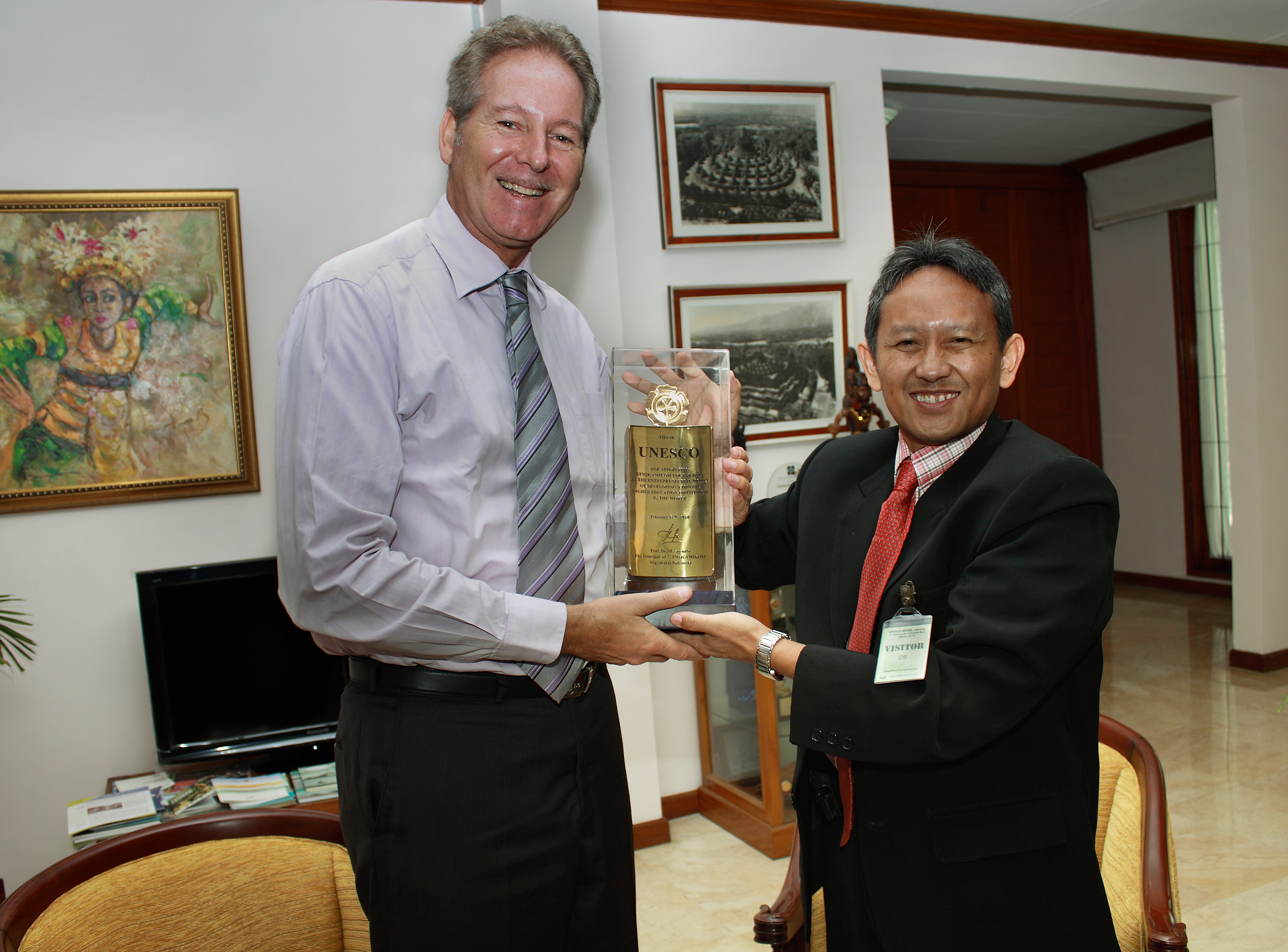
Thanks to UNESCO

In the annual report UNESCO 2009 - presented in World Conference on Higher Education 2009, the report A New Dynamic: Private Higher Education STMIK AMIKOM was mentioned as a private university in Yogyakarta, Indonesia.

== Organizational structure ==
Member of Foundation AMIKOM Yogyakarta

- Chief manager of the Foundation Dr. Muhammad Idris Purwanto, MM.
- Foundation Treasurer Business Ir. Rum M. Andri KR. M.Kom.
- Foundation Secretary Business Rahma Widyawati, SE, MM.

Administrative employees
Position	Name
Rector	: Prof. Dr. Mohammad Suyanto, MM.
Vice Rector for Academic Affairs	: Drs. Bambang Sudaryatno, MM.
Vice Rector for General and Financial Administration Planning	: Eny Nurnilawaty, SE., MM.
Vice Rector for Student and Alumni	: Dr. Ahmad Fauzi, SE., MM.
Vice Rector for Cooperation and Development	: Dr. Arief Setyanto, S.Si., MT.
Dean of Faculty of Computer Science	: Krisnawati, S.Si., MT.
Chairman of the Department of Informatics (undergraduate)	: Sudarmawan, MT.
Chairman of the Department of Information Systems (undergraduate)	: Krisnawati, S.Si., MT.
Chairman of the Department of Computer Engineering (undergraduate)	: Melwin Syafrizal, S.Kom., M.Eng.
Chairman of the Department of Information Technology (undergraduate)	: Hanif Al Fatta, M.Kom.
Chairman of the Department of Informatics (Diploma)	: Melwin Syafrizal, S.Kom., M.Eng.
Chairman of the Department of Information Management (Diploma)	: Hanif Al Fatta, M.Kom.
Dean of Faculty Science and Technology	: Sudarmawan, MT.
Chairman of the Department of Architecture (undergraduate)	: Amir Fattah Sofyan, ST., M.Kom.
Chairman of the Department of Geography (undergraduate)	: Kusnawi, S.Kom, M.Eng.
Chairman of the Department of Regional and City Planning (undergraduate)	: Emha Taufik Luthfi, ST., M.Kom.
Dean of Faculty Economics and Social Sciences (undergraduate)	: Emha Taufik Luthfi, ST., M.Kom.
Chairman of the Department of Entrepreneurship (undergraduate)	: Suyatmi, S.E., M.M
Chairman of the Department of Economics (undergraduate)	: Anik Sri Widawati, S.Sos., M.M.
Chairman of the Department of Accounting (undergraduate)	: Widiyanti Kurnianingsih, SE, Ak M.Akt, CA.
Chairman of the Department of International Relations (undergraduate)	: Tahajudin Sudibyo, Drs. M.A
Chairman of the Department of Department of Public Administration	: Anik Sri Widawati, S.Sos., M.M.
Chairman of the Department of Department of Communication Studies	: Erik Hadi Saputra, S.Kom, M.Eng.
Director of PostGraduate Program	: Dr. Kusrini, M.Kom.
Head of Quality Assurance Center	: M. Rudianto Arief, MT.
Head of Secretarial Section	: Anik Sri Widawati, S.Sos., M.M.
Head of Technical Services Unit	: Tristanto Ari Aji, M.Kom.
Director of Research Department	: Dr. Abidarin Rosidi, M.Ma.
Director of Community Service Department	: Heri Sismoro, M.Kom.
Director of the Financial Planning Directorate	: Widiyanti Kurnianingsih, SE, Ak M.Akt, CA.
Director of Academic and Student Affairs Directorate	: Armadyah Amborowaty, S.Kom., M.Eng.
Director of the Human Resources Directorate	: Istiningsih, SE, MM.
Director of the Innovation Center Directorate	: Drs. Asro Nasiri, M.Kom.
Director of the Public Relation and International Affairs Directorate	: Erik Hadi Saputra, S.Kom, M.Eng.
Director of the Business Placement Center Directorate	: Kusnawi, S.Kom, M.Eng.
Director of the Student Affairs Directorate	: Suyatmi, S.E., M.M.
Director of the Facilities and infrastructure Directorate	: R. Muhammad Maskuri, S.Sos.I, MM.

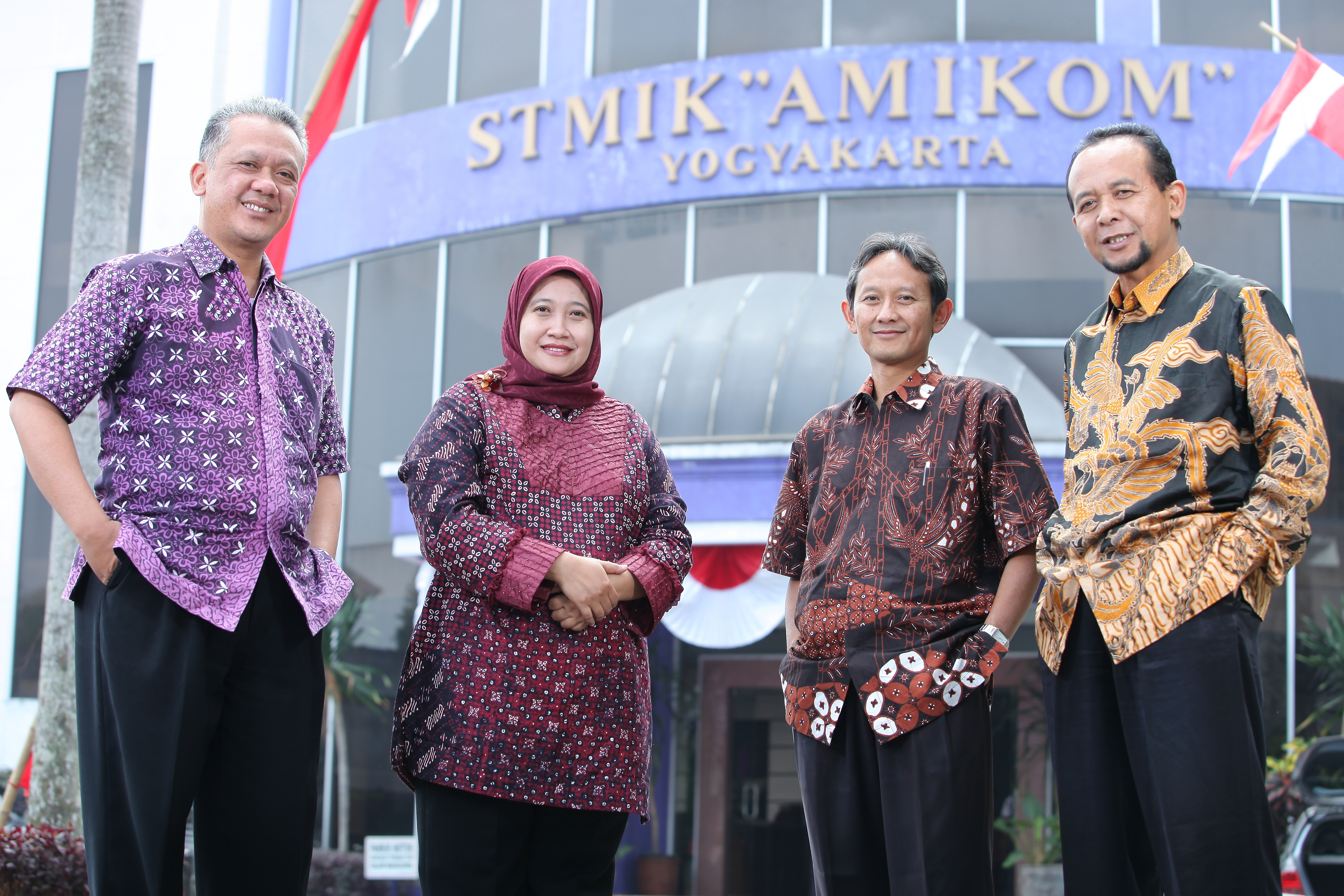
Leader of college

== Faculties ==
The University of AMIKOM Yogyakarta has 3 faculties and provides 3 levels of education: Diploma, Undergraduate and Post Graduate.

=== Faculty of Computer Science ===
- Magister of Informatics (Postgraduate Programme)
- Department of Informatics (Undergraduate Programme) - Regular Class and International Class
- Department of Information Systems for bachelor's degree (Undergraduate Programme) - Regular Class and International Class
- Department of Information Technology for bachelor's degree (Undergraduate Programme) - Regular Class and International Class
- Department of Computer Engineering for bachelor's degree (Undergraduate Programme) - Regular Class and International Class
- Department of Information Management (Diploma Programme)
- Department of Informatics Engineering (Diploma Programme)

=== Faculty Science and Technology ===
- Department of Architecture (Undergraduate Programme)
- Department of Geography (Undergraduate Programme)
- Department of Regional and City Planning (Undergraduate Programme)

=== Faculty Economics and Social Sciences ===
- Department of Entrepreneurship (Undergraduate Programme)
- Department of Economics (Undergraduate Programme)
- Department of Accounting (Undergraduate Programme)
- Department of International Relations (Undergraduate Programme)
- Department of Public Administration (Undergraduate Programme)
- Department of Communication Studies (Undergraduate Programme

== Concentration ==
1. Magister of Informatics (Postgraduate Program) concentrations:

- Chief Information Officer Management
- Information System
- Digital Media Technology
- Animations

2. Department of Informatics (undergraduate) concentrations:

1. Multimedia
2. Programming
3. Computer Networks

3. Department of Information Systems (undergraduate) concentrations:

- Creative Multimedia (TV Commercial, Movie, Company Profile, Learning Media)
- Developer Accounting Information System
- E-Commerce System Developer
- Financial Technology

4. Department of Computer Engineering (undergraduate) concentrations:

- Cybersecurity
- IoT

5. Department of Information Technology (undergraduate) concentrations:

- Animations 2D & 3D
- Game Development

6. Information Management (diploma). Has three concentrations, namely:

- Development of Desktop-Based Information Systems
- Development of Web-Based Information System
- Development of Multimedia-Based Information System

7. Informatics Engineering (diploma) concentrations:

- Web Development
- Computer Network
- Animations 2D

=== Faculty Science and Technology ===
8. Department of Architecture (undergraduate) concentrations:

- Digital Architecture

9. Department of Geography (undergraduate) concentrations:

- GeoInformatics
- Geographic Information System
- Documentary Film

10. Department of Regional and City Planning (undergraduate) concentrations:

- Smart City

=== Faculty Economics and Social Sciences ===
11. Department of Entrepreneurship (undergraduate)

- Digital Entrepreneur
- Business consultant
- Business Motivator
- Business Developers

12. Department of Economics (undergraduate) concentrations:

- Creative Economy
- Digital Economics
- Business Economics and Banking
- Islamic Economics
- Tourism Economics

13. Department of Accounting (undergraduate) concentrations:

- Auditing
- Taxation
- Management and Business Accounting

14. Department of International Relations (undergraduate) concentrations:

- International Business
- International Diplomacy
- Political-Economy Global
- Politics and International Security
- Politics-Law International

15. Department of Public Administration (undergraduate) concentrations:

- Digital Governance
- Local Governance
- Sociopreneurship
- 16. Department of Communication Studies (undergraduate) concentrations:
1. Marketing
2. Broadcasting
3. Cinema
4. Visual Design
