= Aryanto Yuniawan =

Indonesian film director (born 1977)

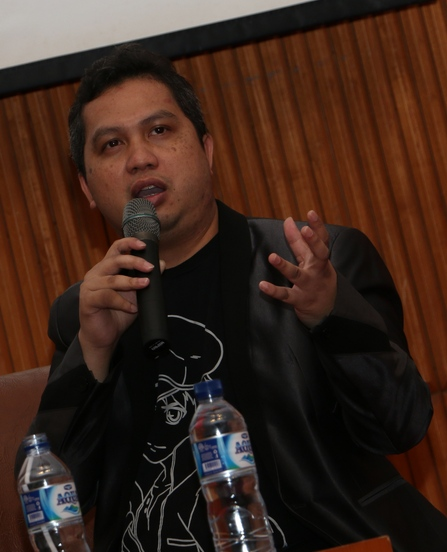
- Born: June 18, 1977 (age 47); Magelang, Indonesia
- Occupations: CEO; Film Director
- Years active: 2002–present

Aryanto Yuniawan (born June 18, 1977 in Magelang) is Chief Executive Officer of PT Mataram Surya Visi Sinema, a multimedia and animation movie company located in Yogyakarta, Indonesia. Ary (his nickname) is best known as a director of Battle of Surabaya, the first 2D animation movie in Indonesia which got some awards i.e. Gold Remi Award USA 2016, GrandPrize Winner of SICAF 2016 in South Korea, Winner of Nice International Filmmaker Festival 2017 in France, Winner of Nioda International Film Festival in India and others. He is also acclaimed as a writer, a producer, and currently working on several articles and books related to his job and hobby. He started his career from directing and producing independent animation films including music videos. He was trusted to be one of the juries of several film festivals such as Festival Film Indonesia (FFI 2016), Noida International Film Festival (NIFF 2016), and Seoul International Cartoon and Animation Festival (SICAF 2017).

Aryanto Yuniawan was chosen to be an individual recipient of the National Intellectual Property Award 2016 from the Directorate General of Intellectual Property, Ministry of Justice and Human Rights, Republic of Indonesia (DJKI Kemenkumham RI). The award was submitted by Vice-president of the Republic of Indonesia (Vice-president), M. Jusuf Kalla to him with eight other recipients.

== Education ==
Aryanto was born in Magelang, Central Java, Indonesia. He is the oldest of two siblings. After finishing the middle school from SMPN 2 Magelang and highschool from SMAN 1 Magelang, he studied at STMIK Amikom (now University Amikom) in Diploma degree. He gained his bachelor of computer science then and completed his master in the same university in 2017.

== Filmography ==
=== As director ===
- Battle of Surabaya (2015)
- The Profesional (2012)
- Petualangan Abdan (2011)
- Goodbye World (2010)
- Lestari (2010)
- The Letter of Heaven (2010)
- Jatayu (2009)
- Lembah Halilintar (2009)

== Achievements ==
=== Career ===
- Lecturer at STMIK AMIKOM Yogyakarta
- General manager of PT Mataram Surya Visi Pictures (2003-2014)
- Chief executive Officer of PT Mataram Surya Visi Sinema (2014–Present)

=== Awards ===
- Best Animation. The International Filmmaker Festival of World Cinema. 2017. Nice, France.
- Gold Remi Award. Houston International Film Festival. 2016. Houston, Texas.
- Grand Prize. Seoul International Cartoon and Animation Festival. 2016. Seoul, Korea.
- Best Animation. Noida International Film Festival. 2016. New Delhi, India.
- Winner of People's Choice Award. International Movie Trailer Festival. 2013. California, Amerika Serikat.
- Official Selection. Holland Animation Film Festival. 2016. Utrecht, Belanda.
- Official Selection. Dingle International Film Festival. 2016. Dublin, Irlandia.
- Official Selection. Fantoche Internasional Animation Festival Film. 2016. Baden, Swiss.
- Special Screening. Athena Animfest. 2016. Athena, Yunani.
- Special Screening. New Chitose Internasional Animation Festival. 2016. Hokkaido, Jepang.
- Nominee of Best Foreign Animation Trailer. Annual Golden Trailer Award. 2014. California, Amerika Serikat.
- Nominee of Apresiasi Film Indonesia. Art and Film Board of Ministry of Culture & Education. 2012. Jakarta, Indonesia.
- First Winner of Indigo Fellowship Category. PT Telekomunikasi Indonesia. 2012. Jakarta, Indonesia.
- Winner of ICT Award Category. Digital Animation Inaicta. Minister for Communication and Information Technology. 2012. Jakarta, Indonesia.
- Nominee of Animafest 2D Short Animated Film MNCTV. (Briptu Dorman). 2011. Jakarta, Indonesia.
- Second Winner of Digital Animation (The Adventure of Abdan – Honesty). Exhibition of Indonesian Production. Minister of Industry Republic of Indonesia. 2009. Jakarta, Indonesia.
- Nominasi International Urbanimation. (The Adventure of Abdan – Kites). 2008. Jakarta, Indonesia.
- Merit Winner ICT Award Category. Digital Animation Inaicta. Minister for Communication and Information Technology. 2000. Jakarta, Indonesia.
