= Catherine Dwyer =

Catherine Dwyer or Kathryn Dwyer may refer to:

- Catherine Dwyer (filmmaker), Australian writer and director of the feature documentary Brazen Hussies
- Catherine Winifred Dwyer, Australian educator and suffragist
- Kathryn Dwyer Sullivan, American geologist
