= Brazen Hussies =

Australian Women's Liberation documentary

- Film poster, featuring art by Lin Tobias and a photo of the 1975 International Women's Day March in Sydney
- Directed by: Catherine Dwyer
- Written by: Catherine Dwyer
- Produced by: Philippa Campey, Andrea Foxworthy
- Cinematography: Anna Howard, Erika Addis, Sky Davis
- Edited by: Rosie Jones
- Music by: Amanda Brown
- Animation by: Juliet Miranda Rowe
- Production companies: Film Camp Pty Ltd; Brazen Hussies Film Pty Ltd
- Distributed by: Film Art Media
- Release dates: 3 October 2020 (Brisbane); 7 November 2020
- Running time: 90 minutes
- Country: Australia

Brazen Hussies is a 2020 Australian documentary feature film recording the early period of second-wave feminism in Australia, charting the history of the Women's Liberation Movement in Australia, from 1965 to 1975. It was accompanied by the release of an album featuring songs from the film along with others, titled Brazen Hussies - Songs from the Film - and More.

== Synopsis ==
The film covers the evolution of second-wave feminism in Australia in its early days, from 1965 until 1975. ending with International Women's Year in 1975.

The film begins with footage of Merle Thornton and Rosalie Bognor chaining themselves to a pub counter rail at the Regatta Hotel in Brisbane. Thornton's daughter, actor Sigrid Thornton, then aged 12, is seen waving a women's liberation flag with her mum. It goes on to cover reforms under the Whitlam government; equal pay amendments to legislation; the first women's shelters and rape crisis centres; and new income support for single parents. It shows the fight by women to attain some of the legislative and societal changes, including chaining themselves to buildings as well as being beaten up by police and members of the public. Along with the archival footage are interlaced interviews with prominent feminists such as Anne Summers, Pat O'Shane, Elizabeth Reid, and Eva Cox. The movement coincided with the anti-Vietnam war movement, the anti-apartheid movement, and the film includes footage taken by ASIO.

== Production ==
It is Catherine Dwyer's first film as director and Sue Maslin was executive producer. Maslin later said that the filmmakers had great difficulty in getting it financed.

Dwyer previously worked on Mary Dore's documentary She's Beautiful When She's Angry (2014), as associate producer, researcher and assistant editor. This film focused on the Women's Liberation Movement in the United States.

The film was so named because the women's movement had reclaimed the formerly pejorative term, wearing it as a "badge of honour".

Some of the footage used in the film was sourced from the National Film and Sound Archive.

=== Music ===
An accompanying compilation album titled Brazen Hussies - Songs from the Film - and More was released on 6 November 2020. Tracks included "Intoxicated", by 1980s Melbourne women's punk band Toxic Shock, sung by (later journalist and radio presenter) Fran Kelly and others.

The full track list is as follows:

- Toxic Shock – "Intoxicated" (1981)
- Judy Small – "To Be A Woman"
- Hens' Teeth – "Keep On"
- Stray Dags – "Self Attack" (1981)
- Clitoris Band – "Mother Who's That Man?"
- Natasha Koodravsev – "Women Break-Out"
- Pip Porter – "Between Women"
- Jan Cornall & Elizabeth Drake – "Better Than Het"
- The Ovarian Sisters – "The I.P.D."
- Lavender Blues – "Lesbian Nation"
- Foreign Body – "Nothing Yet"
- Jen Short – "Witch Song"
- Robyn Archer – "That Good Old Double Standard"
- Glen Tomasetti – "Woman Is Moving"

=== Poster art ===
The film poster, which was also used for the album, included art created by Lin Tobias and a photo taken by Anne Roberts of the 1975 International Women's Day March in Sydney.

== Release ==
Following screenings at both the Brisbane International Film Festival and the Adelaide Film Festival, Brazen Hussies was released in cinemas on 7 November 2020, on 56 screens across Australia, lasting for three months on the big screen.

In December 2025, the National Film and Sound Archive gave a screening accompanied by a Q&A with Dwyer and Elizabeth Reid.

Brazen Hussies was released on ABC iview for a limited period from October to November 2020, on the 50th anniversary of Whitlam's dismissal.

== Reception and accolades ==
In a review in The Guardian, Kath Kenny wrote: "Dwyer has uncovered terrific archival footage and photos to complement contemporary interviews".

Sally Breen, a senior lecturer at Griffith University, writing for The Conversation, wrote that the film is: "A celebration of how far we’ve come and a warning of just how easily everything these women fought for could be lost."

Brazen Hussies was nominated for the best documentary award at the 10th AACTA Awards.

Johnny Milner of the NFSA wrote: "We also realise that this movement has not only changed the way many women see themselves, but also the way men see women. Brazen Hussies is an important historical document to be watched and celebrated by all genders".

== See also ==
- Women of Steel (2020), a documentary film by Robynne Murphy about the 1980s Jobs for Women campaign
