= Brazen Hussies (disambiguation) =

Brazen Hussies is a 2020 Australian documentary film.

Brazen Hussies may also refer to:

- Brazen Hussies, a 1996 British television film featuring Barbara Durkin and Julie Walters
- The Brazen Hussies, an American science fiction writers' group comprising Pat Murphy, Lisa Goldstein, and Michaela Roessner
