= St Dominic's Priory College, Adelaide =

St Dominic's Priory College

Location
- North Adelaide, South Australia; Australia
- Coordinates: 34°54′32″S 138°35′09″E

Information
- Type: Independent, single-sex, day school
- Motto: Latin: Veritas (Truth)
- Religious affiliation: Dominican Order
- Denomination: Roman Catholicism
- Established: 1884; 142 years ago
- Principal: Dr Helen Steele
- Gender: Girls
- Enrolment: ~680
- Colours: Black and white
- Website: www.stdominics.sa.edu.au

St Dominic's Priory College is a Roman Catholic, independent, day, Reception to Year 12 Catholic Girls School located on Molesworth Street in North Adelaide, South Australia.

== Overview ==
The college is one of the earliest Dominican schools, established in 1883 by a group of Dominican Sisters who came to North Adelaide from Stone in Staffordshire, the foundress being Rose Columba Adams. Today the college caters for approximately 680 students.

== Notable alumnae ==
- Fran Kelly – radio presenter, current affairs journalist and political correspondent on ABC Radio National

== See also ==
- List of schools in South Australia
- Catholic education in Australia
