= Elizabeth Anne Reid =

Australian feminist and academic (born 1942)

Elizabeth Reid AO FASSA
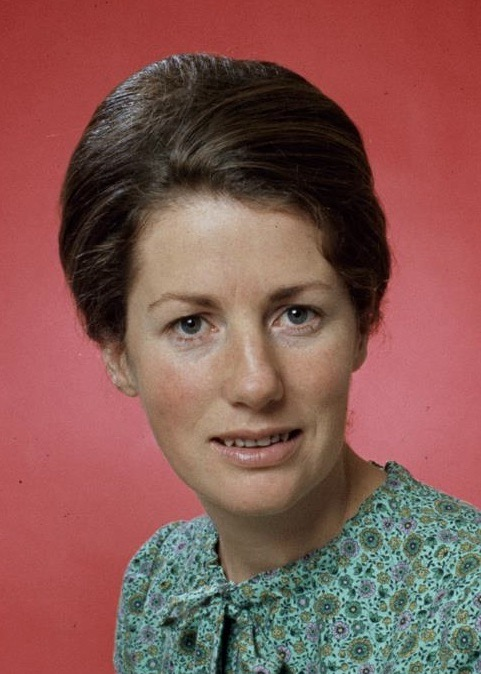
- Reid in 1973
- Born: 3 July 1942 (age 84); Taree, New South Wales, Australia
- Education: Australian National University (BA); Somerville College, Oxford (BPhil)
- Awards: Order of Australia

Elizabeth Anne Reid AO FASSA (born 3 July 1942) is an Australian development practitioner, feminist, and academic. She has had a distinguished career in and made significant contributions to national and international public service, including in Iran, Papua New Guinea, and various African countries. She is known for her development work and advocacy in the area of HIV/AIDS, both at home and abroad. Reid was appointed the world's first adviser on women's affairs to a head of government by the Australian Labor government of Gough Whitlam in 1973, during a period in which she was known for her advocacy of women's issues in Australia. She later founded, established, and worked with a number of pioneering and specialised United Nations institutions, government agencies, and non-governmental organisations. She retired from field work in 2015. The Elizabeth Reid Network (ERN) was established in 2016, with the aim of supporting women advisers in the Labor Party to participate in the political process.

== Early life and education ==
Elizabeth Anne Reid was born on 3 July 1942 in Taree, New South Wales, the daughter of Jim and Jean Reid, both teachers, and both members of the Australian Labor Party. She had five siblings, the three youngest ones being born in Canberra, when her father was teaching at Canberra High School.

She first attended St Felix Catholic Primary School Bankstown (western Sydney), followed by St Christopher's School in Canberra.

Aged 18, after matriculating from Canberra High School, Reid became a cadet in the Australian Bureau of Statistics, the only woman in a new scheme to train future statisticians in the Bureau.

She began her studies at the Australian National University (ANU) and became an editor on the student newspaper, Woroni, and became active in student politics. She suffered head injuries in a train accident in her first year, leading to advice to learn to knit and give up studying statistics and pure mathematics. However, instead, she continued studying, in 1961 teaching herself Fortran and becoming the first operator and programmer for ANU's new IBM 1620. From 1964 to 1966 she was a computer programmer and training officer.

She went on to complete a Bachelor of Arts with First Class Honours at ANU in 1965. She was National Undergraduate Scholar, and the recipient of ANU's Tillyard Prize.

Reid was awarded a Commonwealth Travelling Scholarship and completed a Bachelor of Philosophy at Somerville College of the University of Oxford in 1970.

== Career ==
=== Academia ===
After completing her studies in England, Reid returned to Australia and worked as a senior tutor in the Department of Philosophy at ANU from 1970 to 1973. She became active in the Women's Movement and in particular the Women's Electoral Lobby, which formed in 1972.

During 1976, Reid was a Fellow at the Harvard Institute of Politics and the John F. Kennedy School of Government at Harvard University. She was the first female fellow, and the first from outside the US, to hold such a fellowship.

In 2001 she was appointed visiting fellow at the Gender Relations Centre and the School of International, Political and Strategic Studies of the College of Asia and the Pacific at ANU, during which time she undertook much research. As of 2011 and 2013, she was Visiting Fellow, State, Society & Governance in Melanesia Program, School of International, Political & Strategic Studies at ANU.

=== Politics (1973–1975) ===
In 1973, Reid was appointed the world's first adviser on women's affairs to a head of government by the Whitlam government, having felt a "moral obligation" to apply for the role. The Women's Electoral Lobby had been founded in the previous year, which helped Whitlam to win the election. She won the position against a field of 400 applicants, with Anne Summers, Lyndall Ryan, and Eva Cox on the shortlist. Reid was an unconventional choice, as an activist and philosopher, and had to put up with sensationalist and sexist coverage of her appointment. She was active in the women's movement in Australia at the time, and (later described as "an idealistic pragmatist") brought women's needs and perspectives to government. She was focused both on improving things like childcare, women's health services, and protection from violence against women, as well as cultural change, that would give women more opportunities in life. She later described herself as "a revolutionary in a reformist job".

In both of these areas, her achievements were significant: the government took a greater role in the protection of women and increasing their rights; and, through the 1974 establishment and later recommendations of a Royal Commission on Human Relationships, a feminist reform agenda was put on the agenda for future action by the government. One of the results of this was an "impact on women" statement being attached to all government submissions in the Hawke government in the following decade. She was the driving force behind the granting of three months' paid maternity leave, along with a week's paid paternity leave, for public servants, and the Supporting Mother's Benefit for single mothers, both in 1973.

Reid was convenor of the Australian National Advisory Committee for International Women's Year (IWY), and was both leader of the Australian delegation to, and vice-chairman of, the Preparatory United Nations Consultative Committee for IWY, in New York City in March 1975. She also led the Australian delegation to the World Conference of the International Women's Year in Mexico City in June 1975. At home, she secured funding for promoting and celebrating IWY, which led to accusations of extravagant governmental spending, particularly aimed at her. The Women and Politics Conference, attended by around 800 women, was, according to Reid later, "rowdy, enlightening, uncomfortable, and highly productive", but received negative press coverage, which talked of squabbling and vandalism.

Reid was, during her time in the position as women's adviser, in her own words, "demeaned, parodied, insulted, belittled, patronised, judged, cartooned, lampooned – and more – by the press". Men in Whitlam's office told him that she was a political liability. After being asked to move out of the Prime Minister's Office and instead lead a women's section in the public service, she resigned instead.

=== Development work ===
After leaving her role in government, Reid left the country, feeling like a "political exile". She first went to New York City, where she was invited by Princess Ashraf Pahlavi (twin sister of the Shah of Iran) to work with her in Iran. In this role, she was responsible for ensuring that decisions taken by the 1975 Mexico International Women's Conference were implemented, and for establishing an Asia and Pacific Centre for Women and Development in Tehran. She was based in Tehran until 1979 (when the Shah's rule was overturned), but travelled to the Pacific region often during these years.

She performed many roles in the areas of international development and women's rights for the United Nations and other bodies, including as director and policy adviser of the United Nations Development Program from 1989 to 1998. Her development work took her to the Caribbean nations, Africa, Asia, Central America, and Eastern Europe. From 1981 onwards, Reid worked on a number of development and health programs, including many concerned with HIV/AIDS, in Bangkok, Zaire, Burundi, Rwanda, New York, Canberra, and Papua New Guinea.

Reid had a long career with the UN, including milestones such as founding director of the United Nations Asian and Pacific Centre for Women and Development in Tehran, Iran, from 1977 to 1979; director and policy adviser of the United Nations Development Program from 1989 to 1998, which included being director of the United Nations Development Programme Division for Women in Development from 1989 to 1991 and founding director of the United Nations Development Programme HIV and Development Program in New York from 1992 to 1997. She was principal officer of the UN Secretariat for the 1980 World Conference of the Decade for Women, and also directed the UN's HIV program in New York.

She formally resigned from the UN in 2000, returning to Australia in that year, but continued to do most of her work in developing countries for the following 15 years. She did consultancy work relating to HIV, and research as part of a role as visiting fellow at ANU's Gender Relations Centre and the School of International, Political and Strategic Studies in the College of Asia and the Pacific. She worked as an adviser and administrator and did extensive research on topics related to women and development for a variety of bodies.

As part of her work with Collaboration for Health in Papua New Guinea and the ANU Gender Relations Centre, in 2002 Reid convened and chaired an International Roundtable on Increasing Access to HIV Care and Treatment in Resource Poor Settings. From 2003, Reid was senior adviser to the Collaboration for Health in Papua New Guinea (CHPNG), a public-private partnership, which is ongoing as of 2025.

Reid retired from field work in 2015, when symptoms of Parkinson's disease forced her to return to Australia.

== Activism and other activities ==
Reid was an active member of Canberra Women's Liberation during her time as tutor at ANU, and was a key figure in the women's movement in Australia.

On 7 March 2017, Reid gave the keynote address at the ANU Gender Institute symposium, "How the Personal Became Political: Re-assessing Australia's revolutions in gender and sexuality in the 1970s".

== Recognition and impact ==
Reid was elected as a Fellow of the Academy of the Social Sciences in Australia in 1996.

In 2001, Reid was appointed an Officer of the Order of Australia "for service to international relations, particularly through the United Nations Development Program, to the welfare of women, and to HIV/AIDS policy development, both in Australia and internationally".

Also in 2001, Reid was inducted into the Victorian Honour Roll of Women, during the Centenary of Federation.

She is also a fellow of the Australian Institute of International Affairs (FAIIA).

Reid was included in the Signature Quilt project by the National Pioneer Women's Hall of Fame in 2013. This commemorated Australian women who were first in their field, by collecting and patching together their signatures across two quilts. Reid was included because of her role as the first Federal Government adviser to the Prime Minister on women's affairs, as described against her signature patch. One of the quilts is held at the Women's Museum of Australia.

Reid was invited to give an address in the "Landmark Women" series by the Australian National Museum, which she did on 18 October 2013.

She was interviewed for and features in Catherine Dwyer's 2020 documentary feature, Brazen Hussies, and talked about her involvement in the early period of second-wave feminism in Australia at the Q&A session after a screening of the film by the National Film and Sound Archive in December 2020.

The National Library of Australia in Canberra holds a collection of Reid's papers, mostly relating to her period as Special Advisor on Women's Affairs.

In 2016, the Elizabeth Reid Network (ERN) was established as a network for women advisers within the Australian Labor Party, offering support and scholarships. ERN also hosts events and conduct research to help encourage women to participate in the political process.

== Publications ==
Reid has published widely, including the books:

- (with Murray Goot) Women and Voting Studies: Mindless Matrons or Sexist Scientism? (1974)
- (as editor) HIV & AIDS: The Global Inter-Connections (1995)

== Personal life ==
Reid married some time before 1973, but separated. Her daughter, Kathryn Weir (born while Reid was studying in Oxford), lived with her father as a young child. Reid, after working abroad for years after 1975, returned to be with Kathryn during her final year at Hawker College in Canberra.

Reid's second husband, Bill, whom she met in 1980, drew her into working with HIV. After their marriage, they moved to Zaire, where Bill had been appointed director of the US Peace Corps, in the middle of the HIV epidemic sweeping Africa. He was previously director of the African Studies Program at Kalamazoo College in Michigan. Bill, who lived with haemophilia, received blood transfusions after being evacuated first to Johannesburg. After a period in Washington, D.C., they returned to Zaire with their baby son, John, who had been born in Canberra. Bill eventually died in Woden Valley Hospital, Canberra, after being moved to Australia in 1986.

Reid was step-mother to Marisa, who had been adopted by Bill, and also cared for many other children as part of an extended family in various countries, in particular the children of Terry, the head of the Kenyan Women's Bureau, who became a friend after meeting in 1978. She took care of an HIV-infected child named "Little Elizabeth" in Nairobi, from 1995, from a distance after leaving Kenya, until Elizabeth's death.

After retiring from field work in 2015, Reid settled in Canberra. In December 2020, Reid revealed that she had advanced Parkinson's disease.
