= Lian Tanner =

Australian writer

- Born: 17 March 1951 (age 75); Tasmania, Australia
- Occupation: Writer
- Writing career
- Period: 2009–present
- Genre: Children's fiction
- Website: liantanner.com.au

Lian Tanner (born 17 March 1951 in Tasmania, Australia) is an Australian children's author who lives in southern Tasmania.

Tanner is the author of the fantasy Keepers trilogy of children's books. Museum of Thieves the first book in the series was published in 2010. It has been published in Australia, the US and India and translated into German, Turkish, Chinese characters, Bahasa Indonesia, Thai, Brazilian Portuguese, Spanish, Polish, Ukrainian, Russian and Bulgarian.

Prior to writing fiction Tanner held a number of jobs including as a teacher in Australia and Papua New Guinea. She has also worked as a journalist, editor and an actor. Tanner was in the feminist folk band The Ovarian Sisters in the 1970s and 80s.

== Awards ==
Tanner's book Museum of Thieves attracted a number of accolades. It won the 2010 Aurealis Award for Best Children's Fiction, was a Notable Book in the 2011 Australian Children's Book of the Year Award and was shortlisted for the 2010 Australian Independent Booksellers' Award and the Australian Speech Pathologists' Award. In addition Museum of Thieves was selected by Bank Street Children's Book Committee as one of the Best Children's Books of the Year. It was one of the "50 Books You Can’t Put Down" in the 2011 Australian "Get Reading!" Campaign, and was named as a "White Raven" by the International Youth Library in Munich.

City of Lies, the second book in the Keepers trilogy, won the 2011 Aurealis Award for Best Children's Fiction. In 2020 Tanner and illustrator Jonathan Bentley won the Patricia Wrightson Prize for Children's Literature at the New South Wales Premier's Literary Awards for Ella and the Ocean. Tanner won the 2021 Children's crime novel Davitt Award for A Clue for Clara.

Spellhound, the first book in the Dragons of Hallow series, won the 2023 Aurealis Award for Best Children's Fiction.

Rita's Revenge won the Russell Prize for Humour Writing for Young People and was shortlisted for both the Patricia Wrightson Prize for Children's Literature and the Davitt Award for Best Children's Novel in 2023.

== Books ==
=== The Keepers ===
- Museum of Thieves (2010)
- City of Lies (2011)
- Path of Beasts (2012)

=== The Hidden ===
- Icebreaker (2013)
- Sunker's Deep (2014)
- Fetcher's Song (2016); published as Battlesong in the United States

=== The Rogues ===
- Accidental Heroes (2017)
- Secret Guardians (2018)
- Haunted Warriors (2019)

=== Dragons of Hallow ===
- Spellhound (2023)
- Fledgewitch (2024)

=== Standalone ===
- Rats! (2009)
- Ella and the Ocean (2019)
- A Clue for Clara (2020)
- Rita's Revenge (2022)
