= The Ovarian Sisters =

Australian feminist folk band

The Ovarian Sisters were an Australian feminist folk band from Tasmania who were active in the 1970s and 1980s.

Members of The Ovarian Sisters were Sue Edmonds (vocals, banjo, guitar, drums, mouth organ), Lian Tanner (vocals, guitar), Mary Azdajic (violin), Susie Tyson (bass, guitar, mandolin, tambourine), Tina Bain (vocals, mandolin) and Penny Sara (vocals, washboard). Most of the lyrics were written by Sue Edmonds.

The group got together in 1977 and first performed to support a public meeting about abortion rights. The music they first made used British and American songs by artists such as Malvina Reynolds and Pete Seeger and they re-wrote lyrics to based on the messages they wanted to convey. Initially it was more of a collective with many participants.

The group trimmed down to six members in 1979 and their music kept conveying messages but they wrote their own songs. Some lyrics were serious and about subjects like women's refuges, abortion and the Miss Tasmania Quest, some were more celebratory like the song Beat Your Breasts. In 1979 they were part of a parade of 60 women in Hobart celebrating International Women's Day alongside street theatre group Gavina. They released an album in 1980 called Beat Your Breasts. There were very few recording of feminist or political music at the time and this album was welcomed for this reason. Others doing similar work was singer songwriter Robyn Archer and the Old Soft Screw.

They toured a lot in Melbourne and Sydney and played mostly at university campuses. Some people in Tasmania found their music offensive and they got banned from being in the local newspaper. The Sydney Festival in 1981 had a folk music programme where The Ovarian Sisters featured alongside Mary Jane Carpenter and Maree Cunnington under the title The Festival Of Folklife: Beat Your Breasts.

Their song, "The I.P.D.", was part of the soundtrack for the 2020 Australian documentary, Brazen Hussies.
