= Dian HP =

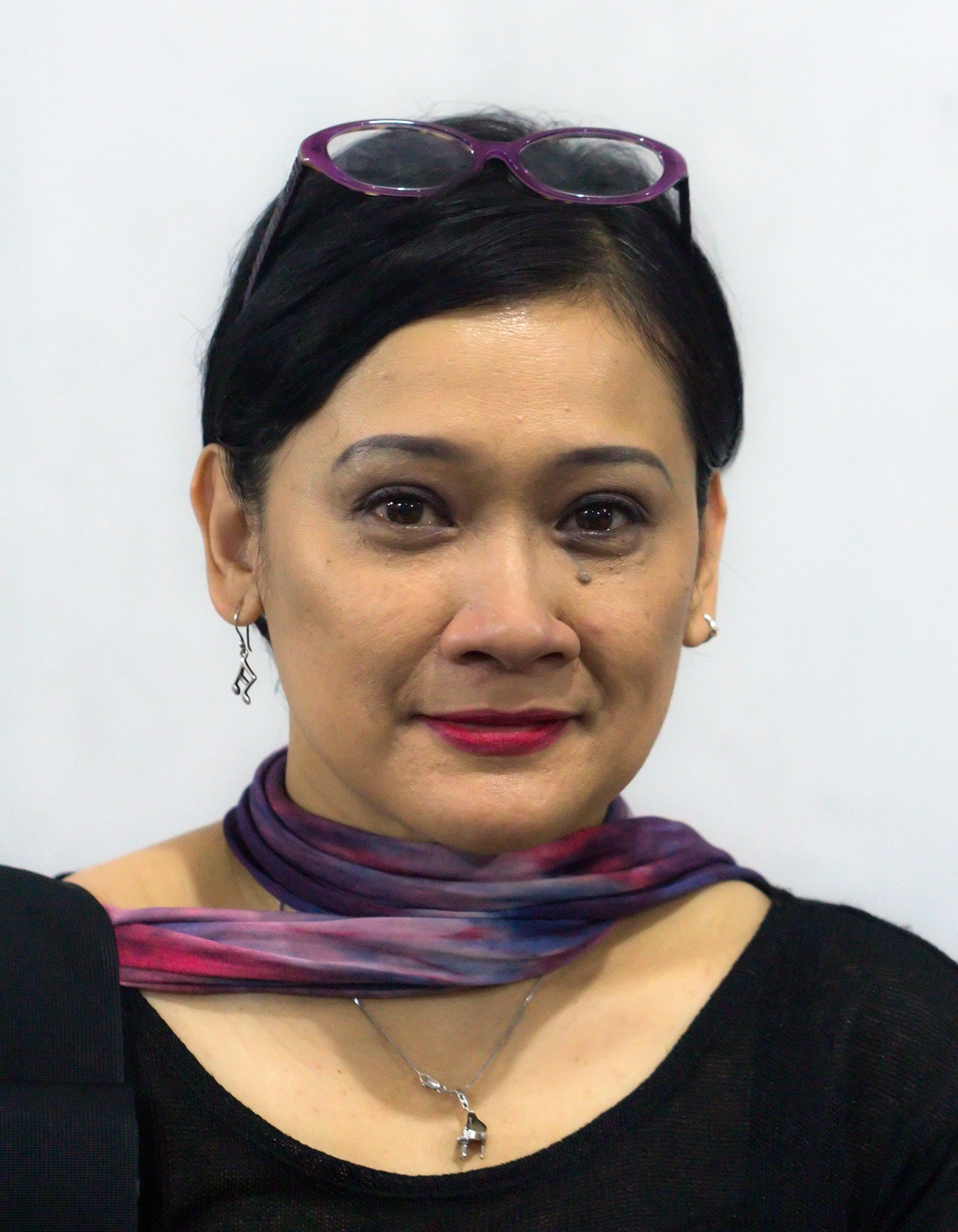
- Dian HP in 2015
- Born: Dian Hadipranowo; 2 August 1965 (age 61); Tunis, Tunisia
- Other name: Dian AGP
- Occupation: Musician
- Musical career
- Origin: Jakarta, Indonesia

Dian Hadipranowo (born 2 August 1965) is a Tunisian-born Indonesian composer and arranger.

== Biography ==
Dian was born in Tunis on 2 August 1965 to a diplomat and his wife. As a toddler, she would eat her meals near the family piano and play her own tunes; she reportedly would not eat unless she was near it. Growing up in Germany, she later studied the piano at the music school in Bad Godesberg, Bonn. Her father would also take her to concerts and other musical venues. However, she also considered becoming a kindergarten teacher.

Dian returned to Indonesia in the late 1970s, soon enrolling at the Jakarta Art Institute; during the same period she taught jazz to Indra Lesmana. By 1984 she was earning a living through music, at times collaborating with Indonesian stars like Fariz RM, Titiek Puspa, and Guruh Soekarnoputra.

In 2003, Dian wrote and produced the music for child singer Tasya's album Istana Pizza (Pizza Palace). The following year, Dian founded the Taman Musik Dian Indonesia, a music school for children with autism and Down syndrome. She had become interested in the work at the age of 16, when her father took her to a school for children with Down syndrome in Germany.

Dian has been involved in several stage musicals, including Guruh Soekarnoputra's Mahadaya Cinta (The Power of Love; 2005) and Kupu-Kupu (Butterfly; 2006), a tribute to Titiek Puspa. In 2010 Dian directed the musical Gita Cinta: The Musical (Love Song: The Musical), an adaptation of Arizal's 1979 film Gita Cinta dari SMA (Love Song From High School); Dian noted that the film was one of her favourites as a child, and that she had thought Rano Karno very handsome. The musical, which required five months of songwriting, was run from 19 to 21 March 2010 at Ismail Marzuki Cultural Centre.

In 2009, Dian formed the band Kumari with singer Trie Utami, her friend of thirty years. Dian and Utami work together to write the songs, which Utami sings. Despite the initial album's title being Kumari untuk Perempuan (Kumari for Women), the duo said that they were not being feminists, as they were asking for men to also help promote women's rights.

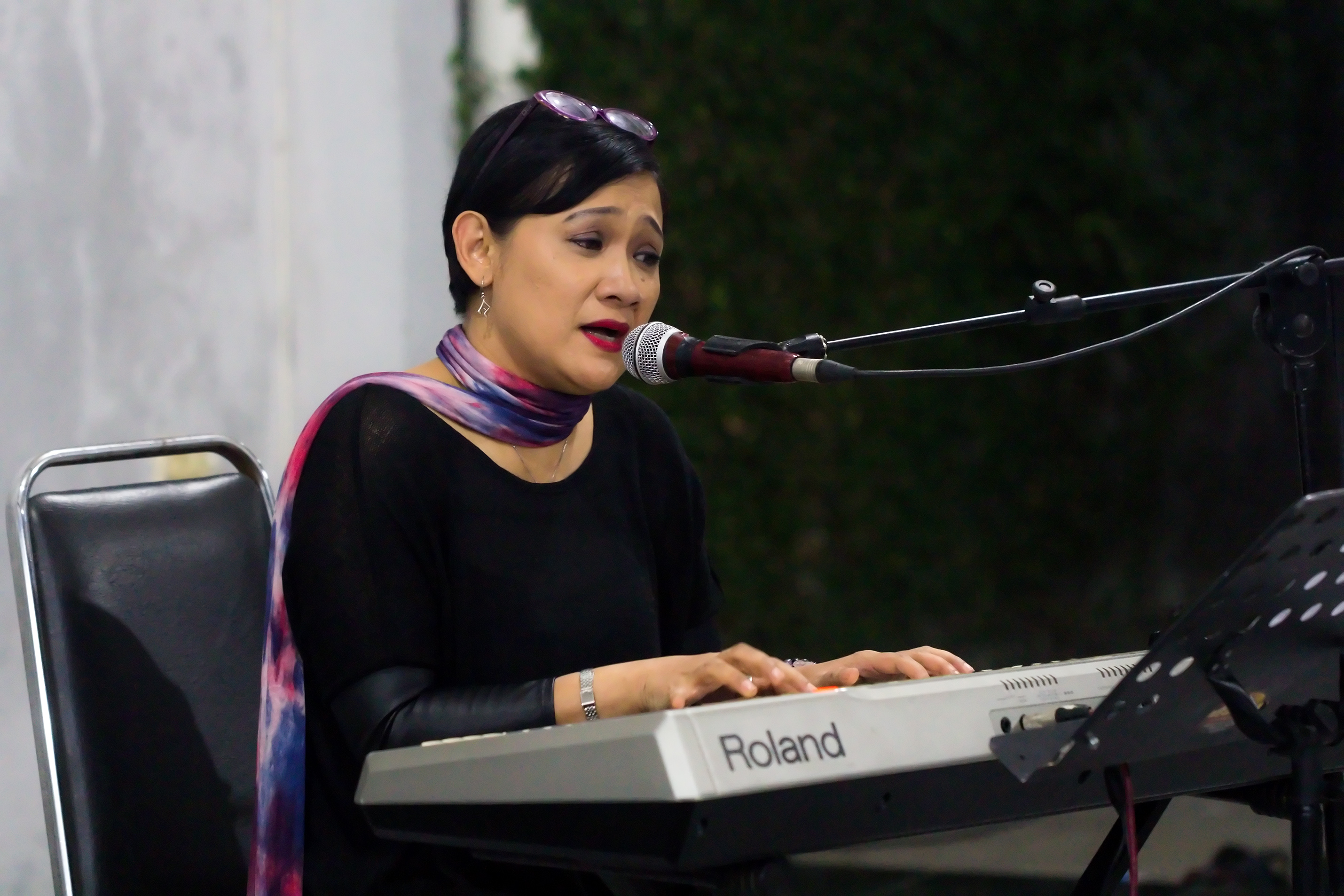
Dian HP playing an art song based on a poem by Sitok Srengenge

On 14 February 2011, Dian produced Delapan Komposisi Cinta (Eight Compositions of Love), a concert for Ubiet Raseuki. The concert, with lyrics taken directly from the work of Sitok Srengenge and Nirwan Dewanto, received a second performance in June. In between the concerts, she wrote a rock musical based on the 1977 film Ali Topan Anak Jalanan (Ali Topan the Street Child). The musical featured original compositions by herself (her first rock compositions) and previously produced work by Guruh Soekarnoputra and Chrisye.

That same year, Dian celebrated her birthday by holding two concerts, on 6 and 7 August, entitled Semesta Cinta (Universe of Love). The concerts, held at Salihara Theatre in South Jakarta, featured 12 art songs written by Dian and Sitok Srengenge that were sung by 22 singers from a variety of backgrounds. It was followed by the launch of an album of the same name.

== Accolades ==
Dian has received numerous awards for her film compositions. Her work for Hanny Saputra's 2007 film Love is Cinta garnered her an award for Best Music Arranger. Several other films, including Ramadhan Ramona (1992), Rini Tomboy (Rini the Tomboy; 1992), Mirror (2005), Denias: Senandung di Atas Awan (Denias: Humming Above the Clouds; 2006) and Liburan Seru (Fun Holiday; 2007) received nominations. Her work on child singer Tasya's 2003 album Istana Pizza garnered Best Song Writer and the Best Producer for a Children's Album.
