= Canberra High School =

Location
- 20 Bindubi Street, Macquarie; Canberra, Australian Capital Territory, 2614; Australia; 35.252°S 149.074°E

Information
- Type: Public high school
- Motto: Una mente, uno consilio (One mind, one plan)
- Established: 1938
- Principal: Janine Waters
- Teaching staff: 66
- Years offered: 7–10
- Gender: Co-educational
- Enrolment: 913 (2024)
- Colours: Black and white
- Website: www.canberrahs.act.edu.au

Canberra High School is a years 7–10 public co-educational high school in Macquarie, Canberra, Australian Capital Territory, Australia, established in 1938.

== History ==
Canberra High School was established in 1938, situated in central Canberra. The school moved in 1969. The former school buildings are now the home of the Australian National University School of Arts.

== Curriculum ==
Maths, science, English, HaSS (Humanities and Social Sciences, originally SOSE or Studies of Society and Environment) and SHAPE (Study of Health And Physical Education) are all compulsory for all students in compliance to the National Curriculum.

Students in year 9 and 10 are also able to enrol in a variety of elective subjects including the arts (dance, drama, music, photography and art), technology (food technology, workshop technology, graphics, and textiles) and information technology (robotronics and programming).

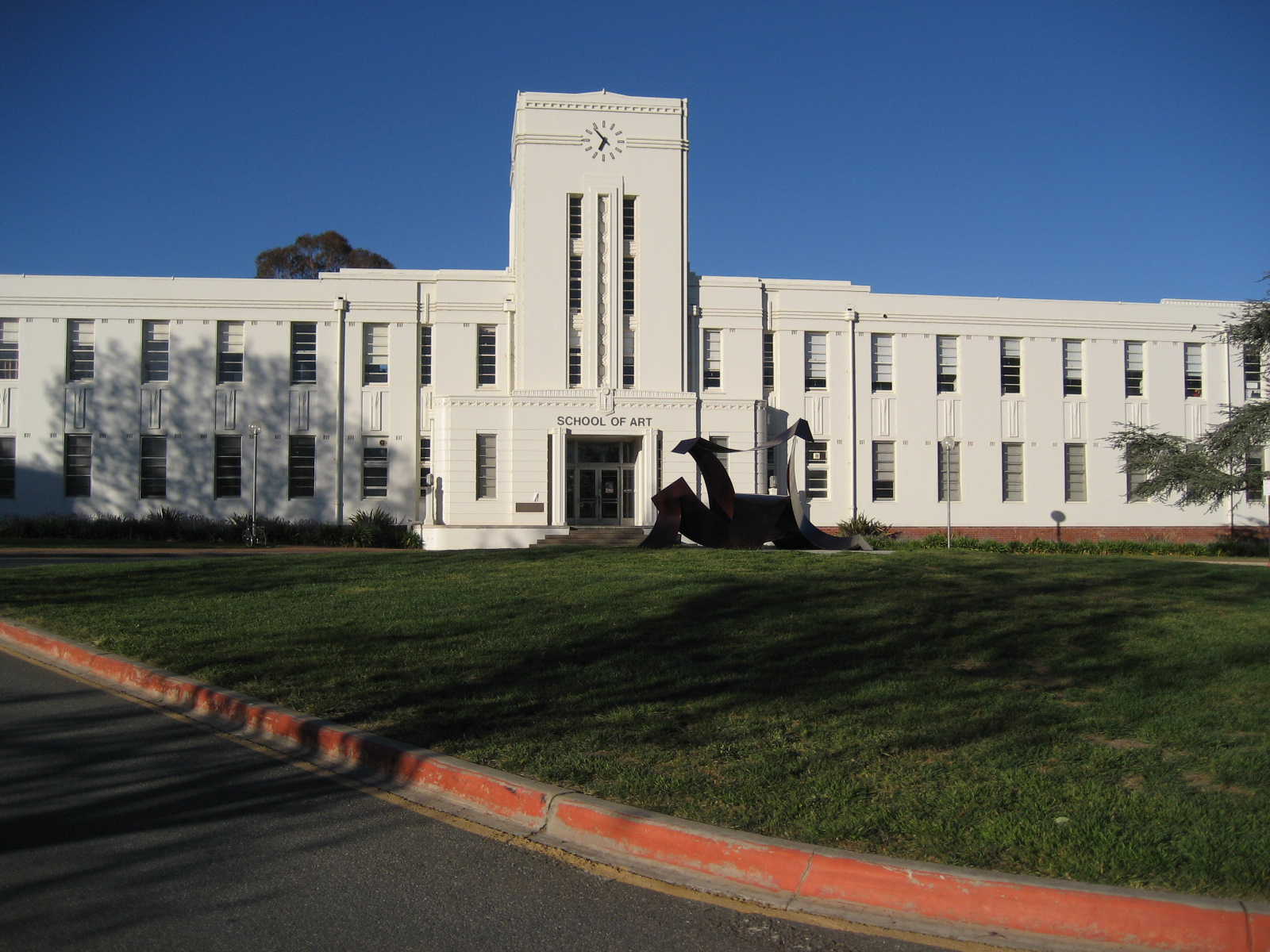
Former Canberra High school, now the School of Arts, ANU Canberra

They also offer challenge groups for gifted and talented students as part of their INSPIRE (gifted and talented program), a number of school bands, various sporting teams, and a debating team.

== Notable alumni ==
- Elizabeth Reid (matriculated c.1960), later women's adviser to Prime Minister Gough Whitlam and development worker
- Mia Wasikowska
