= On Guard (1984 film) =

- Directed by: Susan Lambert
- Written by: Sarah Gibson; Susan Lambert
- Produced by: Digby Duncan
- Starring: Liddy Clark; Jan Cornall; Kerry Dwyer; Mystery Carnage
- Cinematography: Laurie McInnes
- Edited by: Catherine Murphy
- Music by: Stray Dags
- Release date: March 2, 1984
- Running time: 51 min
- Country: Australia
- Language: English
- Budget: $142,000

On Guard is a 1984 Australian film directed by Susan Lambert. It was filmed with a largely female crew and a budget of $142,000. It features music from Stray Dags, an all female band that has co-star Mystery Carnage on vocals and percussion.

== Synopsis ==
Four women set out to destroy a reproductive engineering program.

== Cast ==
- Liddy Clark as Amelia
- Jan Cornall as Diana
- Kerry Dwyer as Adrienne
- Mystery Carnage as Georgia

== Reception ==
Anna-Maria Dell'Oso in the Sydney Morning Herald wrote "On Guard maintains a dark and relentless seat-gripping pace. With a chillingly beautiful music score written and played by The Stray Dags, On Guard is thought-provoking, urgent and witty." The Age's Buffs' choice column says that it "cuts across genre boundaries and raise important current issues." The Canberra Times' Dougal MacDonald ponders "One cannot but wonder about the sort of film that would have resulted if they had been given enough screen time to develop the plot to the extent it is capable of sustaining and to tie off those loose ends."
