= Stray Dags =

Australian feminist band (1979–1984)

The Stray Dags, nicknamed The Dags, were an Australian all-female post-punk Australian band. Formed in Sydney in 1979, the band were very successful in the independent music scene, and toured Australian capital cities as well as playing frequently in Sydney. They released one single, "Self Attack" / "Confessions" (1981), and one self-produced album, Lemons Alive!, through their production company Ewe Wave Music.

== History ==
The Stray Dags, a musical group which formed in Sydney in 1979, are variously described as "a lesbian rock band" and "feminist post-punk band with reggae and ska influences". The name is a play on the phrase "stray dogs", with the substituted word, dag being Australian slang deriving from "daglock", (Note: "the grotty bits of wool around a sheep's bottom which can spell disaster for a sheep.) often used affectionately as a term describing someone dressed untidily, shabbily, or unfashionably, but also used derogatorily, as a fool.

The founding members of the band were Tina Harris, Mystery Carnage, and Ludo McFerran, who got together and started at the Women's Warehouse. They could borrow equipment and there were regular cabarets.

The Dags' first live performance was at the Toucan Cafe in the inner-Sydney suburb of Glebe, when the cafe held a week of women's music. They only played three songs, two of which were written by Ludo McFerran. The songs included "Jenny the Jillaroo" and "Elsie Blues", the later about the about the Elsie Women's Refuge, which was the first women's refuge in Australia, established in 1974 by Anne Summers and Bessie Guthrie.

The band had a weekly gig at the Sussex Hotel on Thursday nights, and performed at monthly "rent dances" to support the Women's Warehouse at the Haymarket. They also toured to the capital cities of Brisbane, Adelaide, Canberra, and Melbourne. Many of their gigs were played at gay and lesbian dances that were "one of the main forms of LGBT organisation" at the time. In Adelaide, they played four gigs over June one year, including at Norwood Town Hall and Uni Bar, with supporting bands.

On Saturday 9 August 1980 they appeared at Glebe Town Hall in Sydney, along with Wimmins Circus and Hens' Teeth.

In January 1982 The Dags performed at "Frock Rock", a women's music event that was part of the Sydney Festival. The event was staged at both Sydney Town Hall and Petersham Town Hall, and included musicians from Sydney, Adelaide, and Melbourne.

On 18 September 1982, they performed at Melbourne State College, along with Right Furniture.

1984 saw their music used in the film On Guard, in which Carnage also co-starred.

The Stray Dags disbanded in 1984.

== Description ==
Members of the Stray Dags were:

- Tina Harris (vocals/guitar)
- Chris Burke (drums) (died 2016)
- Celeste Howden (bass)
- Mystery Carnage (vocals/percussion)
- Ludo McFerran (saxophone)

A fan described the band's sound as being an "original, quirky blend of blues reggae funk pop and disco... [with a] great sense of self-parody and wry humour"; however, some of their songs, such as "Tension" and "Heterosexual Jungle" are intentionally angry.

== Songs and releases ==
The Stray Dags' most well-known track (although not to mainstream audiences) was "Self Attack". The song, described by a fan as "an upbeat disco tune with a driving bass line", was released as a vinyl 45rpm single in 1981, with "Confessions" on the B Side. The lyrics of "Self Attack" have been interpreted as "a feminist commentary on how women 'attack' their body surgically via plastic surgery, and also, for those in the know, a somewhat indirect and sly dig toward radical feminists into self-defence".

Their only album, Lemons Alive!, was released in 1983 and reached the top spot on the independent music chart. Tracks on Lemons Alive! are:

A-side:

- Cradle Song
- Tension
- Love Songs
- Let's Have A Party
- Avon Calling

B-side:

- Intimidation
- Black + Blue
- Het Jungle
- Six Months
- Rude Girls

Their album was self-produced, by their outfit Ewe Wave Music, after finding women with production and sound engineering skills (Lesley Wood, Sharon Jakovsky, and Kathy Sport) to assist.

Both the single and the album were played by 2JJ (now Triple J) and community radio stations.

The song "Self Attack" features on the soundtrack released in conjunction with the 2020 Australian documentary feature film directed by Catherine Dwyer about the history of the Women's Liberation Movement of that era, along with songs by Toxic Shock, Judy Small, Hens' Teeth, Clitoris Band, Robyn Archer, and others.

== Recognition ==
The National Film and Sound Archive of Australia describes the Stray Dags as "one of the most successful band of the women's music scene in the early 1980s".

A 1980 poster by Leonie Lane of the Lucifoil Poster Collective, created in the Tin Sheds (Sydney University Art Workshop) in 1980, is held by the National Gallery of Australia. In the foreground is a flock of sheep, to one side a building with "Wimmins Warehouse" on it, and across the middle in large letters, "Stray Dags".

Several posters relating to the Dags are held at the Jessie Street National Women's Library in Sydney. One of these, designed by Anne Sheridan and Marla Guppy, reads "Stray Dags : my auntie went to Sydney Australia & all I got was a Stray Dags record. Ewe Wave music!"

== Reunion ==
As a fundraiser for film project Rock On With Your Frock On on Saturday 28 November 2009, a one-off reunion of the band, performing as the headline act after a number of other bands, was held at Red Rattler Theatre in Marrickville, Sydney. The film, by Kathy Sport, was planned to be a documentary about Australian women musicians. (Note: It seems that the film never got made (website now defunct), but writer/ director Kathy Sport wrote a PhD thesis called "Women's music in Australia: space, place, bodies, performance" at Macquarie University in 2015.) Members of the audience had travelled from Canberra, Adelaide, and Melbourne. The MC for the event, titled "Dagarama", was Fran Kelly, and their performance was described by an attendee as "an energetic and electric hour-long set". Erica Lewis played drums for the night. The performance was filmed.
