= Mary Rose Columba Adams =

(1832–1891) Dominican prioress

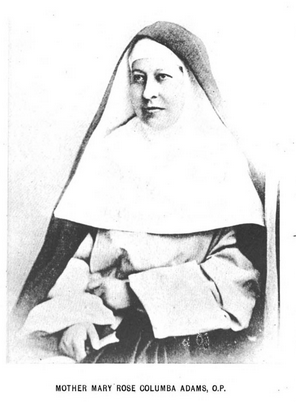
- Title: Mother

Personal life
- Born: Sophia Charlotte Louisa Adams; 21 March 1832 Woodchester, Gloucestershire, England
- Died: 30 December 1891 (aged 59) North Adelaide
- Resting place: West Terrace cemetery, Adelaide

Religious life
- Religion: Roman Catholic
- Order: Dominican
- Founder of: St Dominic's Priory College, Adelaide and the Church of Perpetual Adoration
- Monastic name: Rose Columba
- Consecration: 26 May 1857

Senior posting
- Period in office: 1856–1891

Mary Rose Columba Adams (21 March 1832 — 30 December 1891), born Sophia Charlotte Louisa Adams, was an English Roman Catholic Dominican prioress, recognized as a founder of St Dominic's Priory and the Church of Perpetual Adoration in North Adelaide, Australia.

== Early life ==
Adams was born to Anglican parents, James Smith Adams and the former Emma Elizabeth McTaggart, in Woodchester, Gloucestershire. Her parents met and married in India. Her mother died in 1843, and her father in 1860.

At age 19, Sophia Adams converted to Roman Catholicism against family disapproval. She entered the Dominican convent at Stone in Staffordshire in 1856, as a postulant, and took her religious name "Rose Columba" upon profession in May 1857.

== Career ==
As a young religious sister she taught at schools in Stone. In 1860, Sister Rose Columba became vicaress in the community at the Church of Our Lady of the Angels in Stoke-upon-Trent. She was appointed vicaress (later prioress) at St Mary's Church in Torquay in 1866, and served there until 1883. In the summer of 1883, Mother Rose Columba left that work to lead a group of eight overseas to Australia, where Dominican sisters were called to nurse. She kept a journal of the six-week voyage. In Adelaide, the sisters opened a school, embroidered, painted, and cared for the sick, while Mother Rose Columba worked to establish a spiritual component to the community. She designed a Gothic Revival chapel for the convent, but did not live to see it completed.

== Death and legacy ==
Mother Rose Columba Adams died in 1891, aged 59, from kidney failure, at the convent she founded in North Adelaide. The girls' school she and her group founded in North Adelaide remains in operation as St Dominic's Priory College.
