= Jan Cornall =

Australian singer-songwriter and comedian

- Born: August 17, 1950 (age 76); Melbourne, Australia
- Education: Melbourne Teachers' College
- Occupations: Singer, writer, comedian
- Years active: 1968–present
- Known for: Queer music with Baba Yaga, musical Failing in Love Again, women's comedy and cabaret, theatre writing
- Notable work: Failing in Love Again (1979), Escape From a Better Place, Take Me To Paradise, Singing Srengenge
- Awards: New Writers Fellowship, Australia Council for the Arts
- Website: www.writersjourney.com.au/writersjourney/

Jan Cornall is an Australian singer, comedian and writer. Known for her contributions to queer music through the group Baba Yaga during the 1970s and the hit musical Failing in Love Again (1979), Jan Cornall was a leader in the women's comedy and cabaret resurgence of the early 1980s. She has contributed to Australian community theatre, addressing issues facing regional and rural women, and had a long involvement in forging cross cultural links with Indonesian and Australian writers and artists.

== Background ==
Born in Melbourne, Australia, Jan Cornall started performing at young age in school plays and musicals. She studied speech and drama at Melbourne Teachers' College under the tutelage of Max Gillies. She began her performance career as a founding member of the Tribe experimental theatre group in 1968. During this time, they performed 'Happenings', 'Guerilla Theatre' and 'Street Theatre', leading the Vietnam War moratorium marches in Melbourne with a series of street performances. The Tribe group were regulars at the famous La Mama Theatre (Melbourne) where they met and later merged with the Australian Performing Group (APG) at the Pram Factory Theatre.

== Career ==
In 1973, Cornall performed alongside Red Symonds, lead guitarist of Skyhooks, in the play The Ride Across Lake Constance by German absurdist Peter Handke. Following this time, Cornall travelled overseas, performing solo as a singer/songwriter, before joining the all-girl Latin jazz band, Baba Yaga, in Portland Oregon. She recorded the album On The Edge with the band as vocalist and percussionist.

On her return to Australia, Cornall joined the radical arm of The Pram Factory "Nightshift", performing in Marguerite Duras' play L'Amant Anglais and the world premiere of Stephen Sewell's play Traitors. In 1979, Cornall was invited to be writer in residence at the Pram Factory, where she wrote and performed in her musical Failing in Love Again. With musical partner Elizabeth Drake, they performed alongside Jeannie Lewis, Margaret Roadnight and Robyn Archer on the Australian festival circuit and with Cabaret Conspiracy in Sydney. In 1984 she co-starred in the film On Guard.

== Solo work ==
In 1983, Cornall went solo, performing her one-woman comedy on stage with Gretel Killeen and Wendy Harmer at the Gap Women's Comedy Shows in Sydney and regional New South Wales.

== Writing for theatre and film ==
At the end of 1984, after touring nationally with a number of shows, Cornall gave up performing to concentrate on writing for theatre and film. She received a New Writers Fellowship from the Literature Fund of the Australia Council for the Arts. Her resultant play Escape From a Better Place was performed by four theatre companies, later adapted for ABC Radio Drama and read at the International Women's Playwrights Conference in Athens in 2000.

During the 1990s, Cornall wrote the screenplay Talk, an Australian feature film directed by Susan Lambert. Talk showed in New York as part of a US tour and was reviewed in the Village Voice. Cornall went on to write two musical plays for the Women on a Shoestring theatre company about Australian farming women and the unknown stars of the Australian silent film industry.

== Unique project work ==
In 2000, Cornall worked as writer on a unique project with Australian Tibetan musician Tenzing Tsewang, dramatising the story of his journey out of Tibet. Directed by Brian Joyce, Hanging Onto the Tail of a Goat was the first solo theatre production by a Tibetan performer in Australia. It showed in Melbourne, Wollongong, Penrith and Sydney's Opera House Studio. At the same time, she began teaching writing workshops and retreats in communities, writers centres and colleges. In 2004, Cornall ran her first writers retreat in Ubud, Bali in conjunction with the inaugural Ubud Writers and Readers Festival.

== Work in Indonesia ==
Her time spent in Indonesia began collaborative relationships which she continued to develop over the following years with an Asia Link residency in Jakarta in 2006. During this time Cornall wrote Take Me To Paradise, a novel, and composed and recorded Singing Srengenge in collaboration with noted Indonesian poet Sitok Srengenge and jazz pianist Imel Rosalin. At festivals in Indonesia, Cornall returned to performance after an absence of 20 years, performing her spoken and sung word at literary festivals and performance art at Perfurbance No. 2, #3, No. 4, street and village festivals in Jogjakarta. As an arts and travel journalist, Cornall's articles and have been published in Jakarta Post, RealTime Arts, Arts Hub, Urthona magazine and The Daily Telegraph.

== Gang Festival ==
In January 2008, Jan took part in Gang Festival in Sydney, an artist-run exchange between Australian and Indonesian artists and wrote, produced and performed in a stage version of Take Me To Paradise, with Indonesian performers: artist Jumaadi, poet Sitok Srengenge, musicians Deva Permana and Wendy Anggerani for OzASia Festival in Adelaide.

Cornall continues to work on writing projects while leading annual writing journeys to international locations including Bali, Fiji, Laos, Morocco.
