= Krassin Himmirsky =

Bulgarian career diplomat

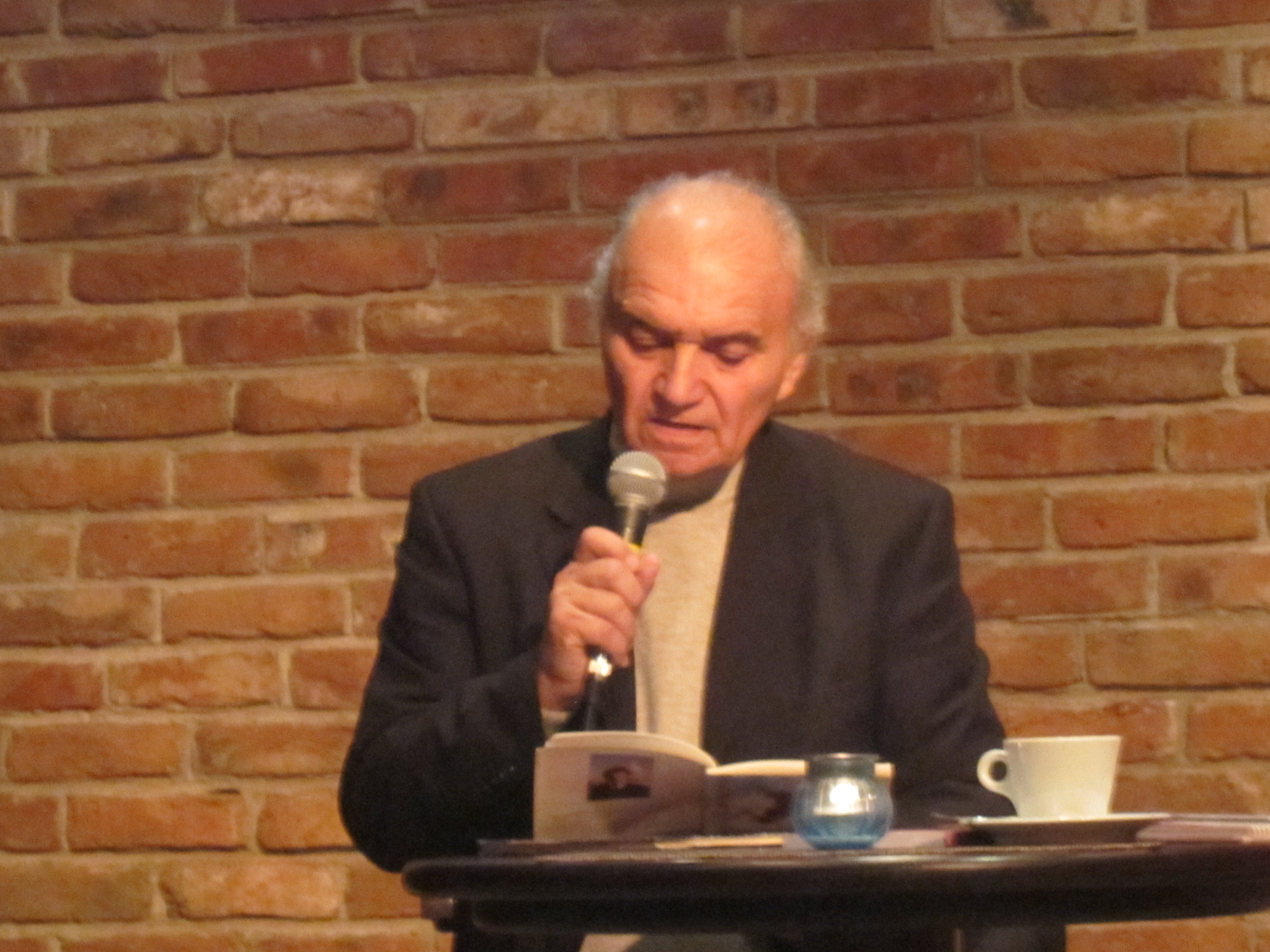

Personal details
- Born: 8 October 1938 Varbitsa, Vratsa Province, Bulgaria
- Died: 19 April 2022 (aged 83) Tbilisi, Georgia
- Children: 1
- Education: Moscow State Institute of International Relations
- Occupation: diplomat, writer, translator, lecturer

Krassin Valchev Himmirsky (Bulgarian: Красин Вълчев Химирски, born on 8 October 1938 in Varbitsa, Vratsa Province, Bulgaria, died on 19 April 2022 in Tbilisi, Georgia) was a Bulgarian career diplomat, writer (poet, essayist, short stories author), translator, lecturer.

== Diplomatic career ==
Graduated from the Moscow State Institute of International Relations in International Relations with Indonesian language (1962). Received a PhD degree in American Literature after defending a thesis on “The Development of the Democratic Traditions in Contemporary American Poetry” in the Academy of Social Sciences in Moscow (1974).

As a career diplomat Himmirsky has been assigned at the Bulgarian embassies in:

- Jakarta, Indonesia – as chargé d'affaires a.i., cultural and press attache (1964 – 1968),
- Washington DC, United States – as chargé d'affaires a.i. and cultural attache (1976 – 1981),
- Moscow, USSR – as minister plenipotentiary (1987 – 1990).

Recently he has been employed as a Democratization officer and an Election officer of the Organization for Security and Cooperation in Europe (OSCE) Mission to Bosnia and Herzegovina (1999 – 2002). Later he was head of the Science department of the Russian Cultural and Information Centre in Sofia.

== Poetry ==
Krassin Himmirsky has taught Literature, American Studies, Asian Civilizations, Religions and Culture at: Sofia University "St. Kliment. Ohridski", the University of National and World Economy, the New Bulgarian University, Shumen University "Konstantin Preslavski" and the American University in Bulgaria. He is the only Bulgarian lecturer of Indonesian language.

Among his publications are books of poetry and fiction:

- “Time Bomb” (1999),
- “Martians” (1996),
- “Looking for Atlantis” (1987),
- “Star Bread”, (1987),
- “Open Up, Sir” (1986),
- “I Believe” (1980),
- “Cambodia”, etc.

His works are translated into the major European and Asian languages. He has read his works at poetry readings in Sofia, Moscow, Kyiv, Chișinău, Washington DC, New London, Jakarta, Bandung, Struga, etc. His poetic works have been recorded and are included into the Collection of the Library of the Congress in Washington DC.

Himmirsky has translated into Bulgarian creative writings by American, Canadian, Russian, Armenian, Lithuanian, Latvian, Moldovian, Chuvash and Indonesian authors. Among the authors he has translated are: Carl Sandburg, Erskine Caldwell, John Chever, John Updike, Robert Frost, Robert Lowell, William Meredith, Robert Hayden, Denise Levertov, Wendell Berry, Allen Ginsberg, Roland Flint, Victoria Holt, Pramoedia Ananta Toer, Michail Sespel, Yurii Sahakyan, Oleg Hlebnikov, Valerii Shamshurin, Raisa Sarbi, Porfirii Afanasiev, Utui Tatang Sontani, Anthology of Indonesian poetry, etc.

Member of the unions of Bulgarian writers, translators, journalists, member of the International Slavic Fund (Moscow), president and member of the Board of the Bulgarian-Indonesian Friendship Association “Nusantara”. He is president of the MGIMO Alumni Association in Bulgaria.

Himmirsky died at the age of 83 in Tbilisi, Georgia on 19 April 2022.
