= Toxic Shock (band) =

Early 1980s Australian band

Toxic Shock, formerly Girls' Garage Band, were a former Australian feminist musical group, active in Melbourne from 1979 to around 1982. Co-founded by Sylvie Leber and Eve Glenn, the band had seven members. These included Fran Kelly, who later became a journalist and radio presenter. Glenn, who played rhythm guitar, is also renowned for her poster art.

== Background ==
The Girls' Garage Band founding members included seven women, all of whom had different musical backgrounds and tastes. The founders were "part of a scene... [of] women's bands like Clitoris, Flying Tackle, Foreign Body, Riff Raff, and Shameless Hussies".

Sylvie Leber was born in France and migrated to Australia with her parents when she was two. She joined a group of male musicians from Adelaide who had moved to Melbourne, forming a soul and R&B band called The Cakes when she was 27. She later played in a heavy metal band called Nasty Habit, and a post-punk band called Failure (aka Fail 2). She had also worked in women's refuges and co-founded the first sexual assault centre in Australia, and was "an active feminist".

Leber and guitarist Eve Glenn initiated the band, using their friendships and networks, which included the Melbourne Women's Theatre Group, Wimmins Circus, and Circus Oz, to recruit other members.

== Girls' Garage Band ==
The Girls' Garage Band played at the same gig as The Go-Betweens (whose drummer was Lindy Morrison); at one gig were supported by the Merinos, with Deborah Conway (before she formed Do Re Mi); and also played with Redgum and AfriJah. The band played a full set list, including original songs as well as covers of songs such as The Easybeats' "I'll Make You Happy", and other "feelgood party numbers" (according to Leber, who admired The Slits and The Raincoats). Vicki Bell, the singer, also wrote songs, including "Concrete Evidence" and "Prisoner", which was on the B side of Toxic Shock's 7" single.

A photograph of the Girls' Garage Band performing in a backyard in the Melbourne suburb of Northcote taken by Sue Ford featured in a retrospective exhibition of her work at the NGV in 2014. The photo, dated 1981, features Sylvie Leber, Fran Kelly, Nina Bondarenko, Vicki Bell, Hellen Sky, and Eve Glenn.

== Toxic Shock ==
Girls' Garage band disbanded, and re-formed as Toxic Shock. Part of the reason for this was a change of drummer – Bondarenko left to play in the Little Band scene, and was replaced by Helen Smart. Around 1980, the band also played a one-off gig at a "Women and Patriarchy" conference under the name "One Night Stand".

The name is derived from a life-threatening illness making headlines at the time, called toxic shock syndrome, which was found to be associated with high-absorbency tampons.

Vicki Bell, the singer, also wrote songs, including "Concrete Evidence" and "Prisoner", which was the B side of their first 7" single.

=== "Housewives" single ===
Toxic Shock members are listed on their single "Housewives" as:

- Vicki Bell (guitar and vocals)
- Cashsn Foley (keyboards)
- Eve Glenn (rhythm guitar)
- Fran Kelly (lead singer)
- Sylvie Leber (bass guitar)
- Hellen Sky (mandolin and vocals)
- Helen Smart (drums)

The single, which was on the EMI Custom label in 1981, listed Eve Glenn as creator of lyrics and music for "Housewives", which was sung by Sky and Kelly. The B side featured two songs: "Intoxicated", which listed Leber as responsible for the music and lyrics, sung by Kelly, Tess McPeake, and Nina Bondarenko; and "Prisoner", for which Bell created the lyrics and music, sung by Bell and Kelly.

Eve Glenn designed a poster, which featured a line drawing of Hellen Sky, for an event celebrating the launch of the single on 9 July 1981 at Northcote Town Hall.

"Intoxicated" later featured on the 2016 compilation album: Subnormal Girls - DIY/Post Punk 1979-83 Vol. 1. It also featured on a compilation album released along with the feature film documentary Brazen Hussies, titled Brazen Hussies - Songs from the Film - and More, on 6 November 2020.

=== Dissolution ===
Leber said that the band were together for around two to three years, eventually breaking up because Bell was moving to Canberra, and they felt that she was a key member of the band, who could not be replaced.

== After the band ==
Leber was, at the same time as playing in the band, the founding host of a show on 3RRR called Give-Men-A-Pause (a play on the word "menopause"), featuring women musicians. She later played with other bands, including a North African Raï band called La Kasbah, and a community orchestra, The Footscray Gypsies.

Helen Smart continued playing drums; Fran Kelly became a respected radio journalist and presenter; while Hellen Sky became a well-known figure in contemporary dance.

Before joining the band, Eve Glenn had studied art and created a posters for Circus Oz and the Wimmins Circus, for whom she played electric guitar. After Toxic Shock, she went on to play in Barbies Dead. She then worked as a freelancing scenic artist, painting set, props, and floors for TV, theatre, circus, and films, and also painted for industries such as construction, entertainment, and visual merchandising. She designed, made, and painted parade banners and floats, and even painted trams. Her work has been exhibited, and is held in collections. A large number of her own collection of posters (designed by her and others) were auctioned in October 2024.
