= Fran Kelly =

Australian radio presenter

Fran Kelly AO
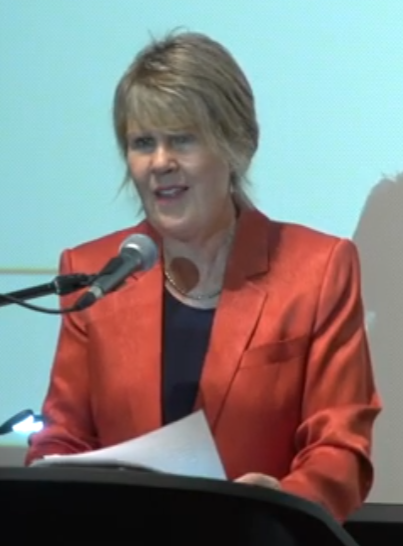
- At a National Reconciliation Week panel discussion in 2021
- Born: Adelaide, South Australia
- Education: St Dominic's Priory College
- Occupation: Australian radio presenter
- Years active: 1988–present
- Known for: Current affairs journalism and political correspondence

Frances Margaret Kelly AO is an Australian radio presenter, current affairs journalist, and political correspondent who hosted the Australian Broadcasting Corporation's Radio National program Breakfast from March 2005 to early December 2021.

== Early life and education ==
Fran Kelly grew up in Adelaide, South Australia, one of six siblings. Her mother's name was Margaret Tribe, and her father was Francis (Frank) Kelly, who was a chiropractor and World War Two veteran.

She matriculated from St Dominic's Priory College in North Adelaide in 1974 and, after missing out on a cadetship at The Advertiser, a couple of years later went to the University of Adelaide, completing an arts degree and majoring in literature and classics while also being involved in the women's movement, theatre and music.

She then worked as an activities officer, booking bands and organising events, first at Flinders University and then La Trobe University in Melbourne from 1980. In Melbourne, she was lead vocalist and played rhythm guitar for an all-female band called Toxic Shock, which released a single, "Intoxicated" in 1981.

== Career in journalism ==
After realising that what she really wanted to do was journalism, in 1988 Kelly moved to Sydney to work on The Drum on Triple J. In 1990 she became a reporter for ABC Radio National's current affairs programs AM and PM. Kelly became Canberra bureau chief, chief political correspondent with AM and PM, political editor for ABC's Radio National Breakfast and ABC television's The 7:30 Report and the ABC's Europe correspondent. In 2005 she returned to Australia to host Radio National Breakfast.

Kelly was involved with the documentary series The Howard Years in 2008, for which she interviewed former US president George W. Bush. She has appeared as a panellist and commentator on ABC TV's Insiders, and hosted the show from August to December 2019.

On 21 October 2021, Kelly announced that she was leaving RN Breakfast, although she would continue to work for the ABC in roles such as covering federal elections, continuing as co-host of The Party Room podcast, and other future projects. Her last show was on 2 December 2021.

In August 2022, Kelly was announced as the host of a new chat show on ABC TV called Frankly. Her appointment attracted criticism from some newspaper columnists who all opined that the job should have been given to someone much younger. This prompted a public debate about the apparent ageist attitudes and discrimination towards older women in the media. ABC chair Ita Buttrose and Kelly's successor at RN Breakfast Patricia Karvelas were also criticised after they both defended Kelly against what they perceived to be ageist attitudes.

Frankly debuted on ABC TV on 7 October 2022 with Shaun Micallef, Richard Harris and Kirsten Banks appearing as Kelly's first guests. The program received generally mixed to positive reviews.

In early 2024, Kelly started presenting a podcast called Yours Queerly. In February 2024, Noongar journalist and TV presenter Narelda Jacobs appeared with Pasifika New Zealander drag artist Kween Kong on the show.

In 2024 it was reported that Kelly would host a new program on ABC's Radio National entitled The Radio National Hour. She hosted the program through to 19 August, but Michael Rowland took over as host on the 20th, posting on his Facebook page that he was "back behind the Radio National Hour mic for a little while Fran Kelly takes an extended break". On 7 November 2025 Rowland announced on Facebook that he was "finishing up my stint filling in for Fran Kelly on the Radio National Hour".

== Recognition ==
In 2008, Kelly received a Same Same 25 award, recognising her as one of the country's most influential gay and lesbian Australians. She was named by the(sydney)magazine (Note: Published by The Sydney Morning Herald) as one of Sydney's 100 most influential people of 2011, and was described by the Australian electronic magazine Crikey as "one of the most influential media players in the country" in the same year.

Kelly was appointed an Officer of the Order of Australia in the 2026 King's Birthday Honours in recognition of "distinguished service to broadcast journalism, to the advancement of social justice, to equality, and to advocacy for the LGBTQIA+ community".

== Other activities ==
On Saturday, 28 November 2009, Kelly was MC for a fundraising event for Kathy Sport's film project, Rock On With Your Frock On, about Australian women's music. Taking place at the Red Rattler Theatre in Marrickville, Sydney, The Stray Dags were the headline act at the event.

== Political views and activism ==
Kelly has described herself as an activist. Kelly is a feminist, and stated in a 2012 interview that she's identified as such since her school years.

In 2007, Kelly launched the Australian Human Rights Commission's "Same-Sex: Same Entitlements" inquiry. She has been involved with One Just World's speaker forums, moderating a "Women of the World" forum for WOMADelaide and speaking on the "Stand Up Against Poverty" forum in 2009.

== Personal life ==
In August 2021, it was reported that Kelly had been with her partner, Marion Frith, for almost 30 years. Kelly is step-parent to Frith's three children from a previous relationship.
