= Nirwan Dewanto =

Indonesian poet, curator and cultural critic

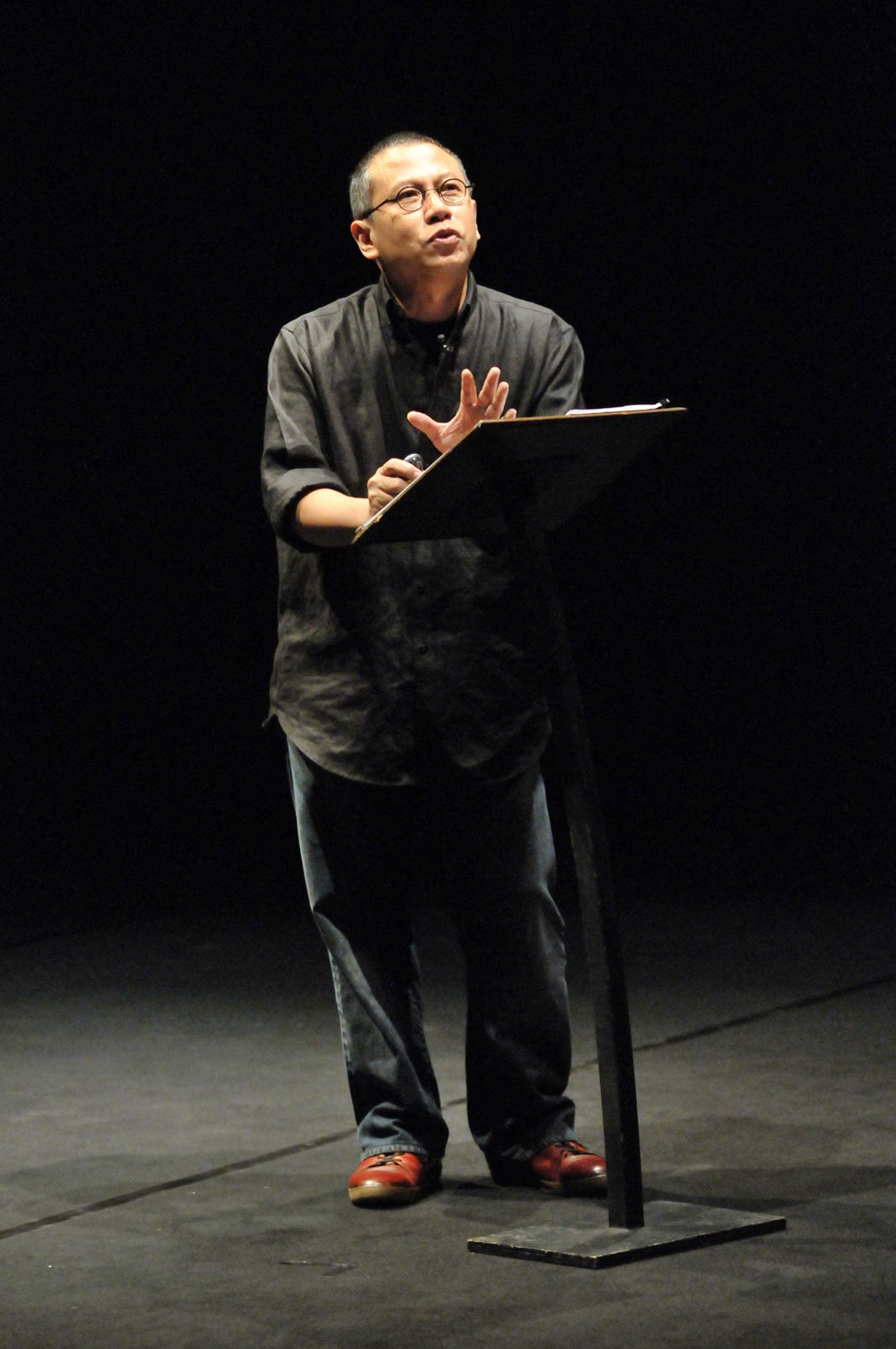
- Dewanto, 2011
- Born: 28 September 1961 (age 64); Surabaya, East Java, Indonesia
- Education: Bandung Institute of Technology
- Occupation: Poet
- Known for: Writing

Nirwan Dewanto (born 28 September 1961) is an Indonesian poet, curator and cultural critic. He is also known for his depiction of Albertus Soegijapranata in the 2012 biopic Soegija.

== Biography ==
Dewanto was born in Surabaya, East Java, on 28 September 1961. While still in senior high school he was already writing poetry; the poems were published in local magazines such as Kuncung and Kartini. Dewanto did his university studies at the Bandung Institute of Technology in Bandung, West Java, from 1980 to 1987, where he received a degree in geology. He then moved to Jakarta.

In 1991 Dewanto was a speaker at the National Cultural Conference. He later became well known for his cultural commentary. Dewanto became editor of the magazine Kalam at its launch in February 1994, along with poet Goenawan Mohamad. In 1996 Dewanto released a collection of essays entitled Senjakala Kebudayaan.

Dewanto served on the first round jury of the inaugural Khatulistiwa Award in 2001. He was later critical of the process, stating that the jury generally did not properly understand the works they were selecting and at times seemed to act randomly. and had released a poetry anthology, Buku Cacing (Book of Worms).

Dewanto won the Khatulistiwa Award in 2008 for his poetry anthology Jantung Ratu Lebah (The Queen Bee's Heart); the award included Rp 100 million (US$8,800) in cash. Short story writer Seno Gumira Ajidarma, a judge on the panel, described the anthology as showing great achievement. In 2010 Dewanto released a poetry anthology entitled Buli-Buli Lima Kaki (Jars with Five Feet). The following year several of his works were put to music by Dian HP and Dewanto's wife, singer Nyak Ina Raseuki; Dewanto also performed poetry readings at the events.

In 2012 Dewanto played the Archbishop of Semarang Albertus Soegijapranata in the biopic Soegija, directed by Garin Nugroho. Nugroho said that he cast Dewanto owing to the latter's physical resemblance to Soegijapranata, despite Dewanto not being Catholic, meanwhile, Dewanto said that Nugroho had been very insistent that he take the role. Indah Setiawati, writing for The Jakarta Post, found him to have performed well, although she considered him to appear uncomfortable in some scenes.

== Bibliography ==
- "Aktor Romo Soegija Seorang Muslim" [The One Who Plays Father Soegija is a Muslim]. Tribun (in Indonesian). 21 May 2012. Archived from the original on 16 June 2012.
- Eneste, Pamusuk (2001). Buku Pintar Sastra Indonesia [Handbook of Indonesian Literature] (in Indonesian) (3rd ed.). Jakarta: Kompas. ISBN 978-979-9251-78-7.
- Hamdani, Sylvia (2 June 2011). "Making Poetry Sing, In the Name Of Love". Jakarta Globe.
- Haryanto, Ign.; Kuswardono, Arief; Dhyatmika, Wahyu (3 December 2001). "Sebuah Panggung Bernama Khatulistiwa" [A Stage Named Khatulistiwa]. Tempo (in Indonesian). Archived from the original on 10 February 2012.
- Hermawan, Ary; Messakh, Matheos (15 November 2008). "Ayu Utami, Nirwan Dewanto win Khatulistiwa literary prize". The Jakarta Post. Jakarta. Archived from the original on 9 July 2009.
- "Jurnal Angker dapat Populer?" [Can a Heavy Journal be Popular?]. Tempo (in Indonesian). 19 February 1994. Archived from the original on 13 July 2011.
- Setiawati, Indah (3 June 2012). "'Soegija' sends a message of humanity". The Jakarta Post. Jakarta. Archived from the original on 4 March 2016.
- Siregar, Lisa (29 May 2012). "'Soegija' More Than a War Film". Jakarta Globe. Archived from the original on 13 October 2012.
- Wisanggeni, Aryo; Sartono, Frans; Arcana, Putu Fajar (3 June 2012). "Nirwan Dewanto dalam Tikungan Kehidupan" [Nirwan Dewanto at a Turn in Life]. Kompas (in Indonesian).
