= Australian History Awards =

Awards

== Ernest Scott Prize ==
The pre-eminent prize for "original published research that contributes to the history of Australia or New Zealand or to the history of colonisation in these countries." Awarded since 1943, the prize is named in honor of Ernest Scott, regarded as the first historian of Australian historiography, and was endowed by his wife, Emily Scott. The winner is announced each year at the Kathleen Fitzpatrick Lecture, awarded a prize of $13,000 and invited to give the Ernest Scott Lecture at the University of Melbourne. Applicants must be publishers and the work must have been published in the preceding two calendar years. Winners must "live in Australia or New Zealand or the respective external territories [of either country]." There are two judges.

The prize is typically awarded to one historical writer, although it has been shared between two people and two books nine times. Seven people have won the Ernest Scott Prize twice, including one person who won the prize for two books in the same year (1959). One historian, Alan Atkinson, won the prize three times. The prize has been won by 35 men and 13 women historians, and three non-white historians.

Numerous winners of the prize are part of the Scott lineage, a teacher-undergraduate student chain of historians stretching back to Scott himself. Among the future prize winners Scott taught were Manning Clark, W. K. Hancock and Geoffrey Serle; Clark taught Weston Bate, Ken Inglis, Geoffrey Blainey and Graeme Davison; Blainey taught Janet McCalman and Stuart Macintyre.

Winner	Publisher	Book	Year awarded
Charlotte Macdonald	Bridget Williams Books	Garrison World: Redcoat Soldiers in New Zealand and across the British Empire	2026
Jane Carey	Monash University Publishing	Taking to the Field: A History of Australian Women in Science	2025
Shannyn Palmer	Melbourne University Press	Unmaking Angas Downs: Myth and history on a Central Australian pastoral station	2024
Alan Atkinson	NewSouth	Elizabeth and John: The Macarthurs of Elizabeth Farm	2023 (shared)
Rachel Buchanan	Bridget Williams Books	Te Motunui Epa	2023 (shared)
Lucy Mackintosh	Bridget Williams Books	Shifting Grounds: Deep Histories of Tāmaki Makaurau Auckland	2022 (shared)
Janet McCalman	The Miegunyah Press	Vandemonians: The Repressed History of Colonial Victorians	2022 (shared)
Hirini Kaa	Bridget Williams Books	Te Hāhi Mihinare – The Māori Anglican Church	2021 (shared)
Grace Karskens	Allen & Unwin	People of the River	2021 (shared)
Michelle Arrow	NewSouth	The Seventies: The Personal, The Political and the Making of Modern Australia	2020
Billy Griffiths	Black Inc.	Deep Time Dreaming: Uncovering Ancient Australia	2019
Michael Belgrave	Auckland University Press	Dancing with the King: The Rise and Fall of the King Country, 1864-1885	2018
Tom Griffiths	Black Inc.	The Art of Time Travel: Historians and Their Craft	2017
Stuart Macintyre	NewSouth	Australia's Boldest Experiment: War and Reconstruction in the 1940s	2016
Alan Atkinson	UNSW Press	The Europeans in Australia: Volume 3: Nation	2015 (shared)
Tom Brooking	Penguin Books, Auckland	Richard Seddon, King of God's Own: The Life and Times of New Zealand's Longest- Serving Prime Minister	2015 (shared)
Angela Wanhalla	Auckland University Press	Matters of the Heart. A History of Interracial marriage in New Zealand	2014
Melissa Bellanta	University of Queensland Press	Larrikins: A History	2013
Damon Salesa	Oxford University Press	Racial Crossings: Race, Intermarriage, and Victorian British Empire	2012
Jim Davidson	UNSW Press	A Three-cornered Life: The Historian W.K. Hancock	2011 (shared)
Emma Christopher	Allen & Unwin	A Merciless Place: the lost story of Britain's convict disaster in Africa and how it led to the settlement of Australia	2011 (shared)
Bain Attwood	The Miegunyah Press	Possession: Batman's Treaty and the Matter of History	2010
Henry Reynolds & Marilyn Lake	Melbourne University Press	Drawing the Global Colour Line: White Men's Countries and the Question of Racial Equality	2009 (joint)
John Fitzgerald	UNSW Press	Book Big White Lie: Chinese Australians in White Australia	2008
Regina Ganter	University of Western Australia	Mixed Relations: Asian-Aboriginal Contact in North Australia	2007
Joy Damousi	UNSW Press	Freud in the Antipodes: A Cultural History of Psychoanalysis in Australia	2006
Alan Atkinson	Oxford University Press	The Europeans in Australia: A History: Democracy	2005
Judith Brett	Cambridge University Press	Australian Liberals and the Moral Middle Class: from Alfred Deakin to John Howard	2004
Philip Temple	Auckland University Press	A Sort of Conscience: The Wakefields	2003
Tony Hughes-D'Aeth	Melbourne University Press	Paper Nation: The Story of the Picturesque Atlas of Australasia 1886-1888	2002 (shared)
James Belich	Penguin Press	Paradise Reforged: A History of the New Zealanders from the 1880s to the Year 2000	2002 (shared)
David Walker	University of Queensland Press	Anxious Nation: Australia and the Rise of Asia 1850-1939	2001
Ken Inglis	Melbourne University Press	Sacred Places. War Memorials in the Australian Landscape	1999
Anne Salmond	University of Hawaii Press	Between Worlds. Early Exchanges between Maoris and Europeans, 1773-1815	1998
Tom Griffiths	Cambridge University Press	Hunters and Collectors: the Antiquarian Imagination in Australia	1996-97
David Goodman	Allen & Unwin	Gold Seeking Victoria and California in the 1850s	1994-95
Judith Brett	Macmillan Australia	Robert Menzies' Forgotten People	1992-93
Anne Salmond	University of Hawaii Press	Two Worlds: First Meetings Between Maori and European 1642-1772	1990-91
Alan Atkinson	Oxford University Press	Camden: Farm and Village Life in Early New South Wales	1988-89
Patrick O'Farrell	UNSW Press	The Irish in Australia	1986-87
Janet McCalman	Melbourne University Press	Struggletown: Public and Private Life in Richmond 1900-1965	1984-85
Ken Inglis	Melbourne University Press	This is the ABC: The Australian Broadcasting Commission 1932-1983	1982-83
Henry Reynolds	James Cook University	The Other Side of the Frontier: An Interpretation of the Aboriginal Response to the Invasion and Settlement of Australia	1980-81
Graeme Davison	Melbourne University Press	The Rise and Fall of Marvellous Melbourne	1978-79 (shared)
Weston Bate	Melbourne University Press	Lucky City: The First Generation at Ballarat 1851-1951	1978-79 (shared)
John Rickard	ANU Press	Class and Politics: New South Wales, Victoria and the Early Commonwealth, 1890-1910	1976-77
Max Crawford	Sydney University Press	A Bit of A Rebel: The Life and Work of George Arnold Wood	1974-75
John La Nauze	Melbourne University Press	The Making of the Australian Constitution	1972-73
Geoffrey Serle	Melbourne University Press	The rush to be rich : a history of the colony of Victoria, 1883-1889	1970-71 (shared)
Paul Hasluck	Australian War Memorial	The Government and the People 1942-45 Australian War Memorial	1970-71 (shared)
Manning Clark	Melbourne University Press	A History of Australia Vol 2: New South Wales and Van Dieman's Land 1822-1838	1968-69
Douglas H Pike	Melbourne University Press	Australian Dictionary of Biography - Vols. 1 & 2	1966-67
John La Nauze	Melbourne University Press	Alfred Deakin: A biography	1964-65
Geoffrey Serle	Melbourne University Press	The Golden Age: A History of the Colony of Victoria 1851-61	1962-63 (shared)
Manning Clark	Melbourne University Press	A History of Australia, Vol. 1, from the Earliest Times to the Age of Macquarie	1962-63 (shared)
Bernard Smith	Oxford University Press	European vision and the South Pacific, 1768-1850 : a study in the history of art and ideas	1960-61
Keith Sinclair	Penguin & New Zealand University Press	A History of New Zealand & The Origin of the Maori Wars	1958-59 (shared)
Russel Ward	Oxford University Press	The Australian Legend	1958-59 (shared)
Geoffrey Blainey	Melbourne University Press	The Peaks of Lyell	1955
J. S. Gregory	University of Melbourne	Thesis: Church and state in Victoria (1851-72) : a study in the development of secular principles of government as revealed by the abolition of State aid to religion and to denominational education in Victoria	1952
A. H. McLintock	Otago Centennial Publications	History of Otago: The Origins and Growth of a Wakefield Class Settlement	1949
J. D. Legge	University of Melbourne/University of Oxford	Thesis: Survey of Papuan Administration	1946
Joy E. Parnaby	University of Melbourne	Thesis: Sir Charles Gavan Duffy in Victoria	1943

== The Allan Martin Award ==
This biennial award has been named for A. W. Martin (1926–2002) and is administered jointly by the Australian National University and the Australian Historical Association. The award is to encourage "early career historians" for work relating to Australian History. Submissions for this award are those prepared for publication and can be in any form, e.g. a monograph, a series of academic articles, an exhibition or documentary film, or some mix of these. Seven women and six men have won the prize, with one non-white winner.

Winner	Book / Project	Year awarded
Izabella Nantsou	Stage Rights: Actors Equity and the Industrial History of Australian Performers	2026
Amy Way	Reclaiming Deep History in Carnarvon Gorge, Queensland	2025
Ebony Nilsson	Russians Among Us: A cultural history of the Petrov affair	2024
Rohan Howitt	Undiscovering Emerald Island: Phantom Islands and Environmental Knowledge in Australia’s Southern Ocean World, 1821–1930	2023
Ben Huf	The Economy Is Not A Theory: The Politics of Prosperity in Australia	2023
Xu Daozhi	Chinese Perspectives on Indigenous People in Chinese Australian Newspapers, 1894-1937	2022
Annemarie McLaren	When the Strangers Come to Stay: Aboriginal-Colonial Exchanges and the Negotiation of New South Wales, 1788-1835	2021
Alexandra Dellios	Remembering Migrant Protest and Activism: the Migrant Rights Movement in pre-Multicultural Australia	2020 (shared)
Mike Jones	Culture, common law, and science: representing deep human history in Australian museums	2020 (shared)
André Brett	Scars in the Country: An Enviro-Economic History of Railways in Australasia, 1850–1914	2019 (shared)
Iain Johnston-White	The Dominions and British Maritime Power in the Second World War	2019 (shared)
Peter Hobbins	An intimate pandemic: Fostering community histories of the 1918–19 influenza pandemic centenary	2018
Benjamin Mountford	A Global History of Australian Gold	2017
Ruth Morgan	Australindia: Australia, India and the Ecologies of Empire, 1788–1901	2016
Amanda (now Andy) Kaladelfos	Immigration, Violence and Australian Postwar Politics	2014
Melissa Bellanta	Racial Crossings: Race, Intermarriage, and Victorian British Empire	2012
Not awarded	"No application of sufficient merit was received."	2010
Fred Cahir	Black gold: aboriginal peoples and gold in Victoria 1850-1870	2008
Not awarded	Reason unknown	2006
Maria Nugent	Botany Bay: Where Histories Meet	2004

== Blackwell AHA Prize ==
The publishers, Blackwell Publishing Asia, have sponsored a prize for the best postgraduate paper at a Regional Conference.

The AHA information states that the "prize will be judged on two criteria: 1) oral presentation of the paper 2) written version of the conference paper. The written version of the conference paper (not a longer version) is to be submitted at the start of the conference. The winner of the prize will be announced at the close of the conference."

- 2007 Winners

Melissa Bellanta (University of Sydney) for Raiders of the Lost Civilisation, or, Adventure-Romances of the Australian Desert, 1890-1907, and
Nell Musgrove (University of Melbourne) for Private Homes, Public Scrutiny: Surveillance of 'the family' in postwar Melbourne

== WK Hancock Prize ==
The WK Hancock Prize is run by Australian Historical Association (AHA) with the Department of Modern History, Macquarie University. It was instituted in 1987 in honour of Sir Keith Hancock and his life achievements.

The award is for the first book of history by an Australian scholar and for research using original sources. It is awarded biennially for a first book published in the preceding two years with the award presented at the AHA's National Biennial Conference.

- 2004 Winners

Mary Anne Jebb for Blood, Sweat and Welfare: a History of White Bosses and Aboriginal Pastoral Workers (UWA Press, 2002)citation
Warwick Anderson for The Cultivation of Whiteness: Science, Health and Racial Destiny in Australia (Melbourne University Press, 2002)

  - Highly Commended

John Connor for The Australian Frontier Wars: 1788-1838 (University of New South Wales Press)
Brigid Hains for The Ice and the Inland: Mawson, Flynn, and the Myth of the Frontier (Melbourne University Press)

- 2006 Winner Tony Roberts for Frontier Justice: A History of the Gulf Country to 1900 (UQP, 2005)
  - Highly Commended

Maria Nugent for Botany Bay: Where Histories Meet (Allen & Unwin, 2005)
Sue Taffe for Black and White Together, FCAATSI 1958-1972 (UQP, 2005)

- 2008 Winner:

Robert Kenny for The Lamb enters the Dreaming: Nathaniel Pepper and the Ruptured World (Scribe Publications, 2007)

  - 2008 Highly Commended

Tracey Banivanua-Mar for Violence and Colonial Dialogue: The Australian-Pacific Indentured Labor Trade (University of Hawaii Press, 2007)

- 2010 Winner:

Dr Natasha Campo for From Superwomen to Domestic Goddesses: the rise and fall of Feminism Peter Lang, 2009

  - 2010 Commendation

Dr Clare Corbould for Becoming African Americans" Black Public Life in Harlem, 1919-1939 Harvard University Press, 2009

- 2012 Joint Winners

Frances M Clarke for War Stories: Suffering and Sacrifice in the Civil War North

Ian Coller for Arab France: Islam and the Making of Modern Europe, 1798-1831

  - 2012 Commendation

Michael L. Ondaatje for Black Conservative Intellectuals in Modern America

- 2014 Winner:

Janet Butler for Kitty's War: The Remarkable Wartime Experiences of Kit McNaughton (University of Queensland Press, 2013)

- 2016 Winner:

Adam Clulow for The Company and The Shogun: The Dutch Encounter with Tokugawa Japan (Columbia University Press, 2014)

  - 2016 Highly Commended

Ruth Morgan for Running Out? Water in Western Australia (UWA Publishing, 2015)

- 2018 Winner:

Miranda Johnson for The Land Is Our History: Indigeneity, Law, and the Settler State (Oxford University Press)

- 2020 Winner:

Laura Rademaker for Found in Translation: Many Meanings on a North Australian Mission (University of Hawai’i Press)

- 2022 Winner:

Jason Gibson, Ceremony Men: Making Ethnography and the Return of the Strehlow Collection (SUNY Press)

- 2024 Winner:

Alecia Simmonds, Courting: An Intimate History of Love and the Law (La Trobe University Press, 2023)

- 2026 Winner:

Emily Gallagher, Playtime: A History of Australian Childhood (La Trobe University Press, 2025)

== The Jill Roe Prize ==
The Jill Roe Prize is awarded annually to a postgraduate student for the best unpublished article of historical research. It was inaugurated in 2014 in honour of the late Jill Roe.

- 2014: Chris Holdridge for The Pageantry of the Anti-Convict Cause: Colonial Loyalism and Settler Celebrations in Tasmania and Cape Colony (published in History Australia 12, No. 1, April 2015)
- 2015: No prize awarded
- 2016: James H. Dunk for The Liability of Colonial Madness: Jonathan Burke Hugo in Port Dalrymple, Sydney and Calcutta, 1812
- 2017: James Findlay for Cinematic Landscapes, Dark Tourism and the Ghosts of Port Arthur
- 2019: No prize awarded
- 2020: Karen Twigg, Dust, dryness and departure: constructions of masculinity and femininity during the WWII drought
- 2021: Jessica Urwin, "The old colonial power can stand proxy": The Royal Commission into British Nuclear Tests in Australia and the politics of the 1980s
- 2022: Catherine Gay, All the perils of the ocean: Girls' emotions on voyages to Australia, 1851–1884
- 2023: Harrison Croft, "'Are You Happy Now?': Gauging Streams and Building Postwar Victoria from the Periphery"
- 2024: Zoe Smith, "'Domestic tyranny' and 'petty despotism': Historicising coercive control in late-nineteenth- and early-twentieth-century Australia"
- 2025: Saskia Roberts, "'The most education I got during that year': Australian girls, sexual knowledge and the 'where' of reading, 1970–2010"
- 2026: Ingrid Ryan, "A modern vision for a 'prehistoric' landscape: Mary Cecil Allen's new vision for central Australia and its international foundations"

== The John Barrett Award for Australian Studies ==
The John Barrett Award for Australian Studies is for the best written article published in the Journal of Australian Studies in the categories: the best article by a scholar (open) and the best article by a scholar (post-graduate). Dr. Barrett, then Reader in history at La Trobe University, made a donation of $5000 in 1987 for any article in the Journal that was deemed by a panel of three judges to be of a ‘suitable standard’. The prize was dormant from 1995 until 2008.

Winner	Article	Year (of article)
Joe Rich	G.W.L. Marshall-Hall and the Meaning of Indecency in Late Victorian Melbourne	1988
Chilla Bulbeck	Australian History Set in Concrete. The influence of the New Histories on Australian memorial construction	1991
Heather Goodall	‘“The Whole Truth and Nothing But…” Some interactions of Western law, Aboriginal history and community memory	1992
Ann McGrath	‘“Beneath the Skin”: Australian citizenship, rights and Aboriginal women’	1993
Agnieksza Sobcinska	Australian Fellow-travellers to China: devotion and deceit in the People's Republic	2008 (postgraduate)
Melissa Bellanta	A man of civic sentiment: the case of William Guthrie Spence	2008
Jen Hawksley	“In the shadow of war”: Australian parents and the legacy of loss 1915–35	2009 (postgraduate)
Jessie Mitchell	“The galling yoke of slavery”; race and separation in colonial Port Phillip	2009
Alana Piper	A growing vice’: the Truth about Brisbane girls and drunkenness in the early twentieth century	2010 (postgraduate)
Jonathon Bollen	‘Don't Give Up the Strip!: erotic performance as live entertainment in mid-twentieth century Australia	2010 (joint)
Julie Kimber	“A nuisance to the community": policing the vagrant woman	2010 (joint)
Jessica Neath	Empty Lands: contemporary art approaches to photographing historical trauma in Tasmania	2012 (postgraduate)
Zoe Anderson	Borders, babies and “good refugees”: Australian representations of “illegal” immigration, 1979	2012
Lyndall Ryan	The Black Line in Van Diemen's Land (Tasmania), 1830	2013
Nathan Garvey	“Folkalising" Convicts: A ‘Botany Bay’ Ballad and its Cultural Contexts	2014
Chelsea Barnett	Man's Man: Representations of Australian Post-War Masculinity in Man Magazine	2015 (postgraduate)
Kumi Kato	Australia's Whaling Discourse: Global Norm, Green Consciousness and Identity	2015
Catherine Austin and Farida Fozdar	“Team Australia": Cartoonists Challenging Exclusionary Nationalist Discourse	2017
Jan Cooper	In the Beginning Were Words: Aboriginal People and the Franchise	2018
Pete Walsh	The Blurred Space: Reading the Body Politic in Christos Tsiolkas's The Slap and The Jesus Man	2022 (postgraduate)
Michelle Arrow	“Smash Sexist Movies": Gender, Culture and Ocker Cinema in 1970s Australia	2022
C. J. Coventry	Sedimentary Layers: Bob Hawke's Beer World Record and Ocker Chic	2023 (postgraduate)
Jordana Silverstein	Files, Families and the Nation: An Archival History, Perhaps	2023

== The Kay Daniels Award ==
Inaugurated in 2004, this award is named for Kay Daniels (1941–2001), historian and public servant, and recognises her interest in colonial and heritage history.

The biennial award will be administered by The Australian Historical Association.

- 2004: Lucy Frost and Hamish Maxwell-Stuart (eds) for Chain Letters: Narrating Convict Lives (Melbourne University Press)
- 2006: Trudy Mae Cowley for A Drift of 'Derwent Ducks: Lives of the 200 Female Irish Convicts Transported on the Australasia from Dublin to Hobart in 1849 (Research Tasmania, Hobart, 2005)Review
- 2008: Kirsty Reid for Gender, Crime and Empire: Convicts, Settlers and the State in Early Colonial Australia
- 2010: Hamish Maxwell-Stuart for Closing Hell's Gates: the Death of a Convict Station (Allen & Unwin 2008)
- 2014: Kristyn Harman for Aboriginal Convicts: Australian, Khoisan and Maori Exiles,(UNSW Press 2012)
- 2016: Sue Castrique for Under the Colony's Eye: Gentlemen and Convicts on Cockatoo Island 1839–1869 (Anchor Books Australia, 2014)
- 2018: Joan Kavanagh and Dianne Snowden for Van Diemen's Women: A History of Transportation to Tasmania (The History Press Ltd)
- 2020: Hilary Carey for Empire of Hell. Religion and the Campaign to End Convict Transportation in the British Empire, 1788–1875 (Cambridge University Press, 2019)
- 2022: Bill Bell for Crusoe's Books: Readers in the Empire of Print 1800-1918 (Oxford University Press)
- 2024: Clare Anderson, Convicts: A Global History (Cambridge University Press, 2022)
- 2026: Alistair Scott, Urchin Convicts: The Point Puer Boys in Van Diemen’s Land (Forty South Publishing, 2025)

== The Serle Award ==
The Serle Award was first presented in 2002. The award was established through the generosity of Mrs Jessie Serle for the historian Geoffrey Serle (1922–1998).

The Serle Award is for the best thesis by an "early career researcher" and will be payable on receipt of publisher's proofs, which must be within twelve months of notification of the award. The biennial award will be administered by The Australian Historical Association.

Winner	University	Thesis	Year awarded
James Watson	Australian National University	Fibro Modernity: A Social History of Asbestos in Australia, 1878-2024	2026
Emily Gallagher	Australian National University	The Childhood Imagination in Australia, 1890-1940	2024
Karen Twigg	La Trobe University	Along Tyrrell Creek: An Environmental History of a Mallee Community	2022
Annemarie McLaren	Australian National University	Negotiating Entanglement: Reading Aboriginal- Colonial Exchanges in Early New South Wales, 1788 – 1835	2020
Anne (now Yves) Rees	Australian National University	Travelling to Tomorrow: Australian Women in the United States, 1910–1960	2018
Laura Rademaker	Australian National University	Language and the Mission: Talking and Translating on Groote Eylandt, 1943–1973	2016
Carolyn Holbrook	University of Melbourne	The Great War in the Australian Imagination Since 1915	2014
Bill Garner	University of Melbourne	Land of Camps: The Ephemeral Settlement of Australia	2012
Simon Sleight	Monash University	The Territories of Youth: Young People and Public Space in Melbourne, c.1870-1901	2010
Marina Larsson	La Trobe University	The Burdens of Sacrifice: War Disability in Australian Families 1914–1939	2008
Jessie Mitchell	Australian National University	Flesh, Dreams and Spirit: Life on Aboriginal Mission Stations 1825–1850 A History of Cross-Cultural Connections	2006
Bartolo Ziino	University of Melbourne	A Distant Grief: Australians, War Graves and the Great Wa	2005

== See also ==
- New South Wales Premier's History Awards
- List of Australian literary awards
- List of history awards
- Victorian Community History Awards
- Northern Territory History Awards
- Prime Minister's Prize for Australian History
- Magarey Medal for biography
