= Graeme Davison =

Australian historian, academic and author

- Born: Melbourne
- Awards: Officer of the Order of Australia (2011); Ernest Scott Prize (1979); Fellow of the Academy of the Social Sciences in Australia; Fellow of the Australian Academy of the Humanities

Academic background
- Education: University of Melbourne (BA [Hons]); University of Oxford; Australian National University (Ph.D)
- Thesis: 'The Rise and Fall of "Marvellous Melbourne" 1880–1895' (1969)
- Doctoral advisor: John Andrew La Nauze

Academic work
- Institutions: Monash University; University of Melbourne
- Main interests: social history, cultural history
- Notable works: The Rise and Fall of Marvellous Melbourne (1979); The Use and Abuse of Australian History (2000)

Graeme John Davison, AO, FASSA, FAHA (born 1940) is an Australian historian who is the Sir John Monash Distinguished Professor in the School of Historical Studies at Monash University, Melbourne, Australia. He is best known for his work on Australian urban history. Davison won the prestigious Ernest Scott Prize in 1979 for The Rise and Fall of Marvellous Melbourne.

== Early life and education ==
Davison was born to a Methodist family that viewed itself as being of "modest respectability".

Davison received a Bachelor of Arts from the University of Melbourne where he was a resident at Ormond College and then attended the University of Oxford as part of his Rhodes Scholarship. Returned to Australia in the mid-1960s, Davison received his PhD from the Australian National University in 1969 for his thesis,The Rise and Fall of "Marvellous Melbourne" 1880–1895 under the supervision of John Andrew La Nauze and F. B. Smith. He was married by the time he completed his thesis.

== Academic career ==
Davison turned his doctoral thesis into a book in 1979, which won the Ernest Scott Prize. His supervisor, La Nauze, had won the same prize for a second time in 1973. After teaching at Melbourne University, Davison began lecturing at Monash University in 1982 as the Sir John Monash Distinguished Professor in the School of Historical Studies.

In his academic career Davison has written or co-written over ten books, over 30 peer-reviewed articles, 28 book chapters and edited three books. He has developed a reputation as "one of Australia’s leading experts on the elusive notion of national identity". He is often interviewed and his work is quoted in the news media on topics ranging from rural history to the history of home ownership.

== Bibliography ==
=== Books ===
- Davison, Graeme (1993). The Unforgiving Minute: How Australia learned to tell the time. Melbourne: Oxford University Press. ISBN 9780195534962.
- — (2000). The use and abuse of Australian history. Sydney: Allen & Unwin. ISBN 1864487208.
- Davison, Graeme; John Hirst & Stuart Macintyre, eds. (2001). The Oxford Companion to Australian History. Melbourne: Oxford University Press. ISBN 019551503X.
- Davison, Graeme (2004). Car Wars: How the Car Won Our Hearts and Conquered our Cities. Crows Nest, New South Wales: Allen & Unwin. ISBN 1741142075.
- — (2012). University Unlimited: The Monash Story. Crows Nest, New South Wales: Allen & Unwin. ISBN 9781742378664.
- — (2014). Trendyville: The Battle for Australia's Inner Cities. Clayton, Victoria: Monash University Publishing. ISBN 9781921867422.
- — (2014) [1978]. The Rise And Fall Of Marvellous Melbourne. Melbourne: Melbourne University Publishing. ISBN 9780522866797.
- — (2015). Lost Relations: Fortunes of My Family in Australia's Golden Age. Crows Nest, New South Wales: Allen & Unwin. ISBN 9781743319468.
- — (2016). City Dreamers: The Urban Imagination in Australia. Sydney: NewSouth Publishing. ISBN 9781742234694.

=== Book reviews ===
Year	Review article	Work(s) reviewed
2022	Davison, Graeme (October 2022). "The spirit of place : a timely antidote to cultural amnesia". Australian Book Review. 447: 30–31.	Davidson, Jim (2022). Emperors in Lilliput : Clem Christesen of Meanjin and Stephen Murray-Smith of Overland. Carlton, Vic.: The Miegunyah Press.
