= John Rickard (historian) =

Australian historian (1935–2024)

John Rickard FAHA
- Born: John David Rickard; 9 February 1935
- Died: 26 July 2024 (aged 89); Melbourne, Victoria, Australia
- Awards: Ernest Scott Prize, 1977; The Age Book of the Year, 1984

Academic background
- Thesis: Class and Politics: New South Wales, Victoria and the Early Commonwealth, 1890‐1910 (1973)
- Doctoral advisor: Geoffrey Serle

Academic work
- Institutions: Monash University, Harvard University
- Main interests: Australian studies
- Website: https://research.monash.edu/en/persons/john-rickard

John David Rickard FAHA (9 February 1935 – 26 July 2024) was an Australian historian who served as Professor of Australian Studies at Monash University from 1995 to 1998 and the visiting professor of Australian Studies at Harvard University from 1997 to 1998. Rickard won the prestigious Ernest Scott Prize in 1977 for his book Class and Politics: New South Wales, Victoria and the Early Commonwealth, 1890‐1910.

== Biography ==
Rickard was born on 9 February 1935 and was raised in Sydney, New South Wales. An undergraduate at the University of Sydney (BA, 1955), Rickard read political science and economics at the University of Oxford (1957) before becoming a singer and stage actor in London, appearing in the 1962 stage production of Fiorello!. Rickard returned to Australia for the 1962 production of The King and I in Melbourne and became a lecturer in the Department of History at Monash University, completing his doctoral studies there (1973). He was subsequently promoted to senior lecturer (1978), reader (1986) and finally Professor of Australian Studies from 1995 to 1998.

Rickard was editor of the Australian Historical Studies journal from 1990 to 1994, during which time he compiled essays from leading academics into a special edition (1991). He was also the visiting professor of Australian Studies at Harvard University from 1997 to 1998 and the Monash Visiting Fellow of Australian Studies at the University of Copenhagen in 2007.

Rickard's 1973 thesis became the 1976 book Class and Politics: New South Wales, Victoria and the Early Commonwealth, 1890–1910, which won the Ernest Scott Prize that year. His 1984 biography of judge H. B. Higgins was named The Age newspaper's Non-Fiction Book of the Year. Two other works were critically acclaimed: one on the home life of Prime Minister Alfred Deakin (1996), and Australia: A Cultural History (1988), which remains the only short cultural history of that country, written when the field itself was in its infancy.

In 1991, Rickard was elected a Fellow of the Australian Academy of the Humanities and served as emeritus Professor at Monash from 2015 until his death.

A lifelong patron and commentator on the performing arts, Rickard was director of the Monash theatre from 1974 to 1976 and chaired the Alexander Theatre Committee in 1979. He was also president of the Green Room Awards from 1985 to 1990. Upon his death in lieu of flowers Rickard requested donations be made to the Melbourne Opera.

Rickard died aged 89 on 26 July 2024 after a short stay at Caulfield Hospital in Melbourne. His requiem mass was held on 9 August at the Anglo-Catholic St Mary's Anglican Church, where he was an active parishioner.

== Selected works ==
=== Thesis ===
- Rickard, John (1973). Class and Politics: New South Wales, Victoria and the Early Commonwealth, 1890–1910 (PhD thesis). Monash University.

=== Books ===
- Rickard, John (1976). Class and Politics: New South Wales, Victoria and the Early Commonwealth, 1890–1910. ANU Press. ISBN 9780708106433.
- — (1984). H. B. Higgins: The Rebel as Judge. Allen & Unwin. ISBN 978-0868616810.
- — (1988). Australia: A Cultural History. Monash University Publishing. ISBN 978-1921867606.
- —; Spearritt, Peter, eds. (1991). Packaging The Past?: Public Histories. Melbourne University Press. ISBN 978-0522844580.
- — (1992). A Family Romance: The Deakins at Home. Melbourne University Press. ISBN 978-0522847406.
- — (2013). An Imperial Affair: Portrait of an Australian Marriage. Monash University Publishing. ISBN 978-1922235275.
