= Michelle Arrow =

Australian historian, academic and author

Michelle Arrow FASSA FRHistS
- Awards: Ernest Scott Prize (2020); John Barrett Award (2023); NSW Premier's Digital History Prize (2014)

Academic background
- Education: University of Sydney (BA [Hons]); University of Sydney (Ph.D)
- Thesis: 'Written Into History : a social and cultural history of Australian women playwrights, 1928-1968' (1999)

Academic work
- Institutions: Macquarie University
- Main interests: cultural history, social history, political history
- Notable works: The Seventies: The personal, the political and the making of modern Australia (2019); Friday on our minds : popular culture in Australia since 1945 (2009)

Michelle Arrow FASSA FRHistS is an Australian historian, academic and author who is currently a Professor of History at Macquarie University in Sydney, Australia. She is best known for her work on Australia in the 1970s. Arrow won the Ernest Scott Prize in 2020 for The Seventies: The personal, the political and the making of modern Australia. Arrow is the vice-president of the Australian Historical Association.

== Early life and education ==
Arrow graduated from the University of Sydney with a Bachelor of Arts (hons) and received her PhD in history from the same university in 1999. Her thesis was a social and cultural history of Australian women playwrights between 1928 and 1968, including Gwen Meredith.

== Academic career ==
Arrow's first academic work was an article in the Journal of Australian Studies in 1998. Her first book, Upstaged : Australian women dramatists in the limelight at last, was published in 2002. It expanded on the work undertaken for her doctoral thesis. Upstaged discusses Australia's largely forgotten women playwrights, demonstrating their popularity and political importance. In the early 2000s Arrow was an Australian Broadcasting Corporation radio and television presenter, including the "failed ABC TV history experiment, Rewind."

From 2008 to 2012, Arrow was one of the five members of the advisory panel for the Prime Minister's Prize for Australian History, serving alongside John Hirst, Joan Beaumont and Geoffrey Blainey. In 2009, her second book Friday on Our Minds: Popular Culture in Australia Since 1945 was published. It was shortlisted for the New South Wales Premier's Australian History Prize.

In 2014, Arrow and her colleagues won the NSW Premier's Digital History Prize for their 2013 radio documentary Public Intimacies: The 1974 Royal Commission on Human Relationships, discussing the three commissioners (Anne Deveson, Elizabeth Evatt, and Felix Arnott), the commission and its findings. This documentary was funded by the 2012 Frederick Watson Fellowship.

In 2019, Arrow's third book was published, The Seventies: The personal, the political and the making of modern Australia. The book was awarded the Ernest Scott Prize in 2020.

Arrow was elected a Fellow of the Academy of the Social Sciences in Australia in 2023 and Fellow of the Royal Historical Society in 2025.

== Bibliography ==
=== Author ===
- — (2003). Upstaged: Australian women dramatists in the limelight at last. Strawberry Hills, New South Wales: Currency Press. ISBN 0868196908.
- — (2009). Friday on Our Minds: Popular Culture in Australia Since 1945. Sydney: UNSW Press. ISBN 9780868406626.
- — (2019). The Seventies: The personal, the political and the making of modern Australia. Sydney: UNSW Press. ISBN 9781742234700.
- Boucher, Leigh; Baird, Barbara; Arrow, Michelle; Reynolds, Robert (2024). Personal Politics: Sexuality, Gender and the Remaking of Citizenship in Australia. Monash University Publishing. ISBN 9781922979605.
