= Ernest Scott =

Australian historian (1867–1939)

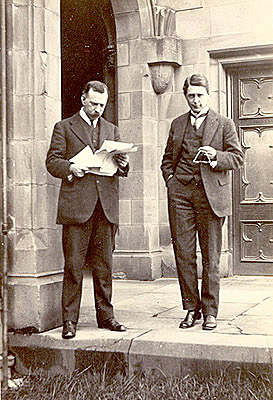
- Scott (left) and William Harrison Moore photographed in the Quadrangle of the Old Law building, University of Melbourne, c. 1914–1918
- Born: 21 June 1867; Northampton, England
- Died: 6 December 1939
- Spouses: Mabel Emily Besant (1892-1915); Emily Scott (1916-39)
- Children: Muriel (1893-1924)

Academic work
- Institutions: University of Melbourne (1913–36)
- Notable students: W. K. Hancock; Manning Clark; Stephen Henry Roberts
- Main interests: Australian history
- Notable works: The Life of Captain Matthew Flinders, R.N.; Short History of Australia

Sir Ernest Scott (21 June 1867 – 6 December 1939) was an Australian historian and professor of history at the University of Melbourne from 1913 to 1936.

== Early life ==
Scott was born in Northampton, England, on 21 June 1867, the son of Hannah Scott, a housekeeper; William Scott, civil engineer, was cited as his father when Ernest married. Ernest Scott was educated at St Katherine's Church of England School, Northampton and worked as a journalist on the London Globe. On 7 May 1892 Scott married Mabel Emily Besant, daughter of Rev. Frank and Annie Besant, the theosophist; they had one child, Muriel (1893–1924).

== Career ==
In 1892 Scott (who began to call himself Besant-Scott at his wife's insistence) migrated to Australia, where he joined the staff of The Herald newspaper, edited the Austral Theosophist (established by Isabel Cooper-Oakley) which appeared from January 1894 to February 1895, and lectured. Around 1896 Mabel converted to Roman Catholicism and became estranged from her husband, although they continued nominal cohabitation. Scott subsequently abandoned theosophy. Mabel returned to England in 1909, taking their daughter Muriel, but Scott did not sue for divorce until 1915. On 25 May in Melbourne, Scott married to Bendigo-born Emily Illinden Fortuna, sister of Edward Dyason. They had no children.

From 1895 to 1901 Scott was a member of the Victorian Hansard staff, and from 1901 to 1914 was on the Commonwealth Hansard staff. After the publication of Terre Napoléon: A History of French Explorations and Projects in Australia (London, 1910), Laperouse (Sydney, 1912) and The Life of Captain Matthew Flinders (Sydney, 1914), Scott's reputation as a historian was established.

In 1913 Scott was appointed professor of history at the University of Melbourne. Future professors of history who passed through Scott's school included (Sir) Keith Hancock, Fred Alexander, Marnie Bassett, (Sir) Stephen Henry Roberts, Manning Clark, N. D. Harper and A. G. B. Fisher of Christchurch.

Scott's other works included A Short History of Australia (1916), Men and Thought in Modern History (1916), History and Historical Problems (1925), Australian Discovery (1929) and in 1933 appeared volume VII of The Cambridge History of the British Empire, edited and partly written by Scott. Australia During the War, being volume XI of The Official History of Australia in the War of 1914–1918, appeared in 1936. Scott retired in 1936, was knighted in June 1939 and died of a coronary thrombosis on 6 December 1939.

== Legacy ==
Scott's widow Emily Scott donated money to the University of Melbourne to establish the Ernest Scott Prize for History, which is awarded annually for the most distinguished contribution to the history of Australia or New Zealand.

=== The Scott lineage of historians ===
Lines of historians in Australia can be traced to Scott at the University of Melbourne. Among his undergraduate students were future historians Manning Clark and W. K. Hancock. Clark later went on to teach a third generation of historians which included Geoffrey Blainey, Geoffrey Serle, Ken Inglis, and Michael Roe. This generation would "transform the writing of Australian history over the following five decades." A fourth generation was taught by Blainey, including Janet McCalman and Stuart Macintyre. Inglis taught Bill Gammage and Hank Nelson. Among Macintyre's former undergraduate students was Frank Bongiorno.
