= Grace Karskens =

Australian historian

Professor Grace Karskens FRSN FASSA FAHA
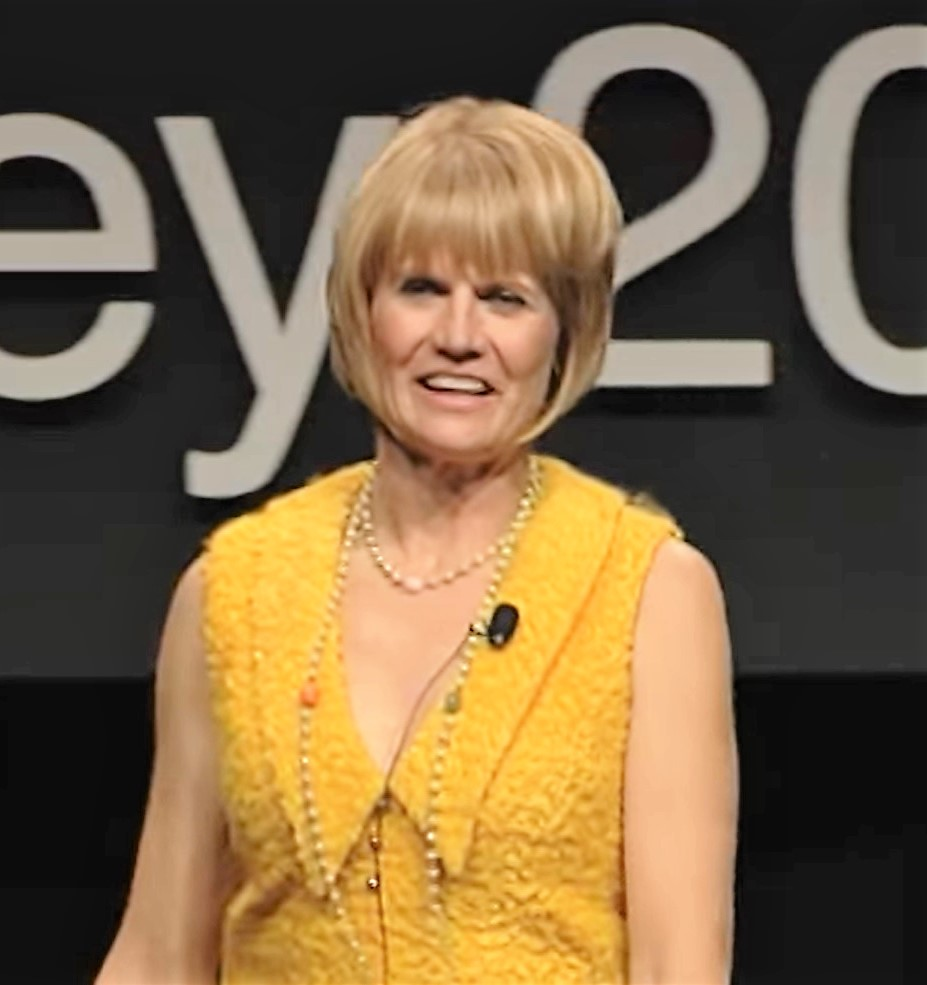
- Karskens in 2011
- Born: 12 March 1958 (age 68); Sydney, New South Wales, Australia
- Awards: New South Wales Premier's Community and Regional History Prize (1998); Fellow of the Australian Academy of the Humanities (2010); Prime Minister's Literary Award for Non-Fiction (2010); Calibre Prize (2019); Prime Minister's Literary Award for Australian History (2021)

Academic background
- Education: University of Sydney
- Thesis: The Rocks and Sydney: Society, Culture and Material Life 1788–c.1830 (1995)

Academic work
- Discipline: Australian history
- Institutions: University of New South Wales
- Notable works: The Rocks: Life in Early Sydney (1998); The Colony: A History of Early Sydney (2009)

Grace Elizabeth Karskens (born 12 March 1958) is an Australian historian who is professor of history at the University of New South Wales.

== Career ==
Grace Elizabeth Karskens, born in Sydney, New South Wales in 1958, graduated from the University of Sydney with degrees in both history and historical archaeology. She was awarded a Master of Arts in 1986, and a Doctor of Philosophy from the University of Sydney in 1995.

Before taking up a position as lecturer at the University of New South Wales in 2001, Karskens worked on heritage and archaeological projects on a contract basis and researched and published a number of books.

In 2012 Karskens was appointed a Carson Fellow at the Rachel Carson Center for Environment and Society for her project on the Penrith Lakes and Castlereagh, New South Wales.

Karskens is a member of the Reserve Bank of Australia's Design Advisory Panel, which oversees the development and production of banknotes. She was a trustee of the Historic Houses Trust of New South Wales (now Sydney Living Museums) and the Dictionary of Sydney.

== Awards and honours ==
Karskens is a Fellow of the Royal Society of New South Wales. She was elected Fellow of the Australian Academy of the Humanities in 2010 and Fellow of the Academy of the Social Sciences in Australia in 2022.

Karskens won the New South Wales Premier's Community and Regional History Prize for The Rocks in 1998. She was shortlisted for the 2009 Prime Minister's Prize for Australian History for The Colony, for which she won the Non-Fiction award at the 2010 Prime Minister's Literary Awards. The Colony was also awarded the Best Book 2009–2010 (non-North American) by the Urban History Association (USA).

Karskens was awarded the Coral Thomas Fellowship at the State Library of New South Wales in 2018 to develop her project, The Real Secret River, Dyarubbin. She also received the 2019 Calibre Prize by the Australian Book Review for her essay "Nah Doongh's Song".

People of the River won the 2021 NSW Premier's Australian History Prize and the 2021 Prime Minister's Prize for Australian History. It was shortlisted for the Nonfiction prize at the 2021 Indie Book Awards.

== Works ==
- An Historical and Archaeological Study of Cox's Road and Early Crossings of the Blue Mountains, New South Wales, (also known as Cox's Way) Bicentennial Project Unit, Crown Lands Office, 1988, ISBN 0730555550
- Holroyd: A Social History of Western Sydney, NSW University Press, 1991, ISBN 0868401080
- The Rocks: Life in Early Sydney, Melbourne University Press, 1998, ISBN 0522848443
- Four Essays about the Great North Road, Wirrimbirra Workshop, 1998, ISBN 0958569703
- Inside the Rocks: The Archaeology of a Neighbourhood, Hale & Iremonger, 1999, ISBN 0868066664
- The Colony: A History of Early Sydney, Allen & Unwin, 2009, ISBN 9781741756371
- People of the River: Lost worlds of early Australia, Allen & Unwin, 2020, ISBN 9781760292232
