= Janet McCalman =

Australian historian

Janet McCalman AC, FAHA, FASSA
- Born: 5 December 1948 (age 77); Richmond, Victoria
- Awards: Victorian Premier's Award for Australian Studies (1984); Ernest Scott Prize (1985, 2022); Max Crawford Medal (1992); The Age Book of the Year (1993); The Age Non-fiction Book of the Year (1993); NSW Premier's History Awards in Community and Regional History (1999); Victorian Community and Local History Award (1999); Centenary Medal (2001)

Academic background
- Education: University of Melbourne (BA [Hons]); Australian National University (PhD)
- Thesis: Respectability and Working-Class Radicalism in Victorian London: 1850–1890: A Contribution to the Debate (1975)
- Doctoral advisor: F. B. Smith

Academic work
- Discipline: History
- Sub-discipline: Class history Gender history
- Institutions: University of Melbourne

Janet Susan McCalman, AC, FAHA, FASSA (born 5 December 1948) is an Australian social historian, population researcher and author at the Melbourne School of Population and Global Health, University of Melbourne. McCalman won the Ernest Scott Prize in 1985 and 2022 (shared); the second woman to have won and one of eight historians to have won the prize twice.

== Early life and education ==
McCalman was born in Richmond, Victoria, the daughter of industrial officer Laurie Brian McCalman and Hélène Ulrich. Her parents were members of the Communist Party of Australia. She won a scholarship to Methodist Ladies' College, Kew. At school, McCalman was head of the debate team and on the choir and yearbook committees. McCalman wrote polemics for the school yearbook in her final year (1966). One was in support of A. A. Phillips saying, 'We can only despair at the complacency of our politicians, for Australia does not educate her "democracy" and is severely inhibiting the flowering of her elite.' In another McCalman said, 'We are poised on the edge of our age of abundance, which through automation could free the human spirit from the shackles of material necessity and solve the problems of world poverty and illiteracy, yet the system is preparing us for subordination, selfishness, irrationality and meaninglessness.'

McCalman received a Bachelor of Arts with Honours from the University of Melbourne in 1970 and a Doctor of Philosophy in 1976 from the Australian National University for her thesis, "Respectability and Working-Class Radicalism in Victorian London: 1850–1890: A Contribution to the Debate". She did not commence a full-time professional academic career until 1993, when she took up a Fellowship at Melbourne University. McCalman became Reader in History in 2000 and then Head of the History and Philosophy department in 2001.

== Career ==
McCalman returned to the University of Melbourne in 1993 on a four-year Australian Research Council Fellowship. Since then she has fulfilled many roles within that university. Firstly she became a Senior Lecturer in the Centre for Health and Society. In 2000 she was appointed Reader in the History and Philosophy of Science at the same centre. She was appointed Professor in Public Health in 2003. Her work since 2011 has been at the Centre for Health and Society, in the Melbourne School of Population and Global Health.

McCalman gave the third Sir John Quick Bendigo Lecture in 1996. She spoke on "Towns and Gowns : The Humanities and the Community". La Trobe University established this annual lecture in recognition of Quick's work towards Federation and election as Bendigo's first Federal Member of Parliament.

Frank Moorhouse, in his 2004 Griffith Review essay, "Welcome back Bakunin – Life chances in Australia: some notes of discomfort", referred to McCalman's 1993 book, Journeyings as "classic study of privilege". By analysing the individuals in the Australian Who's Who 1998, McCalman showed that private schools dominated, that the "old boys club" prevailed.

== Personal life ==
McCalman received her PhD at ANU in 1976 and married the publisher Al Knight (1924-2013) on 15 December 1978, with whom she had two children. Knight's first book at Hyland House was Wendy Lowenstein's significant work of social history, Weevils in the Flour.

== Honours and recognition ==
- Fellow of the Australian Academy of the Humanities, 1993
- Walkley Awards for Journalism, short-listed for Editorial and Opinion category, 1997
- Media Award from the College of Educational Administration (Vic), for outstanding contribution to public discourse on education, 1999
- Centenary Medal, 2001, "for service to Australian society and the humanities in the study of the history of health"
- Fellow of the Academy of the Social Sciences in Australia, 2005
- Appointed honorary doctor by Umeå University, Sweden, 2015
- Awarded title, Redmond Barry Distinguished Professor, University of Melbourne, 2016.
- Companion of the Order of Australia (AC), 2018 Australia Day Honours, "for eminent service to education, particularly in the field of social history, as a leading academic, researcher and author, as a contributor to multi-disciplinary curriculum development, and through the promotion of history to the wider community."

== Publications ==
=== Books ===
- Struggletown: Public and Private Life in Richmond 1900–1965, Melbourne University Press, 1984, ISBN 0522842461; 2nd ed., Hyland House, 1998, ISBN 1864470488
- A hundred years at Bank Street: Ascot Vale State School, 1885–1985, with research by Janet Kershaw et al., Ascot Vale State School, 1985, ISBN 0958971609
- Who Went Where in Who's Who 1988: The Schooling of the Australian Elite, co-authored with Mark Peel, History Department, University of Melbourne, 1992, ISBN 0732503108
- The 1990 Journeyings survey: a statistical portrait of a middle-class generation, co-authored with Mark Peel, History Department, University of Melbourne, 1993, ISBN 0732506069
- Journeyings: The Biography of a Middle-Class Generation 1920–1990, Melbourne University Press, 1993, ISBN 052284569X
- Solid Bluestone Foundations and Rising Damp : The Fortunes of the Melbourne Middle Class, 1890–1990, History Department, University of Melbourne, 1994, ISBN 0732507081
- Sex and Suffering: Women's Health and a Women's Hospital, the Royal Women's Hospital, Melbourne 1856–1996, Melbourne University Press, 1998, ISBN 0522848370; Johns Hopkins University Press, 1999, ISBN 9780801862267
- On the World of the Sixty-Nine Tram, Melbourne University Publishing, 2006, ISBN 9780522852134
- Vandemonians: The Repressed History of Colonial Victoria, Melbourne University Publishing, 2021, ISBN 9780522877533

=== Chapters contributed ===
- "The originality of ordinary lives", in Creating Australia : Changing Australian History, edited by Wayne Hudson & Geoffrey Bolton, Allen & Unwin, 1997, ISBN 1863735607
- "Well-being in Australian Children", in No Time to Lose : The Wellbeing of Australia's Children, edited by Sue Richardson and Margot Prior, Melbourne University Publishing, 2005, ISBN 9780522852233
- "Blurred Visions", in Why Universities Matter : A Conversation About Values, Means and Directions, edited by Tony Coady. Allen & Unwin, 2000, ISBN 1865080381

== Literary awards ==
Year	Awards	Title	Publisher, year
1984	Victorian Premier's Award for Australian Studies	Struggletown	Melbourne University Press, 1984
1985	Fellowship of Australian Writers' Local History Award	Struggletown	Melbourne University Press, 1984
1985	Ernest Scott Prize, University of Melbourne	Struggletown	Melbourne University Press, 1984
1992	Max Crawford Medal, Australian Academy of the Humanities	Struggletown	Melbourne University Press, 1984
1993	The Age Book of the Year (joint winner)	Journeyings	Melbourne University Press, 1993
1993	The Age Non-fiction Book of the Year	Journeyings	Melbourne University Press, 1993
1999	NSW Premier's History Awards in Community and Regional History	Sex and Suffering	Melbourne University Press, 1998
1999	Victorian Community and Local History Award, best publication category winner	Sex and Suffering	Melbourne University Press, 1998
2022	Ernest Scott Prize, University of Melbourne (joint winner)	Vandemonians	Melbourne University Publishing, 2021
