= Penny Russell =

Australian historian

- Born: 20 March 1961 (age 65); Maryborough, Queensland
- Awards: New South Wales Premier's Australian History Prize (2011); Fellow of the Australian Academy of the Humanities (2012)

Academic background
- Education: Monash University (BA [Hons]); University of Melbourne (PhD)
- Thesis: A Wish of Distinction: Genteel Femininity in Melbourne Society, 1860–1880 (1990)
- Doctoral advisor: Patricia Grimshaw

Academic work
- Discipline: History
- Institutions: University of Sydney

Penelope Ann Russell, FAHA (born 20 March 1961) is an Australian social historian. She is Bicentennial Professor of Australian History at the University of Sydney.

== Early life and education ==
Penelope Ann Russell was born in 1961 in Maryborough, Queensland, to teacher/librarian Mary Gertrude Russell (née Thompson) and dentist Gerald Victor Russell. As a young child, she moved with her family to Ballarat and attended primary school and then Ballarat East High School, where she sat the Higher School Certificate in 1978. She completed a Bachelor of Arts with Honours at Monash University in 1982 with her thesis "'Mothers of the Race': A Study of the First Thirty Women Medical Graduates from the University of Melbourne". She was awarded a Doctor of Philosophy (PhD) in 1990 by the University of Melbourne and her first book, A Wish of Distinction, published in 1994, was developed from her PhD thesis.

== Career ==
Russell spent two years in the Australian Public Service before beginning her PhD. She lectured at the University of Melbourne, RMIT and Victorian College Rusden before moving to the University of Sydney as an Australian history lecturer in 1990. She was appointed senior lecturer in 1995, associate professor in 2006 and full professor in 2013, shortly afterwards becoming Bicentennial Professor of Australian History. With Richard White, Russell was co-editor of the journal History Australia from 2009 to 2012.

== Awards and recognition ==
Russell was elected Fellow of the Australian Academy of the Humanities (FAHA) in 2012. She won the Australian History Prize at the New South Wales Premier's History Awards for Savage or Civilised? in 2011. She was awarded the 2023 Ross Stelle AM Fellowship by the State Library of New South Wales to explore the Sydney streetscapes by John Rae.

== Selected works ==
=== Books ===
- Russell, Penny (1994). A Wish of Distinction: Colonial gentility and femininity. Melbourne: Melbourne University Press. ISBN 9780522845525.
- Russell, Penny; White, Richard, eds. (1994). Pastiche I: Reflections on nineteenth-century Australia. St Leonards, NSW, Australia: Allen & Unwin. ISBN 1-86373-535-6.
- Russell, Penny; White, Richard, eds. (1997). Memories and Dreams: Reflections on twentieth-century Australia: Pastiche II. St. Leonards, NSW: Allen & Unwin. ISBN 1-86373-536-4.
- Franklin, Jane (2002). Russell, Penny (ed.). This Errant Lady: Jane Franklin's overland journey to Port Philip and Sydney, 1839. Canberra: National Library of Australia. ISBN 0-642-10749-1.
- Deacon, Desley; Russell, Penny & Woollacott, Angela, eds. (2010). Transnational lives : biographies of global modernity, 1700–present. Palgrave Macmillan.
- Russell, Penny (2010). Savage or Civilised? Manners in colonial Australia. Sydney: University of New South Wales Press. ISBN 978-1-74224-546-1.
- Worden, Nigel; Russell, Penny (eds.): Honourable Intentions?: Violence and Virtue in Australian and Cape Colonies, c. 1750 to 1850. (London: Routledge, 2016)

=== Articles ===
- Russell, Penny (1 March 2004). "A woman of the future? feminism and conservatism in colonial New South Wales". Women's History Review. 13 (1): 69–90. doi:10.1080/09612020400200383. ISSN 0961-2025. S2CID 143610230.

== Personal ==
Russell and James Andrew Campbell married in 1987. They have two children.
