= People of the River (book) =

2020 book by Grace Karskens

People of the River: Lost Worlds of Early Australia
- Author: Grace Karskens
- Genre: History
- Publisher: Allen & Unwin
- Publication date: 1 September 2020
- Awards: Australian History Prize, NSW Premier's History Awards, 2021 Australian History Prize, Prime Minister's Literary Awards, 2021 Ernest Scott Prize, 2021 (co-winner)
- ISBN: 9781760292232
- Preceded by: The Colony: A History of Early Sydney

People of the River: Lost Worlds of Early Australia is a 2020 book by Australian historian Grace Karskens.

The book is about people living along Dyarubbin, otherwise known as the Nepean-Hawkesbury River, on the outskirts of the Greater Sydney region. It begins with chapters on the first people before the arrival of the First Fleet in 1788 and continues through early contact with "emancipist farmers" and their clearing of the land for farming.

== Overview ==
People of the River is written in four parts. Deep Country covers the river's origins and earliest inhabitants. Frontiers deals with early contact between white settlers and the indigenous tribes and conflicts that followed. New Old Land looks at the clearing of the land to make way for farming and the flooding of that land. The final part is People of the River, where Karskens examines individuals' lives to demonstrate the relationships that developed between Aboriginal people and the colonists.

== Reception ==
Writing in Australian Book Review, Alan Atkinson said "Karskens has found ways, brilliantly original ways, of taking in entire populations, and she is particularly good with webs of human connection and patterns of movement." Susan Waggoner critiqued the book for Foreword Reviews, saying "People of the River is a meticulous history whose exciting writing reveals the history of the Hawkesbury-Nepean River, the Aboriginal people who settled there, and the English and Irish convicts who arrived and built its farmlands."

Miranda Johnson, an historian at the University of Otago, concluded her review in The Sydney Morning Herald:

The story is richly layered because of the impressive range of disciplinary knowledge that Karskens draws on – from geology, environmental science, archaeology, history, anthropology, linguistics – and because Karskens herself has spent so much time with the river and its people. It is a history that will last because of Karskens’ luminous writing and her ability to counter overgeneralisation with precise and thoughtful analysis of the evidence.

The judges of the 2021 Australian History Prize at the NSW Premier's History Awards wrote:

People of the River stood out from the field for its depth of research and accessibility. Beautifully written, it is a work of rigorous scholarship that seamlessly integrates different historical perspectives and was a pleasure to read.

== Awards ==
- Australian History Prize, NSW Premier's History Awards, 2021
- Australian History Prize, Prime Minister's Literary Awards, 2021
- Ernest Scott Prize, 2021 (co-winner)
