= Stuart Macintyre =

Australian historian (1947–2021)

Stuart Macintyre AO, FAHA, FASSA
- Born: 27 April 1947; Melbourne, Victoria, Australia
- Died: 22 November 2021 (aged 74); Melbourne, Victoria, Australia
- Awards: Premier of Victoria's Literary Award for Australian Studies (1986); Fellow of the Academy of the Social Sciences in Australia (1987); Redmond Barry Award (1997); The Age Non-Fiction Book of the Year Award (1998); Fellow of the Australian Academy of the Humanities (1999); Premier of New South Wales' Australian History Prize (2004); Officer of the Order of Australia (2011); Ernest Scott Prize (2016)

Academic background
- Education: University of Melbourne (BA); Monash University (MA); University of Cambridge (PhD)
- Doctoral advisor: Henry Pelling

Academic work
- Institutions: University of Melbourne
- Notable students: Frank Bongiorno
- Notable works: The History Wars (2003)
- Notable ideas: Australian history Class and labour history

Stuart Forbes Macintyre AO, FAHA, FASSA (21 April 1947 – 22 November 2021) was an Australian historian, and Dean of the Faculty of Arts at the University of Melbourne from 1999 to 2008. He was voted one of Australia's most influential historians.

== Early life and education ==
The son of Forbes Macintyre and Alison Stevens Macintyre, Stuart Macintyre was born in Melbourne on 21 April 1947. His schooling took place at Scotch College and, later, at the University of Melbourne, where he was a resident of Ormond College. While an undergraduate, he specialised in history and obtained his bachelor's degree in 1968. He also held a Master of Arts degree from Monash University (1971) and a PhD from the University of Cambridge (1975), for which he was awarded the Blackwood Prize. In 1976, he married Martha Bruton , a social anthropologist.

While a postgraduate student at Monash in the early 1970s, Macintyre joined the Left Tendency faction of the Communist Party of Australia (CPA), which was particularly strong at the campus. His CPA membership lapsed while he was studying in the United Kingdom and, on returning to Australia, he joined the Australian Labor Party. He thereafter considered himself to be a democratic socialist. As a historian, he identified with the tradition of labour historians such as Henry Pelling, who was his doctoral supervisor in Britain.

== Academic career ==
Macintyre had a long academic career both within Australia and internationally. From 1977 to 1978, Macintyre was a research fellow at St John's College at the University of Cambridge. He returned to Australia in 1979 as a lecturer at Murdoch University in Perth, and the following year returned to Melbourne, where he lectured at the University of Melbourne until 1981. For a brief subsequent period – 1982–83 – he was a research fellow at the Australian National University in Canberra, and in 1984 he was promoted to senior lecturer at the University of Melbourne.

Beginning in 1988, Macintyre served as a reader in history at the University of Melbourne. Three years later he became professor, and was given the Ernest Scott chair in history. He was appointed dean of the Faculty of Arts in 1999. In 2002 he was made a laureate professor of the University of Melbourne. Macintyre was also a visiting scholar or fellow at Griffith University (1986), the University of Canterbury, New Zealand (1988), the University of Western Australia (1988), the Australian National University (1991) and the University of Otago, New Zealand (1992).

From 1987 to 1996, Macintyre was a member of the council of the National Library of Australia (NLA) and from 1989 to 1998, a member of the council of the State Library of Victoria (SLV). He also served as chairperson of the Humanities and Creative Arts Panel of the Australian Research Council (ARC) in 2003. In 2005, Macintyre was outspoken about the actions of the then federal Education Minister Brendan Nelson, who personally vetoed several ARC grants which had already been approved by the ARC's peer review process.

Macintyre finished a second term as the dean of arts in mid-2006. For the 2007–08 academic year he held the Harvard Chair of Australian Studies, retaining his academic appointment at Melbourne. He served as president of the Academy of the Social Sciences in Australia and the Australian Society for the Study of Labour History. He was also a fellow of the Australian Academy of the Humanities.

== Publications ==
As an historian Macintyre was prolific. He published numerous books, including a history of Marxism in the United Kingdom in the early 20th century, based on his doctoral thesis, a history of the labour movement in Australia, and Reds, the first volume of the history of the Communist Party of Australia; the second volume, The Party, was published posthumously in 2022.

Perhaps his most widely known work is The History Wars (with Anna Clark), a study of the history wars, a public debate about the recent interpretation of various aspects of the history of Australia. The book was launched by former Prime Minister of Australia Paul Keating, who took the opportunity to criticise conservative views of Australian history, and those who hold them (such as the then current Prime Minister John Howard), saying that they suffered from "a failure of imagination", and said that The History Wars "rolls out the canvas of this debate".

Macintyre's critics, such as Gregory Melleuish (history lecturer at the University of Wollongong), responded to the book by declaring that Macintyre was a partisan history warrior himself, and that "its primary arguments are derived from the pro-Communist polemics of the Cold War". Keith Windschuttle said that Macintyre attempted to "caricature the history debate" but failed to explain what he meant. Windschuttle has also accused Macintyre of harbouring "a deep distaste" for Australia's British heritage and has criticised Macintyre's involvement in the academic attack against Geoffrey Blainey during the so-called "Blainey affair".

In a foreword to The History Wars, former Chief Justice of Australia, Sir Anthony Mason, said that the book was "a fascinating study of the recent endeavours to rewrite or reinterpret the history of European settlement in Australia."

== Awards ==
Macintyre received many awards, including the Victorian Premier's Literary Award for Australian Studies in 1986, for his work in authoring the fourth volume of the Oxford History of Australia, and the Redmond Barry Award from the Australian Library and Information Association in 1997, in recognition of his work with the NLA and SLV. His book The Reds won The Age Non-Fiction Book of the Year Award in 1998. The History Wars won the 2004 Premier of New South Wales' Australian History Prize. Australia's Boldest Experiment won the Ernest Scott Prize in 2016 and the 2016 NSW Premier's Australian History Prize.

On 26 January 2011, Macintyre was named an Officer of the Order of Australia.

== Bibliography ==
- — (1980). A Proletarian Science: Marxism in Britain, 1917–1933. Cambridge University Press. ISBN 0-521-22621-X.
- — (1980). Little Moscows. Communism and working-class Militancy in Inter-war Britain publisher. Croom Helm. ISBN 0-7099-0083-X
- — (1985). Winners and Losers. the Pursuit of Social Justice in Australian History. Allen & Unwin. ISBN 0-86861 470 X.
- — (1986). The Oxford History of Australia, Volume 4, 1901–1942: The Succeeding Age. Oxford University Press. ISBN 0-19-553518-9.
- — (1989). The Labour Experiment. McPhee Gribble. ISBN 0-86914-057-4.
- — (1991). A Colonial Liberalism: The lost world of three Victorian visionaries. Oxford University Press. ISBN 0-86914-057-4.
- — (1994). A History for a Nation: Ernest Scott and the Making of Australian History. Melbourne University Press. ISBN 0-522-84568-1.
- — (1999). The Reds: The Communist Party of Australia from Origins to Illegality. Allen & Unwin. ISBN 0195547608.
- —; Clark, Anna (2003). The History Wars. Melbourne University Publishing. ISBN 0-522-85091-X.
- —; Fitzpatrick, Sheila (2007). Against the grain: Brian Fitzpatrick and Manning Clark in Australian history and politics. Melbourne University Publishing. ISBN 9780522854237.
- — (2010). The Poor Relation. Melbourne University Press. ISBN 978-0-522-85775-7
- Waghorne, James; Macintyre, Stuart (2011). Liberty: A history of civil liberties in Australia. UNSW Press. ISBN 9780522869736.
- — (2015). Australia's Boldest Experiment: War and Reconstruction in the 1940s. NewSouth Publishing. ISBN 9781742231129.
- — (2016). A Concise History of Australia (4th ed.). Cambridge University Press. ISBN 9781107562431.
- Brett, André; Croucher, Gwilym; Macintyre, Stuart (2016). Life After Dawkins: The University of Melbourne in the Unified National System of higher education. Melbourne University Publishing. ISBN 9780522869736.
- —; Croucher, Gwilym; Brett, André (2017). No End of a Lesson : Australia's unified national system of higher education. Melbourne University Publishing. ISBN 9780522871906.
- — (2022). The Party: The Communist Party of Australia from Heyday to Reckoning. Allen & Unwin. ISBN 9781760875183.
- Graeme Davison; John Hirst; Stuart Macintyre, eds. (2001). The Oxford Companion to Australian History. Melbourne: Oxford University Press. ISBN 019551503X.
