= Kit McNaughton =

Australian nurse

Catherine Ryan
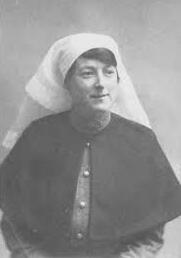
- Kit McNaughton in 1916
- Born: Catherine McNaughton; March 1884; Geelong, Victoria
- Died: 14 February 1953 (aged 68); Werribee, Victoria
- Military career
- Allegiance: Australia
- Branch: Australian Imperial Force
- Service years: 1915–1919
- Rank: Sister
- Nickname: Kit
- Unit: Australian Army Nursing Service
- Conflicts: First World War
- Awards: Royal Red Cross; Mentioned in dispatches

Catherine "Kit" Ryan, RRC (née McNaughton; March 1884 – 14 February 1953) was a decorated Australian nurse who served in the First World War. She kept a detailed diary of her experiences, the basis of which was later published by Janet Butler as Kitty's War (2013).

== Military service ==
McNaughton was mentioned in dispatches in 1917, and awarded the Royal Red Cross in 1919.

== In popular culture ==
McNaughton's diaries were the subject of the 2013 book Kitty's War, written by historian Janet Butler. The book won the New South Wales Premier's Australian History Prize in 2013 and the WK Hancock Prize by the Australian Historical Association in 2014.

McNaughton was one of the six Australians whose war experiences were presented in The War That Changed Us, a four-part television documentary series about Australia's involvement in the First World War. Her war experiences also formed the basis of the characters in the ANZAC Girls television series.
