= Jill Roe =

Australian historian and academic (1940–2017)

- Born: Jillian Isobel Roe; 10 November 1940; Tumby Bay, South Australia
- Died: 12 January 2017 (aged 76); Pearl Beach, New South Wales
- Awards: Fellow of the Academy of the Social Sciences in Australia (1991); Officer of the Order of Australia (2007); Queensland Premier's History Book Award (2009); Magarey Medal for biography (2010); Adelaide Festival Awards for Literature – Non-Fiction Award (2010)

Academic background
- Education: University of Adelaide (BA); Australian National University (MA)

Academic work
- Discipline: History
- Sub-discipline: Modern history, biography
- Institutions: Macquarie University
- Notable works: Stella Miles Franklin: A Biography (2008)

Jillian Isobel Roe, AO, FASSA (10 November 1940 – 12 January 2017) was an Australian historian and academic, who wrote a definitive biography of the Australian writer Miles Franklin.

== Early life and education ==
Roe was born in 1940, at Tumby Bay, South Australia. Her grandparents had been early settlers of the western coast of South Australia. Her mother Edna Heath, a nurse, died before Roe was two years old, and she was raised on the Eyre Peninsula by her father John Roe, a farmer. At the age of 14, she attended Adelaide Girls' High School. Upon matriculating, she enrolled to study history at the University of Adelaide, and in 1963 moved on to the Australian National University in Canberra, where she wrote her Master of Arts thesis on "intellectual life of the city of Melbourne between 1876 and 1886", under the supervision of Don Baker and Manning Clark.

== Career ==
In 1967, Roe joined the newly founded Macquarie University as a lecturer in history. She remained at the university for 36 years, becoming a Professor Emerita upon her retirement in 2003.

In 1984, she joined the board of the Australian Dictionary of Biography, serving as the board's president from 1996 to 2006. She also wrote 19 entries for the ADB, and was editor of its 2005 supplement.

In December 1982, publisher Richard Walsh of Angus & Robertson commissioned Roe to write a biography of Miles Franklin. Roe delivered the manuscript for Stella Miles Franklin: A Biography 26 years later in 2008, and it was published by HarperCollins (which had taken over Angus & Robertson). Roe acknowledged the book has "been a long time coming". A follow-up edition titled Her Brilliant Career: The Life of Stella Miles Franklin was published in 2009. Roe had previously written Franklin's entry in the Australian Dictionary of Biography, and edited My Congenials: Miles Franklin and friends in letters, a compilation of Franklin's correspondence, which was published in 1993.

In 2016, Roe published her memoir, Our Fathers Cleared the Bush, about her childhood on the Eyre Peninsula.

Roe died after a long illness on 12 January 2017, at her home in Pearl Beach on the New South Wales Central Coast.

== Awards and honours ==
Roe was appointed an Officer of the Order of Australia (AO) in the 2007 Queen's Birthday Honours.

She was elected a Fellow of the Academy of the Social Sciences in Australia (FASSA) in 1991 and the Federation of Australian Historical Societies (FFAHS).

In 2013, Macquarie University conferred upon her the Higher Degree of Doctor of Letters.

Roe's contribution to Australian history was recognised by the inauguration in 2014 of the annual Jill Roe Prize.

== Selected works ==
- Roe, Jill, Marvellous Melbourne: the emergence of an Australian City (1974), Sydney, Hicks Smith & Sons, ISBN 0454019807.
- Roe, Jill, Beyond Belief: Theosophy in Australia 1879–1939 (1986), Sydney, New South Wales University Press, ISBN 0868400424
- Roe, Jill (ed.) My Congenials: Miles Franklin and Friends in Letters: 1879–1938 Vol 1 (1993), Melbourne, HarperCollins, ISBN 9780207169250.
- Roe, Jill and Bettison, Margaret, A Gregarious Culture: Topical Writings of Miles Franklin: collected and introduced, with annotations, (2001), St Lucia, Queensland, University of Queensland Press, ISBN 0702232378.
- Roe, Jill, Stella Miles Franklin: A Biography (2008), Sydney, Fourth Estate, ISBN 9780732275785.
- Roe, Jill (ed.) My Congenials: Miles Franklin and Friends in Letters, 2 ed. (2010). Sydney, Angus & Robertson, ISBN 9780732280932.
- Roe, Jill, Miles Franklin: A Short Biography (2018), Australia, HarperCollins, ISBN 9781460755792.
