= Warwick Anderson =

Australian physician, poet and historian

- Born: 10 December 1958 (age 67); Melbourne, Victoria
- Awards: W. K. Hancock Award (2004); Guggenheim Fellowship (2007); Best in the Social Sciences, Philippine National Book Awards (2008); New South Wales Premier's General History Prize (2009); Australian Laureate Fellowship (2011); Fellow of the Australian Academy of the Humanities (2012); Fellow of the Academy of the Social Sciences in Australia (2013); Fellow of the Australian Academy of Health and Medical Sciences (2015); RSNSW History and Philosophy of Science Medal (2015); John Desmond Bernal Prize (2023)

Academic background
- Education: University of Melbourne (BMedSc, MBBS, MD); University of Pennsylvania (MA, PhD)

Academic work
- Discipline: History/Anthropology
- Sub-discipline: History of Science and Medicine
- Institutions: University of Sydney (2007–); University of Wisconsin-Madison (2003–09); University of California, Berkeley (2002–03); University of California, San Francisco (2000–03); University of Melbourne (1995–2000); Harvard University (1992–95)

Warwick Hugh Anderson (born 10 December 1958), medical doctor, poet, and historian, is Janet Dora Hine Professor of Politics, Governance and Ethics in the Discipline of Anthropology, School of Social and Political Sciences, and in the Charles Perkins Centre, University of Sydney, where he was previously an Australian Research Council Laureate Fellow (2012–17). He is also honorary professor in the School of Population and Global Health, University of Melbourne. He is a fellow of the Australian Academy of the Humanities, the Academy of Social Sciences in Australia, the Australian Academy of Health and Medical Sciences and the Royal Society of New South Wales, from which he received the History and Philosophy of Science Medal in 2015. For the 2018–19 academic year, Anderson was the Gough Whitlam and Malcolm Fraser Chair of Australian Studies at Harvard University, based in the History of Science Department.

As a historian of science and medicine, Anderson focuses on the biomedical dimensions of racial thought, especially in colonial settings; the globalisation of medicine and science; theories of immunity and self; disease ecology and planetary health; and Covid-19. He has introduced anthropological insights and themes to the history of medicine and science; developed innovative frameworks for the analysis of science and globalisation; and conducted historical research into the material cultures of scientific exchange. His influential formulation of the postcolonial studies of science and medicine has generated a new style of inquiry within science and technology studies.

In 2023, he was awarded the John Desmond Bernal Prize of the Society for Social Studies of Science, for lifetime achievement in Science and Technology Studies.

== Early life and education ==
Anderson was born and educated in Melbourne, Australia, where he attended the University High School. His father, Hugh McDonald Anderson (1927–2017), was a leading folklorist and historian of Australian popular and literary culture, with more than forty books to his credit; his mother, Dawn Anderson, has written books on drama education and creativity.

Anderson graduated from the University of Melbourne Medical School with a Bachelor of Medicine, Bachelor of Surgery in 1983. During the medical course he conducted neurophysiology research, supervised by Ian Darian-Smith, which earned him a Bachelor of Medical Sciences (1980). He was an intern at the Royal Melbourne Hospital, and had paediatric training at the Royal Children's Hospital, Melbourne, and the John Radcliffe Hospital, Oxford. In the 1986 season he was the assistant doctor for the Footscray Football Club (now the AFL Bulldogs). From 1987, he worked in general practice in the inner west of Melbourne, which he continued intermittently until 1999.

Anderson ("Dr. Androgen") was a co-presenter on the award-winning radio program "Spoonful of Medicine" (3RRR) from 1987–88.

== Poetry ==
As a medical student, Anderson began writing and publishing poetry. More than forty poems have appeared in a range of leading journals in Australia and the US. His poetry collection, Hard Cases, Brief Lives (Adelaide: Ginninderra, 2011) was short-listed in 2012 for the Mary Gilmore Award of the Association for the Study of Australian Literature (ASAL).

== History of medicine and science ==
Anderson completed a Doctor of Philosophy in the Department of the History and Sociology of Science at the University of Pennsylvania in 1992. His dissertation was on US colonial medicine and public health in the Philippines, and his advisor was Charles E. Rosenberg. Before moving to Sydney, Anderson held appointments at Harvard University (1992–95); the University of Melbourne (1995–2000); University of California, San Francisco and University of California, Berkeley (2000–2003); and the University of Wisconsin-Madison (2003–07). At Melbourne, he founded the Centre for Health and Society (1997), and helped to establish the Onemda VicHealth Koori Health Unit (1998). At Madison, he was chair of the Department of Medical History and Bioethics and served on the executive committees of the History of Science Department, the Holtz Center for Science and Technology Studies, and the Center for Southeast Asian Studies.

Anderson was the founding editor of Health and History (1998), and served as associate editor for the East Asian STS Journal and Postcolonial Studies. He served on the councils of the American Association of the History of Medicine (AAHM), the Australian and New Zealand Society for the History of Medicine, the Australian Society of Health, Law and Ethics, History of Medicine in Southeast Asia (HOMSEA), the Institute of Postcolonial Studies (Melbourne), and the Pacific Circle, of which he was president 2017–20.

Anderson was awarded a fellowship from the John Simon Guggenheim Foundation (2007–08), and he was a Frederick Burkhardt Fellow of the American Council of Learned Societies (2005–06), which he held at the Institute for Advanced Study, Princeton. In 2013 he was a Whitney J. Oates Fellow at the Humanities Council, Princeton University and a John Hope Franklin Fellow at Duke University.

Among Anderson's key publications are:

- The Cultivation of Whiteness: Science, Health, and Racial Destiny in Australia (MUP 2002 & 2005, Basic 2003, Duke 2006). Awarded the W.K. Hancock Prize of the Australian Historical Association (2004) and the Basic Books Prize in the History of Science, Medicine, and Technology (2001). The research for this book was recognised in the award of the M.D. degree (by thesis) from the University of Melbourne (2002).
- Colonial Pathologies: American Tropical Medicine, Race, and Hygiene in the Philippines (Duke 2006 & 2008, Ateneo de Manila 2007). Awarded the Social Science Prize (2008) of the Philippines National Book Awards.
- The Collectors of Lost Souls: Turning Kuru Scientists into Whitemen (Johns Hopkins 2008 & 2019). Awarded the NSW Premier’s General History Prize (2009), William H. Welch Medal of the AAHM (2010) and the Ludwik Fleck Award of the Society for Social Studies of Science (2010).
- Intolerant Bodies: A Short History of Autoimmunity, with Ian R. Mackay (Johns Hopkins 2014). Awarded the NSW Premier's General History Prize (2015).
- Spectacles of Waste (Polity, 2024)
- Unconscious Dominions: Psychoanalysis, Colonial Trauma, and Global Sovereignties (Duke 2011), edited with Deborah Jenson and Richard C. Keller.
- Pacific Futures: Past and Present (University of Hawai'i Press, 2018), edited with Miranda Johnson and Barbara Brookes
- Luso-Tropicalism and its Discontents: The Making and Unmaking of Racial Exceptionalism (Berghahn, 2019), edited with Ricardo Rocque and Ricardo Venture Santos
- Imagined Racial Laboratories: Colonial and National Racialisations in Southeast Asia (Brill, 2023)

Additionally he is the author of more than 100 articles and book chapters.

== Postcolonial studies of science and medicine ==
Anderson has published a number of manifestos for postcolonial approaches to explaining the globalisation of science and medicine, including:

- Where is the postcolonial history of medicine? Bulletin of the History of Medicine. 1998; 72: 522–30
- Postcolonial technoscience. Social Studies of Science. 2002; 32: 643–58
- Postcolonial histories of medicine. In: Medical History: The Stories and Their Meanings, 285–307. Ed. John Harley Warner and Frank Huisman. Baltimore: Johns Hopkins University Press; 2004
- (With Vincanne Adams) Pramoedya’s chickens: postcolonial studies of technoscience. In: The Handbook of Science and Technology Studies, 3rd ed., 181–204. Ed. Edward J. Hackett, Olga Amsterdamska, Michael Lynch, and Judy Wajcman. Cambridge MA: MIT Press; 2007
- From subjugated knowledge to conjugated subjects: science and globalisation, or postcolonial studies of science? Postcolonial Studies. 2009; 12: 389–400
- Asia as method in science and technology studies. East Asian Science, Technology and Society Journal. 2012; 6: 445–51
- Postcolonial Specters of STS, East Asian Science, Technology and Society 11, no. 2 (2017): 229-223.
- Remembering the spread of Western science. Historical Records of Australian Science 29, no. 2 (2018): 73-81.
- Finding Decolonial Metaphors In Postcolonial Histories. History and Theory. 2020; 59(3): 430-438.
- Islands and Beaches in Science and Technology Studies. Science, Technology and Human Values. 2024.

== Race and ethnicity in the global south ==
In 2011, the Australian Research Council (ARC) awarded Anderson a Laureate Fellowship, making him the first historian to receive this award and the only applicant from the humanities to receive a fellowship in that round. The fellowship supported comparative, transnational research in the history of ideas of race and human difference in the Global South. These studies involved collaborators from Brazil, New Zealand, and South Africa, and over the course of the fellowship supported six post-doctoral fellows.

== Disease ecology and planetary health ==
With the support of an Australian Research Council Discovery Project grant, Anderson has worked on the conceptual development and ethics of planetary health and the health aspects of climate change, extending his earlier studies of disease ecology. His articles on the subject include:

- James H. Dunk, David S. Jones, Anthony Capon, and Warwick H. Anderson, Human Health on an Ailing Planet — Historical Perspectives on Our Future, New England Journal of Medicine 381, no. 8 (2019):778–82.
- Warwick Anderson & James Dunk, Planetary Health Histories: Toward New Ecologies of Epidemiology? Isis. 2022; 113(4): 767–788.
- Warwick Anderson, Toward Planetary Health Ethics? Refiguring Bios. Journal of Bioethical Inquiry. 2023; 20(4): 695-702.
