= Max Crawford =

Australian historian (1906–1991)

Raymond Maxwell Crawford OBE FAHA (6 August 1906–24 November 1991), was a leading Australian historian. He was Professor of History at the University of Melbourne from 1937 to 1970.

== Life and career ==
Crawford was born on 6 August 1906 in Grenfell, New South Wales. He was the ninth of twelve children born to Harriet Isobel (née Wood) and Henry Crawford. His brother Sir John Crawford became a distinguished economist, while his uncles included Queensland state MP James Crawford and New South Wales state MP Thomas Crawford.

Crawford's father was a stationmaster with New South Wales Government Railways. Max Crawford was educated at Sydney Boys High School, the University of Sydney and Balliol College, Oxford, where he studied English, history, philosophy and fine art (he was an accomplished painter and poet). In 1935 he returned to Australia to take up a lectureship in history at Sydney, and in 1937 he succeeded Sir Ernest Scott as Professor of History at Melbourne.

Although Crawford's main area of professional interest was the Renaissance, he recognised that as one of the few Australian historians employed in Australian universities at that time, he had a duty to promote the study of Australian history, which had generally been regarded as unworthy of serious study by most Australian university academics before his time. In 1952 he published Australia, a one-volume general history of Australia which became a standard work for some years. He was one of the founders of the journal Historical Studies (the first academic journal devoted to Australian history), of the Australian Institute of Aboriginal Studies, the Australian Humanities Research Council and the Australian Academy of the Humanities.

During Crawford's tenure the Melbourne University History Department developed into what became known as the "Melbourne school" of Australian history. The tenets of Crawford's school were meticulous attention to research and scholarship, combined with a broadly liberal and progressive outlook, underpinned by the belief that Australian history was worthy of serious academic effort.

Crawford described himself as a political liberal, but he was willing to lend his support to left-wing causes. Like many of his generation he was greatly influenced by the Spanish Civil War of 1936–39. He was vice-president of the Australian Council for Civil Liberties from 1938 to 1945, and was on the executive of the Australia-Soviet Friendship League. During World War II he served on the staff of the Australian Embassy in the Soviet Union. During the Cold War period of the early 1950s he was attacked as a "fellow traveller" and a "pink professor," charges which he generally ignored.

After World War II Australian universities expanded greatly and became more bureaucratic in their operations. Crawford oversaw the rapid expansion of the History Department, but retained his personal control, and appointed all its staff personally until 1958. Among the staff Crawford employed and encouraged were Manning Clark, Geoffrey Blainey, Greg Dening, John La Nauze, John Poynter, Margaret Kiddle and Kathleen Fitzpatrick - several of these also studied under Crawford.

Crawford was awarded an OBE in 1971 and was awarded an honorary doctorate of letters by the University of Melbourne in 1988. He devoted his retirement to painting and poetry, and died in Melbourne in 1991. Stuart MacIntyre wrote on his death: "He elevated the contribution of history by his imaginative leadership in stimulating his staff and students to rewrite the past, and to assist positively in reshaping Australian national life and culture."

== Bibliography ==
Crawford's publications include The Study of History: A Synoptic View (1939), Ourselves and the Pacific (1941), The Renaissance and Other Essays (1945), Australia (1952), An Australian Perspective (1960) and A Bit of a Rebel (1971). In 2005 Fay Anderson published a biography, An Historian's Life: Max Crawford and the Politics of Academic Freedom (Melbourne University Press).

== Legacy ==
The Max Crawford Medal is awarded biennially.
