= Ian Hoskins =

Australian historian and author

- Born: 1962
- Alma mater: University of Sydney
- Occupation: Historian
- Employer: North Sydney Council

Ian Rowland Hoskins (born in 1962) is an Australian historian and author based in Sydney. His books are known for their thematic surveying of social, cultural and geographical history.

== Career ==
Hoskins studied at the University of Sydney and taught American History there as an academic from 1989 to 1993, alongside fellow historians Neville Meaney and Shane White. In 1996, Hoskins was awarded his PhD titled Cultivating the Citizen: Cultural Politics in the Parks and Gardens of Sydney, 1880-1930.

In 2010, Hoskins won the Queensland Premier's Literary Prize for History with his first book Sydney Harbour: A History, which went on to be republished in 2022. His second book, Coast was the first history to be written on the New South Wales coast, receiving the New South Wales Premier’s Literary Prize for Community and Regional History in 2014. Published in 2020, Hoskins' third book Rivers: The Lifeblood of Australia included a foreword by Don Watson and was long-listed for the 2021 Indie Book Awards.

In the lead up to his latest work Australia & the Pacific: A History, Ian Hoskins became the State Library of NSW's 2019 CH Currey Fellow and studied their Pacific collections. His Pacific book was shortlisted for the 2022 New South Wales Premier’s History Awards and won the Frank Broeze Memorial Maritime History Book Prize in 2023. It was described by Ross Fitzgerald as a "captivating general history of Australia viewed in a Pacific context" and used the latest findings from archaeology, anthropology, history, and politics to explore Australia's relationship with its surrounding regions.

He has worked as the local historian for North Sydney Council since 2003. While chronicling North Sydney's history, Hoskins published "Was thinking of Home Today": North Sydney and the Great War which was shortlisted for the New South Wales Premier's History Awards for Local and Regional History in 2008. Also aligned with his role on North Sydney Council, Ian Hoskins' website won the National Trust Heritage Award for multimedia in 2015.

== Early life ==
Hoskins was born in Singapore to British parents, migrating to Sydney on Blue Star Line's MV Australasia in 1966.
