= Kay Daniels =

Australian historian and public servant

Verna Kay Daniels, known as Kay Daniels (17 June 1941 – 17 July 2001) was a historian and a public servant, who made a significant contribution to knowledge on women in Australia, as well as Australian social and colonial history. She was an author and a co-author of books about women in Australian history as well as a high school teacher and university lecturer.

The Kay Daniels Award, sponsored by members and associates of the Australian Historical Association, the Port Arthur Historic Site Management Authority and the University of Tasmania is an award recognizing outstanding original research.

== Early life ==
Daniels was born in Adelaide, the first child born to a tramway worker called Norman, and a dressmaker called Jean.

== Education ==
Growing up Daniels attended state schools. She graduated as school dux at St. Morris Primary school and then went to Norwood High School. She then continued her studies at the University of Adelaide and graduated in 1963. A couple of years later, after winning a travelling scholarship, she studied at the University of Sussex where she published her first piece of work.

== Career ==
After finishing her degree at the University of Adelaide she briefly taught at Clare High School. When she returned to Australia she started work at the University of Tasmania where she was appointed Senior lecturer in the history department and worked there from 1967 to 1988. With funded money from the International Women's year Project, she was able to design and supervise a project that she co-edited with Mary Murnane and Anne Picot. They used the Australian archives articles relating to women. In 1977 they published; Women In Australia: an annotated guide to records. She co-authored, Uphill all the Way, a documentary history of Women in Australia, which was published in 1979. In 1984 she published So much Hard Work: women and prostitution in Australian History and in 1998, Convict Women, which was a study of the life and experiences of convict women in Tasmania.

== Later life ==
It was in 2001 Daniels was diagnosed with pancreatic cancer, and around 5 weeks later on 17 July, she died at the Clare Holland House, in Canberra.

== Awards ==
While studying at the University of Adelaide she won the university's Annie Montgomery Martin medal and prize for modern history in 1957. She was also awarded the university's George Murray travelling scholarship
