= Geoffrey Serle =

Australian historian

Geoffrey Serle AO
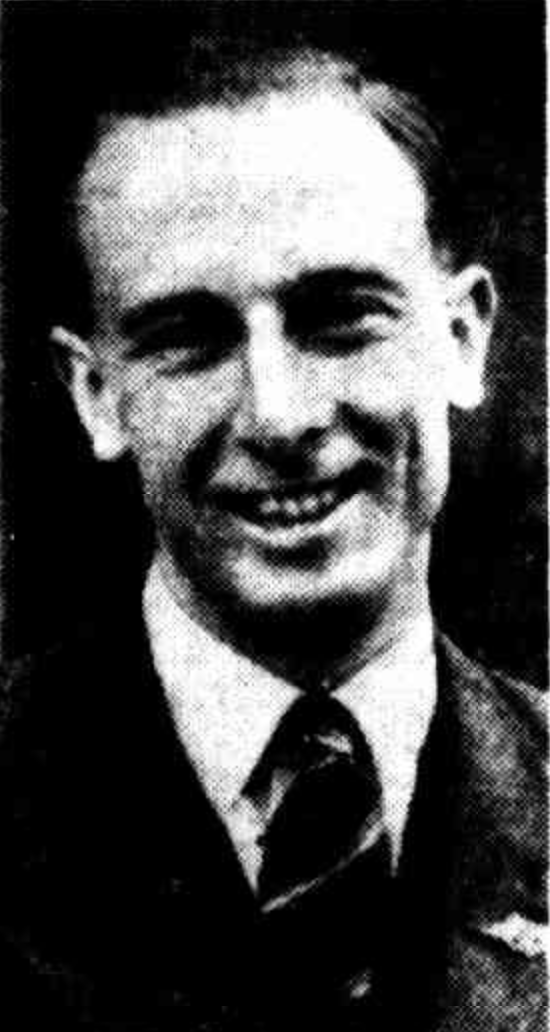
- Serle in 1946
- Born: 10 March 1922; Hawthorn, Victoria
- Died: 27 April 1998 (aged 76); Richmond, Victoria
- Relatives: Percival Serle (father); Dora Serle (mother}
- Awards: Rhodes Scholarship (1947); Fellow of the Australian Academy of the Humanities (1970); Colin Roderick Award (1971, 1982); Fellow of the Academy of the Social Sciences in Australia (1973); The Age Non-fiction Award (1982); Officer of the Order of Australia (1986)

Academic background
- Education: University of Melbourne (BA [Hons]); University of Oxford (DPhil)
- Influences: Percival Serle; Kathleen Fitzpatrick; Max Crawford; Manning Clark

Academic work
- Institutions: Monash University; University of Melbourne
- Main interests: Australian history Biography; Colonial Victoria
- Notable works: The Golden Age (1963); The Rush to be Rich (1971); John Monash (1982)

Alan Geoffrey Serle AO, FAHA, FASSA (10 March 1922 – 27 April 1998), known as Geoff, was an Australian historian, who is best known for his books on the colony of Victoria; The Golden Age (1963) and The Rush to be Rich (1971) and his biographies of John Monash, John Curtin and Robin Boyd.

== Early life ==
Serle was born on 10 March 1922, in the Melbourne suburb of Hawthorn, the son of Percival Serle and Dora, née Hake. He attended Scotch College and briefly read history at the University of Melbourne where he was a resident at Ormond College before joining the Second Australian Imperial Force in 1941. He was seriously wounded in action at Finschhafen, New Guinea. He was discharged in 1944, and resumed study at the University of Melbourne, also being active in the University Labour Club. In 1946, he completed a Bachelor of Arts (Honours) degree and won a Rhodes Scholarship. This enabled him to enter University College, Oxford, where he graduated with a doctorate in 1950.

== Academic career ==
From 1950 Serle taught Australian History at the University of Melbourne, and after 1961 was Reader in History at the newly established Monash University. His first book appeared in 1957; The Melbourne Scene was a selection of documents relating to Victoria and was edited with James Grant.

Serle was active in the establishment of the Victorian branch of the Australian Fabian Society and in establishing the Friends of the La Trobe Library in 1966. He was also closely associated with Meanjin and Overland magazines. Serle also edited Volumes 7–11 of the Australian Dictionary of Biography (Volumes 7–10 with Bede Nairn).

John Ritchie's entry in the Australian Dictionary of Biography makes pointed reference to Serle's passion for Australia. When Ritchie sent him a letter from London in 1972 "extolling the virtues of England, [Serle] sent a postcard in reply: on one side it had a painting by Tom Roberts, on the other he wrote, aut Australia, aut nihil."

Serle was appointed an Officer of the Order of Australia in 1986.

== Personal life ==
On 12 January 1955 Serle married Jessie Macdonald, an art historian, with whom he had four children: Oenone, Donald, Jamie and Richard.

Serle's background was "middle-class, Protestant and Melburnian". Serle was known in his youth for his sporting prowess and in his middle age for being an "enthusiastic spectator". In John Ritchie's obituary, Serle is described as "incisive and insightful, pragmatic and down-to-earth, left-leaning in his political sympathies without being dogmatic, he was gentle in nature, thoughtful in temperament, egalitarian in outlook, exceptionally hard-working, and a loyal friend. He enjoyed a can of beer, a glass of wine, a cigarette and his pipe. In private life, he succeeded in the three things that matter most, as a son, a husband and a father."

== Published works ==
- —; James Grant (1957). The Melbourne Scene 1803–1956. Melbourne: Melbourne University Press.
- — (1963). The Golden Age: A History of the Colony of Victoria 1851–1861. Melbourne: Melbourne University Press.
- — (1971). The Rush to be Rich. Melbourne: Melbourne University Press. ISBN 9780522840094.
- —; Kathleen Thomson (1972). A Biographical Register of the Victorian Parliament. Canberra: Australian National University Press. ISBN 9780708107393.
- — (1973). From Deserts the Prophets Come: The Creative Spirit in Australia 1788–1972. Melbourne: Heinemann. ISBN 9780855610296.
- — (1982). John Monash: A Biography. Melbourne: Melbourne University Press. ISBN 9780522842395.
- — (1987). The Creative Spirit in Australia: A Cultural History. Melbourne: Heinemann. ISBN 9780855611040.
- — (1988). Percival Serle 1871–1951, Biographer, Bibliographer, Anthologist and Art Curator: A Memoir. Canberra: Officina Brindabella. ISBN 9780909422165.
- — (1993). Sir John Medley: A Memoir. Melbourne: Melbourne University Press. ISBN 9780522845402.
- — (1995). Robin Boyd: A Life. Melbourne: Melbourne University Press. ISBN 9780522846690.
- — (1998). For Australia and Labor: Prime Minister John Curtin. Perth: John Curtin Prime Ministerial Library. ISBN 9781863426558.
- — (1999). Colin Gilray. Melbourne: History Department, University of Melbourne.
