= Pat Jalland =

Australian historian

Pat Jalland FASSA
- Born: Patricia Case; 18 August 1941 (age 85); Manchester, England
- Occupation: Historian

Academic background
- Education: University of Bristol (BA, 1963); King's College London (1964); University of Toronto (MA, 1969, PhD, 1976)
- Alma mater: University of Toronto
- Thesis: The Irish question in liberal politics, 1911–14 (1976)

Academic work
- Institutions: Curtin University (1976–1983); Murdoch University (1986–1996); Australian National University (1983–1985, 1991–1992, 1997–)

Pat Jalland FASSA (born 1941) is an Australian historian. She is emeritus professor of history in the Research School of Social Sciences at the Australian National University.

== Early life and education ==
Patricia Case was born in Manchester, England on 18 August 1941. She graduated from the University of Bristol with a BA in 1963. She studied for her teaching qualification at King's College, London in 1964. She completed a MA (1969) and PhD (1976) at the University of Toronto.

== Career ==
After award of her PhD, Jalland worked at Curtin University (1976–1983) and Murdoch University (1986–1996). She joined the Research School of Social Sciences at the Australian National University in 1996, where she remained until retirement in 2013. Following her retirement, she was appointed emeritus professor in 2013.

Jalland was elected a Fellow of the Royal Historical Society in 1981 and Fellow of the Academy of the Social Sciences in Australia in 1998.

== Selected works ==
- Jalland, Patricia (1980). The Liberals and Ireland: The Ulster question in British politics to 1914. Harvester Press. ISBN 978-0-85527-627-0.
- Jalland, Pat (1986). Women, marriage, and politics, 1860–1914. Oxford University Press. ISBN 978-0-19-282087-7.
- Jalland, Pat; Hooper, John, eds. (1986). Women from birth to death : the female life cycle in Britain 1830-1914. Harvester Press Limited. ISBN 978-0-7108-0984-1.
- Jalland, Pat (1996). Death in the Victorian family. Oxford University Press. ISBN 978-0-19-820188-5.
- Jalland, Pat (2002). Australian ways of death: A social and cultural history, 1840–1918. Oxford University Press. ISBN 978-0-19-550754-6.
- Jalland, Pat (2005). Changing ways of death in twentieth-century Australia: War, medicine and the funeral business. University of New South Wales Press. ISBN 978-0-86840-905-4.
- Jalland, Pat (2010). Death in war and peace: Loss and grief in England, 1914–1970. Oxford University Press. ISBN 978-0-19-926551-0.
- Jalland, Pat (2015). Old age in Australia: A history. Melbourne University Press. ISBN 978-0-522-86707-7.
