= New South Wales Premier's History Awards =

The New South Wales Premier's History Awards, also known as the NSW History Awards, honour distinguished achievement in the interpretation of history, through both the written word and non-print media by Australian citizens and permanent residents of Australia.

== History ==
The State Government of New South Wales, Australia established the Premier's History Awards in 1997, which were devised by members of the History Council of NSW including Max Kelly, Paul Ashton and Shirley Fitzgerald. In 2005 the name of the awards was changed to the NSW Premier's History Awards. The awards are presented annually in early September and are managed by the State Library of New South Wales, in association with Create NSW (formerly Arts NSW).

== Categories ==
In 2025 a prize of A$15,000 was set for each of the following awards, with a total prize pool of A$85,000.

=== Australian History Prize ===
The Australian History Prize is awarded for a major work of non-fiction on Australian history. In 2014, an Australian Military History Prize was announced. Mike Carlton was the winner of this sub-category for his book First Victory (published by Random House).

Year	Winners	Work	Publisher
2026	Natalie Harkin	Apron-Sorrow / Sovereign-Tea	Wakefield Press
2025	Darren Rix and Craig Cormick	Warra Warra Wai	Scribner Australia
2024	Alecia Simmonds	Courting: An Intimate History of Love and the Law	La Trobe University Press, with Black Inc
2023	Alan Atkinson	Elizabeth and John: The Macarthurs of Elizabeth Farm	NewSouth Publishing
2022	Alexis Bergantz	French Connection: Australia's Cosmopolitan Ambitions	NewSouth Publishing
2021	Grace Karskens	People of the River: Lost Worlds of Early Australia	Allen & Unwin
2020	James Dunk	Bedlam at Botany Bay	NewSouth Publishing
2019	Meredith Lake	The Bible in Australia: A Cultural History	NewSouth Books
2018	Christina Twomey	The Battle Within: POWs in Postwar Australia	NewSouth Publishing
2017	Mark McKenna	From the Edge: Australia's Lost Histories	Melbourne University Publishing
2016	Stuart Macintyre	Australia's Boldest Experiment: War and Reconstruction in the 1940s	NewSouth Books
2015	Alan Atkinson	The Europeans in Australia	UNSW Press
2014	Joan Beaumont	Broken Nation: Australians in the Great War	Allen & Unwin
2013	Janet Butler	Kitty's War: The remarkable wartime experiences of Kit McNaughton	University of Queensland Press
2012	Russell McGregor	Indifferent Inclusion: Aboriginal People and the Australian Nation	Aboriginal Studies Press
2011	Penny Russell	Savage or Civilised?: Manners in Colonial Australia	UNSW Press
2010	Bain Attwood	Possession: Batman's Treaty and the Matter of History	Melbourne University Publishing
2009	Robin Gerster	Travels in Atomic Sunshine: Australia and the Occupation of Japan	Scribe
2008	Paul Ham	Vietnam: The Australian War	HarperCollins
2007	Libby Robin	How a Continent Created a Nation	UNSW Press
2006	Richard Broome	Aboriginal Victorians: a History Since 1800	Allen & Unwin
2005	Eileen Chanin and Steven Miller, with an introductory essay by Judith Pugh	Degenerates and Perverts: The 1939 Herald Exhibition of French and British Contemporary Art	Miegunyah Press at Melbourne University Publishing
2004	Stuart Macintyre and Anna Clark	The History Wars	Melbourne University Publishing
2003	James Bowen and Margarita Bowen	The Great Barrier Reef: History, Science, Heritage	Melbourne University Publishing
2002	Nadia Wheatley	The Life and Myth of Charmian Clift	HarperCollinsPublishers
2001	Tim Bonyhady	The Colonial Earth	Miegunyah Press at Melbourne University Publishing
2000	Peter Spearrit	Sydney's Century: A History	UNSW Press
1999	K.S. Inglis	Sacred Places: War Memorials in the Australian Landscape	Melbourne University Publishing
1998	Anne Whitehead	Paradise Mislaid: In Search of the Australian Tribe of Paraguay	University of Queensland Press
1997	Heather Goodall	Invasion to Embassy: Land in Aboriginal Politics in NSW, 1770–1972	Allen & Unwin

=== General History Prize ===
The General History Prize is awarded for a major work of non-fiction on international history.

Year	Winners	Work	Publisher
2026	Patricia A. O'Brien	Errol Flynn: The true story of Australia’s Hollywood icon	Allen & Unwin
2025	Robyn Arianrhod	Vector: A surprising story of space, time, and mathematical transformation	University of Chicago Press
2024	Katharine E. McGregor	Systemic Silencing: Activism, Memory, and Sexual Violence in Indonesia	University of Wisconsin Press
2023	Michael Laffan	Under Empire: Muslim Lives and Loyalties Across the Indian Ocean World, 1775–1945	Columbia University Press
2022	Mina Roces	The Filipino Migration Experience: Global Agents of Change	Cornell University Press
2021	Luke Keogh	The Wardian Case: How a Simple Box Moved Plants and Changed the World	The University of Chicago Press and Kew Publishing
2020	Kate Fullagar	The Warrior, the Voyager, and the Artist: Three Lives in an Age of Empire	Yale University Press
2019	Christina Thompson	Sea People: The Puzzle of Polynesia	Harper
2018	Sean Scalmer	On the Stump: Campaign Oratory and Democracy in the United States, Britain, and Australia	Temple University Press
2017	Sandra Wilson, Robert Cribb, Beatrice Trefalt & Dean Aszkielowicz	Japanese War Criminals: The Politics of Justice after the Second World War	Columbia University Press
2016	Ann McGrath	Illicit Love: Interracial Sex and Marriage in the United States and Australia	Nebraska University Press
2015	Warwick Anderson & Ian R Mackay	Intolerant Bodies: A Short History of Autoimmunity	Johns Hopkins University Press
2014	John Gascoigne	Encountering the Pacific in the Age of Enlightenment	Cambridge University Press
2013	Saliha Belmessous	Assimilation and Empire: Uniformity in the French and British Colonies, 1541–1954	Oxford University Press
2012	Tim Bonyhady	Good Living Street: The Fortunes of My Viennese Family	Allen & Unwin
2011	Shane White, Stephen Garton, Stephen Robertson and Graham White	Playing the Numbers: Gambling in Harlem Between the Wars	Harvard University Press
2010	Lisa Ford	Settler Sovereignty: Jurisdiction and Indigenous People in America and Australia, 1788–1836	Harvard University Press
2009	Warwick Anderson	The Collectors of Lost Souls: Turning Kuru Scientists into Whitemen	Johns Hopkins University Press
2008	Michael A. McDonnell	The Politics of War: Race, Class and Conflict in Revolutionary Virginia	University of North Carolina Press
2007	Christopher Clark	Iron Kingdom: The Rise and Downfall of Prussia, 1600–1947	Harvard University Press
2006	R. J. B. Bosworth	Mussolini's Italy: Life Under the Dictatorship 1915–1945	Allen Lane/Penguin Books
2005	Sally Neighbour	In the Shadow of Swords: on the trail of terrorism from Afghanistan to Australia	Harper Collins Publishers
2004	Edward Duyker	Citizen Labillardière: A Naturalist's Life in Revolution and Exploration 1755–1834	The Miegunyah Press at Melbourne University Publishing
2003	David Garrioch	The Making of Revolutionary Paris	University of California Press
2002	Ruth Wajnryb	The Silence: How Tragedy Shapes Talk	Allen & Unwin
2001	Rowena Lennox	Fighting Spirit of East Timor: The Life of Martinho da Costa Lopes	Pluto Press Australia
2000	Anna Lanyon	Malinche's Conquest	Allen & Unwin
1999	Inga Clendinnen	Reading the Holocaust	The Text Publishing Company
1998	Marsden Hordern	King of the Australian Coast: the Work of Phillip Parker King in the Mermaid and Bathurst 1817–1822	Melbourne University Press
1997	Patricia Jalland	Death in the Victorian Family	Oxford University Press

=== NSW Community and Regional History Prize ===
The NSW Community and Regional History Prize is awarded for a major work of non-fiction that makes a significant contribution to understanding of any aspect of the history of New South Wales.

Year	Winners	Work	Publisher
2026	Mark Skelsey	Views to Die For	Trafalgar Publishing
2025	Alana Piper	Yirranma Place: Stories of a Darlinghurst corner	NewSouth Publishing
2024	Shauna Bostock	Reaching Through Time: Finding my family's stories	Allen & Unwin
2023	Ian Hodges	He Belonged to Wagga: The Great War, the AIF and returned soldiers in an Australian country town	Australian Scholarly Publishing
2022	Kate Holden	The Winter Road: A Story of Legacy, Land, and a Killing at Croppa Creek	Black Inc. Books
2021	Matthew Colloff	Landscapes of Our Hearts: Reconciling People and Environment	Thames & Hudson Australia
2020	Callum Clayton-Dixon	Surviving New England: A History of Aboriginal Resistance and Resilience Through the First Forty Years of Colonial Apocalypse	Nēwara Aboriginal Corporation
2019	Jon Rhodes	Cage of Ghosts	Darkwood
2018	Paul Irish	Hidden in Plain View: The Aboriginal People of Coastal Sydney	NewSouth Publishing
2017	Peter Hobbins, Ursula K Frederick & Anne Clarke	Stories from the Sandstone: Quarantine Inscriptions from Australia's Immigrant Past	Arbon Publishing
2016	Tanya Evans	Fractured Families: Life on the Margins in Colonial New South Wales	University of New South Wales Press
2015	Babette Smith	The Luck of the Irish : How a Shipload of Convicts Survived the Wreck of the Hive to Make a New Life in Australia	Allen & Unwin
2014	Ian Hoskins	Coast: A History of the New South Wales Edge	NewSouth
2013	Patti Miller	The Mind of a Thief	Queensland University Press
2012	Deborah Beck	Set in Stone: A History of the Cell Block Theatre	UNSW Press
2011	Stephen Gapps	Cabrogal to Fairfield City: A History of a Multicultural Community	Fairfield City Council
2010	Pauline Curby	Randwick	Randwick Municipal Council
2009	David Bollen	Up on the Hill: A History of St Patrick's College	UNSW Press
2008	Dianne Johnson	Sacred Waters: the story of the Blue Mountains Gully Traditional Owners	Halstead Press
2007	Regina Ganter	Mixed Relations: Asian Aboriginal Contact in North Australia	University of Western Australia Press
2006	Maria Nugent	Botany Bay: Where Histories Meet	Allen & Unwin
2005	Joe Hajdu	Samurai in the Surf: the arrival of the Japanese on the Gold Coast in the 1980s	Pandanus Books
2004	Patricia Crawford and Ian Crawford	Contested Country: A History of the Northcliffe Area, Western Australia	University of Western Australia Press
2003	Erik Eklund	Steel Town: The Making and Breaking of Port Kembla	Melbourne University Publishing
2002	John Bailey	The White Divers of Broome: the true story of a fatal experiment	Pan Macmillan Australia
2001	Carolyn Wadley Dowley	Through Silent Country	Fremantle Arts Centre Press
2000	Sherry Morris	Wagga Wagga: A History	Bobby Graham Publishers for Wagga Wagga City Council
1999	Janet McCalman	Sex and Suffering: Women's Health and a Women's Hospital: the Royal Women's Hospital, Melbourne, 1856 – 1996	Melbourne University Press
1998	Grace Karskens	The Rocks: Life in Early Sydney	Melbourne University Press
1997	Christopher Cunningham	The Blue Mountains Rediscovered	Kangaroo Press

=== Young People's History Prize ===
The Young People's History Prize (known as the Children's History Prize until 2002) is awarded for a work that increases the understanding and appreciation of history by children and/or young adults.

Year	Winners	Work	Publisher
2026	Lawrinson Julia	Trapped!	Fremantle Press
2025	Sophie Masson	Our History: Bold Ben Hall	Walker Books
2024	Rebecca Lim	Two Sparrowhawks in a Lonely Sky	Allen & Unwin
2023	Emily Gale	The Goodbye Year	Text Publishing
2022	Shaa Smith, Neeyan Smith, Uncle Bud Marshall, with Yandaarra including Sarah Wright, Lara Daley and Paul Hodge	The Dunggiirr Brothers and the Caring Song of the Whale	Allen & Unwin
2021	Archie Roach	Tell Me Why for Young Adults	Simon & Schuster
2020	Pierre-Jacques Ober, Jules Ober, and Felicity Coonan	The Good Son: A Story from the First World War, Told in Miniature	Candlewick Press
2019	Alison Lloyd and Terry Denton	The Upside-down History of Down Under	Penguin
2018	Simon Mitchell	The Fighting Stingrays	Penguin Random House Australia
2017	Christobel Mattingley	Maralinga's Long Shadow: Yvonne's Story	Allen & Unwin
2016	James Roy and Noël Zihabamwe	One Thousand Hills	Omnibus Books, Scholastic Australia
2015	Ruth Starke and Robert Hannaford	My Gallipoli	Penguin Books Australia
2014	Nadia Wheatley, illustrated by Ken Searle	Australians All	Allen & Unwin
2013	Jackie French	Pennies for Hitler	HarperCollins Publishers
2012	Stephanie Owen Reeder	Amazing Grace: An Adventure at Sea	National Library of Australia
2011	Kirsty Murray	India Dark	Allen & Unwin
2010	Jackie French	The Night They Stormed Eureka	HarperCollins
2009	Anthony Hill	Captain Cook's Apprentice	Penguin
2008	Robert Lewis and Tim Gurry	Australians in the Vietnam War	Ryebuck Media
2007	John Nicholson	Songlines and Stone Axes	Allen & Unwin
2006	Pamela Freeman	The Black Dress: Mary MacKillop's Early Years	Black Dog Books
2005	Allan Baillie	My Story: Riding with Thunderbolt, the diary of Ben Cross, Northern NSW, 1865	Scholastic Press: an imprint of Scholastic Australia Pty Ltd
2004	David Hollinsworth	They Took the Children	Working Title Press in association with Scholastic Australia
2003	Alan Tucker	My Story: The Bombing of Darwin, The Diary of Tom Taylor	Scholastic Press, Scholastic Australia
2002	Papunya School	Papunya School Book of Country and History	Allen & Unwin
2001	No award		
2000	Gael Jennings and Roland Harvey (illus.)	Sick As: Bloody Moments in the History of Medicine	Roland Harvey Books
1999	No award		
1998	Bruce Scates and Raelene Frances	Women and the Great War	Cambridge University Press
1997	Jennifer Lawless, Kate Cameron and Carmel Young	Unlocking the Past: Preliminary Studies in the Ancient World	Nelson ITP

=== Digital History Prize ===
The Digital History Prize (known as The Audio/Visual History Prize until 2009 and the Multimedia Prize until 2019) is awarded for an Australian historian's interpretation of an historical subject using non-print media.

Year	Winners	Work	Publisher
2026	Sienna Brown & Ben Etherington	History Lab: Caribbean Echoes (Episodes 1 and 3, Season 7)	Impact Studios, the University of Technology Sydney
2025	Larissa Behrendt, Michaela Perske and Clare Wright	One Mind, One Heart	Pursekey Productions
2024	Allen Clarke, Jacob Hickey, Darren Dale and Belinda Mravicic	The Dark Emu Story	Blackfella Films
2023	Rachel Perkins, Darren Dale, Jacob Hickey and Don Watson	The Australian Wars, Episode 1	Blackfella Films
2022	Katherine Biber, Loretta Parsley	The Last Outlaws	Impact Studios, the University of Technology Sydney
2021	Laurence Billiet	Freeman	General Strike and Matchbox Pictures
2020	Noëlle Janaczewska, Ros Bluett and Russell Stapleton	Experiment Street — the true history of a city lane	ABC Radio National: The History Listen
2019	Guardian Australia	The Killing Times	Guardian Australia and the University of Newcastle Colonial Massacres Research Team
2018	Warwick Thornton and Brendan Fletcher	We Don't Need a Map	Barefoot Communications
2017	Adam Clulow	The Amboyna Conspiracy Trial	Roy Rosenzweig Center for History and New Media
2016	Victoria Midwinter Pitt and Alan Erson	Afghanistan: Inside Australia's War	Essential Media & Entertainment
2015	Dan Goldberg and Margie Bryant	Brilliant Creatures	Mint Pictures & Serendipity Productions
2014	Michelle Arrow, Catherine Freyne and Timothy Nicastri	Public Intimacies: The 1974 Royal Commission on Human Relationships	ABC Radio National Hindsight
2013	Scott Hill and Jacqui Newling	The Cook and the Curator: Eat Your History	Sydney Living Museums
2012	Catherine Freyne and Phillip Ulman	Tit for Tat: The Story of Sandra Wilson	Hindsight, ABC Radio National
2011	Sonia Bible	Recipe for Murder	Stray Dog Pictures Pty Ltd for Jumping Dog Productions
2009	Rachel Landers and Dylan Bowen	A Northern Town	Pony Films
2008	Paul Rudd, Matthew Thomason, Wain Fimeri and Anthony Wright	Captain Cook: Obsession and Discovery	Film Australia, Cook Films, Ferns Productions, South Pacific Films, December Films, ABC
2007	John Hughes	The Archive Project: The Realist Film Unit in Cold War Australia	Early Works – ABC TV
2006	Rolf de Heer	Ten Canoes	Vertigo Productions/Adelaide Festival of Arts
2005	Trevor Graham	Hula Girls	(Electric Pictures Pty Ltd, 2005)
2004	Tom Murray in collaboration with the Dhuruputjpi and Yilpara communities	Dhakiyarr vs the King	Film Australia
2003	Marée Delofski	The Trouble With Merle	Film Australia in association with SeeView Pictures
2002	Anita Heiss and Terri McCormack	Barani: Sydney's Aboriginal History (website)	City of Sydney Web Team and History Program in conjunction with CyberDreaming, 2002
2001	Michael Cummins	Thomson of Arnhem Land	Film Australia in association with John Moore (director/producer), Martin Thiele (archival researcher) and Michael McMahon (producer)
2000	Martin Thomas	This is Jimmy Barker	ABC Radio Audio Arts
1999	Michelle Rayner	Passes and Pathways	ABC Radio National
1998	Trevor Graham (director & co-producer)	Mabo: Life of an Island Man	Film Australia
1997	Bill Bunbury	Unfinished Business, episodes 1–6 Hindsight,	ABC Radio

=== Anzac Memorial Trustees Military History Prize ===
The Anzac Memorial Trustees Military History Prize is awarded for a work of non-fiction on the involvement of Australians in wars, campaigns, battles and/or peacekeeping operations represented in the Anzac Memorial's Hall of Service. Sponsored by the Anzac Memorial Trustees, this prize was first awarded in 2023.

Year	Winners	Work	Publisher
2026	Daniel Reynaud & Emanuela Reynaud	The Anzac Table	Hardie Grant Media
2025	Patricia Collins	Rock and Tempest: Surviving Cyclone Tracy and its aftermath	Hachette Australia
2024	Kristen Alexander	Kriegies: The Australian Airmen of Stalag Luft III	Kristen Alexander
2023	June Factor	Soldiers and Aliens: Men in the Australian Army's employment companies during World War II	Melbourne University Publishing

== Former categories ==
=== State Records – John and Patricia Ward History Prize ===
This prize was first awarded in 2002 to encourage the use of archives in the writing of history. The State Record established the prize in recognition of the contribution to history and archives of NSW by John and Patricia Ward.

Year	Author	Title	Publisher
2008	Christina Twomey	Australia's Forgotten Prisoners: Civilians Interned by the Japanese in World War Two	Cambridge University Press
2007	Klaus Neumann	In the Interest of National Security: Civilian Internment in Australia	National Archives of Australia
2006	Gwenda Tavan	The Long, Slow Death of White Australia	Scribe Publications Pty Ltd
2005	Tony Roberts	Frontier Justice: a history of the Gulf Country to 1900	UQP
2004	Bain Attwood	Rights for Aborigines	Allen & Unwin
2003	David Kent and Norma Townsend	The Convicts of the Eleanor: Protest in Rural England; New Lives in Australia	The Merlin Press Ltd. [UK] and Pluto Press Australia
2002	Thom Blake	A Dumping Ground: A History of the Cherbourg Settlement	UQP

=== Centenary of Federation Prize, 2001 ===
The centenary award was created as a one-off presentation, the prize being sponsored by the NSW Centenary of Federation Committee. This award was for a "major work" relating to the Australian Federation period focussing on the political, social and cultural issues of Australia at that time.

==== Winners ====
Author	Title	Publisher
Geoffrey Bolton	Edmund Barton	Allen & Unwin

==== Shortlisted ====
Author	Title	Publisher
Peter Botsman	The Great Constitutional Swindle: a citizen's view of the Australian Constitution	Pluto Press, Australia
Helen Irving	The Centenary Companion to Australian Federation	Cambridge University Press

== See also ==
- Australian literature
- List of Australian literary awards
- List of history awards
- Australian History Awards
- Victorian Community History Awards
- Northern Territory History Awards
- Prime Minister's Prize for Australian History
