= Kate Darian-Smith =

Australian historian

Kate Darian-Smith FASSA
- Born: Katherine Darian-Smith; 25 February 1961 (age 65); Sydney, New South Wales, Australia
- Awards: Fellow of the Academy of the Social Sciences in Australia (2008)

Academic background
- Education: University of Melbourne (BA [Hons], PhD, DipEd)

Academic work
- Discipline: History
- Institutions: University of Sydney (1989–91); Ballarat University College (1991–92); University of London (1992–94); University of Melbourne (1995–2017); University of Tasmania (2017–)

Katherine Darian-Smith, FASSA (born 25 February 1961) is an Australian social historian and academic. She was executive dean and pro vice-chancellor at the University of Tasmania.

== Early life and education ==
Katherine Darian-Smith was born in Sydney, New South Wales, in 1961. She is the daughter of neuroscientist Ian Darian-Smith, who became a professor at the University of Melbourne in 1972. She was educated at Kew High School and then the University of Melbourne, receiving a Bachelor of Arts with Honours in 1983 and a Doctor of Philosophy in 1988.

== Career ==
Prior to her appointment as lecturer at the University of Melbourne in 1995, Darian-Smith had worked in the history department of the University of Sydney, at Ballarat University College and spent 1992 to 1994 at the University of London as deputy director, Sir Robert Menzies Centre for Australian Studies.

Between 2017 and 2024 Darian-Smith was the executive dean and pro vice-chancellor of the College of Arts, Law and Education at the University of Tasmania. She remains an honorary professorial fellow of the University of Melbourne.

Darian-Smith was elected Fellow of the Academy of the Social Sciences in Australia in 2008, and since 2019 has held a position on its executive committee. She is on the editorial board of History Compass for the Australasia and Pacific region.

== Selected works ==
- Darian-Smith, K (1990). On the Home Front: Melbourne in wartime, 1939–1945. Melbourne: Melbourne University Press. ISBN 9780195531268.
- Darian-Smith, Kate; Hamilton, Paula, eds. (1994). Memory and History in Twentieth-century Australia. Melbourne: Oxford University Press. ISBN 0-19-553569-3.
- Driscoll, Catherine; Darian-Smith, Kate, eds. (2017). Cultural Sustainability in Rural Communities: Rethinking Australian country towns. London: Routledge. ISBN 978-1-4724-6864-2.
- Darian-Smith, Kate; Willis, Julie, eds. (2017), Designing Schools: Space, place and pedagogy, Routledge, an imprint of the Taylor & Francis Group, ISBN 978-1-138-88622-3
