= Clare Anderson =

British historian and academic

Clare Anderson, FBA, , FRHistS (born 1969) is a British historian and academic, specialising in colonial history, penal colonies, and forced migration. She has been Professor of History at the University of Leicester since 2011. She joined the University from the University of Warwick having previously been a lecturer at Leicester since 1997.

In 2015, Anderson was elected Fellow of the Royal Historical Society (FRHistS). In July 2023, she was elected Fellow of the British Academy (FBS), the United Kingdom's national academy for the humanities and social sciences.

== Selected works ==
- Anderson, Clare (2007). Indian Uprising of 1857-58: prisons, prisoners, and rebellion. London; New York: Anthem Press. ISBN 978-1843312499.
- Anderson, Clare (2012). Subaltern lives: biographies of colonialism in the Indian Ocean world, 1790-1920. Critical Perspectives on Empire. Cambridge: Cambridge University Press. ISBN 978-1107015098.
- Anderson, Clare (2021). Convicts: a global history. Cambridge: Cambridge University Press. ISBN 978-1108840729.
