= Ken Inglis =

Australian historian

Ken Inglis AO, FASSA
- Born: 7 October 1929; Ivanhoe, Victoria
- Died: 1 December 2017 (aged 88); Carlton, Victoria
- Awards: FAW National Literary Award (1998); Ernest Scott Prize (1999); The Age Book of the Year (1999); The Age Non-fiction Award (1999); New South Wales Premier's Australian History Prize (1999)

Academic background
- Education: University of Melbourne (BA [Hons], MA); University of Oxford (DPhil)

Academic work
- Institutions: Australian National University; University of Papua New Guinea; University of Adelaide
- Doctoral students: Frank Bongiorno
- Notable students: Bill Gammage; Hank Nelson
- Main interests: Australian history Military history, memory and memorialisation
- Notable works: Sacred Places (1998)

Kenneth Stanley Inglis, AO, FASSA (7 October 1929 – 1 December 2017) was an Australian historian.

== Early life and education ==
Inglis was born in the Melbourne suburb of Ivanhoe, on 7 October 1929, the son of Stan and Rene Inglis. He was educated at Tyler Street Public School, Northcote Boys' High School and Melbourne High School, before going to study at the University of Melbourne. Inglis participated in the Student Christian Movement and amateur dramatics during his studies, and worked as a tutor at Ormond College. After graduating with a Bachelor of Arts with first class honours in History and English, he read for a Master of Arts at Melbourne. Inglis's thesis, which was a history of the Royal Melbourne Hospital, was later revised and published as his first book, Hospital and Community (Melbourne University Press, 1958).

== Career ==
Inglis completed his Master's degree at the University of Melbourne and his doctorate at the University of Oxford. In 1956 he was appointed as a lecturer to the University of Adelaide. He subsequently became Professor of History at the Australian National University, and the University of Papua New Guinea.

Inglis wrote extensively on the Anzac tradition, the Stuart Case, war memorials, and the Australian Broadcasting Corporation. In 2008 he joined the Faculty of Arts at Monash University, Melbourne, as an adjunct professor.

== Awards ==
Sacred Places: War Memorials in the Australian Landscape won a number of awards:

- 1998: FAW Literature Award
- 1999: The Age Book of the Year and Non-fiction Award
- 1999: New South Wales Premier's Australian History Prize
- 1999: Ernest Scott Prize
- 1999: Centre for Australian Cultural Studies Award, Individual Prize

== Death and legacy ==
Inglis died, aged 88, on 1 December 2017 of pancreatic cancer.

Historian Tom Griffiths spoke at the launch of a book of essays about Inglis, titled "I Wonder": The Life and Work of Ken Inglis (edited by Peter Browne and Seumas Spark) at Readings Carlton on 10 March 2020.

== Personal life ==
Inglis's first wife, Judy Betharis, was an anthropologist, who nurtured his interest in social, cultural and emotional communities. His younger sister, Shirley Lindenbaum, was the medical anthropologist. After Judy's death in a car accident, Ken married Amirah Turner, a historian. The former Communist and one time Christian socialist, Amirah Inglis and Ken shared half a lifetime of scholarly collaboration and together had six children.

== Bibliography ==
- Inglis, K. S. (1958). Hospital and community : a history of the Royal Melbourne Hospital. Carlton, Victoria: Melbourne University Press.
- — (1961). The Stuart case. Kingsgrove, New South Wales: Halstead Press.
  - — (2002). The Stuart case (2nd ed.). Melbourne: Black Inc.
- — (1963). Churches and the working classes in Victorian England. London: Routledge and Kegan Paul.
- — (March 1965). "The Anzac tradition". Meanjin Quarterly. 24 (1): 25–44.
- — (1970). C. E. W. Bean, Australian historian. St Lucia, Queensland: University of Queensland Press.
- — (1974). The Australian colonists : an exploration of social history, 1788–1870. Carlton, Victoria: Melbourne University Press.
  - — (1993). The Australian colonists : an exploration of social history, 1788–1870 (2nd ed.). Carlton, Victoria: Melbourne University Press.
- — (1983). This is the ABC : the Australian Broadcasting Commission, 1932–1983. Assisted by Jan Brazier. Carlton, Victoria: Melbourne University Press.
  - — (2006). This is the ABC : the Australian Broadcasting Commission, 1932–1983 (2nd ed.). Melbourne: Black Inc.
- — (1985). The rehearsal : Australians at war in the Sudan, 1885. Adelaide: Rigby.
- —, ed. (1989). Nation : the life of an independent journal of opinion, 1958–1972. Assisted by Jan Brazier. Carlton, Victoria: Melbourne University Press.
- — (1998). John Lack (ed.). Anzac remembered: selected writings by K. S. Inglis. Parkville, Victoria: Department of History, University of Melbourne.
- — (1998). Sacred places: war memorials in the Australian landscape. Assisted by Jan Brazier. Carlton, Victoria: Miegunyah Press at Melbourne University Press.
  - — (2001). Sacred places: war memorials in the Australian landscape. Assisted by Jan Brazier (2nd ed.). Carlton, Victoria: Melbourne University Press.
  - — (2005). Sacred places: war memorials in the Australian landscape. Assisted by Jan Brazier (New ed.). Carlton, Victoria: Melbourne University Press.
  - — (2008). Sacred places: war memorials in the Australian landscape. Assisted by Jan Brazier (3rd ed.). Carlton, Victoria: Melbourne University Press.
- — (1999). Craig Wilcox (ed.). Observing Australia, 1959–1999. Carlton, Victoria: Melbourne University Press.
- — (2006). Whose ABC? The Australian Broadcasting Corporation, 1983–2006. Melbourne: Black Inc.
- Inglis, Ken; Seumas Spark & Jay Winter (2018). Dunera lives [volume 1] : a visual history. With Carol Bunyan. Clayton, Victoria: Monash University Publishing.
- —; — & — (2020). Dunera lives [volume 2] : profiles. With Carol Bunyan. Clayton, Victoria: Monash University Publishing.
