= Alan Atkinson (historian) =

Australian historian, academic and author

Alan Thomas Atkinson
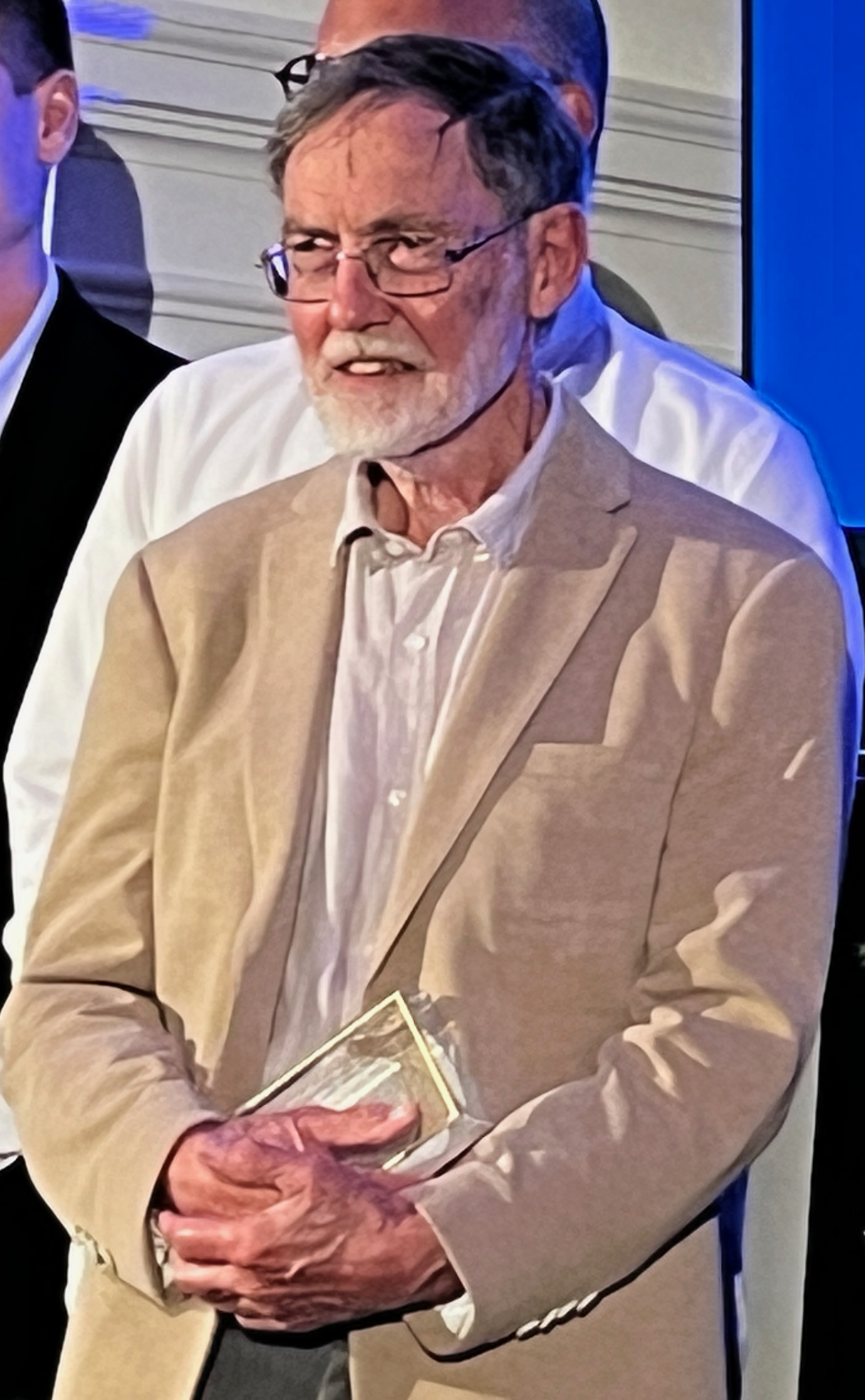
- Atkinson in 2023
- Born: 1946 (age 79–80)
- Awards: Fellow of the Australian Academy of the Humanities (1993); Ernest Scott Prize (1989, 2005, 2015, 2023); Douglas Stewart Prize for Non-Fiction (1997, 2015); Trevor Reese Memorial Prize (1998); Centenary Medal (2001); Victorian Prize for Literature (2015)

Academic background
- Education: University of Sydney; Australian National University; Trinity College Dublin
- Thesis: The Political Life of James Macarthur (1976)
- Doctoral advisor: A. W. Martin

Academic work
- Institutions: Australian National University; Murdoch University; University of New England
- Main interests: Colonial history
- Website: https://research-repository.uwa.edu.au/en/persons/alan-atkinson

Alan Thomas Atkinson (born 1946) is an Australian historian, academic and author. He is emeritus Professor at the University of Western Australia. Atkinson is the only historian to have won the Ernest Scott Prize more than twice (four in total). He has been described as "one of Australia's greatest ever historians".

== Education ==
Atkinson grew up on a cattle station in Southern Queensland. He attended Queensland Primary Correspondence School and The Armidale School.

Atkinson began a Bachelor of Arts in 1964 and went on to complete a Master of Arts (with first class honours) thesis at the University of Sydney in 1971, writing a dissertation entitled "The Position of John Macarthur and His Family in New South Wales before 1842" under supervision of John Manning Ward. He also received a Master of Education from Trinity College Dublin, writing a thesis entitled "A Review of Main Principles of History Teaching Applied in British and Irish Schools", in 1973.

== Academic career ==
For 27 years, Atkinson was a historian at the University of New England in Armidale, New South Wales. He was an Australian Research Council Professorial Fellow from 2003 to 2008 and a tutor at St Paul's College, University of Sydney. He has had visiting fellowships at the University of London, University of Cambridge and the University of Melbourne.

== Bibliography ==
=== Author ===
- — (1997). The Europeans in Australia: A History Volume One: The Beginning. Oxford: Oxford University Press. ISBN 9780195507089.
- — (2005). The Europeans in Australia: A History Volume Two: Democracy. Oxford: Oxford University Press. ISBN 9780195536423.
- — (2014). The Europeans in Australia: A History Volume Three: Nation. Oxford: Oxford University Press. ISBN 9780868409979.
- — (2022). Elizabeth and John: The Macarthurs of Elizabeth Farm. Sydney: UNSW Press. ISBN 9781742237565.
