= John La Nauze =

Australian historian

John Andrew La Nauze
- Born: 9 June 1911; Boulder, Western Australia
- Died: 20 August 1990 (aged 79); Canberra, Australia
- Awards: Fellow of the Academy of the Social Sciences in Australia; Fellow of the Australian Academy of the Humanities; Ernest Scott Prize

Academic background
- Education: University of Western Australia; University of Oxford

Academic work
- Institutions: Australian National University; University of Melbourne; University of Sydney; University of Adelaide; Harvard University
- Main interests: Constitutional history, economic history
- Notable works: The Making of the Australian Constitution (1972)

John Andrew La Nauze (9 June 1911 – 20 August 1990) was an Australian historian from Western Australia.

He was born in the Goldfields town of Boulder. Shortly after his fourth birthday, his Mauritian-born father Captain Charles La Nauze was killed by Turkish artillery fire at Silt Spur (southern ANZAC sector) Gallipoli. His mother moved the family to Perth where he attended South Perth Primary School and Perth Modern School. He completed degrees in Arts at the University of Western Australia and (as Rhodes Scholar for 1931) at Balliol College, Oxford before joining the Economics Departments at Adelaide (from 1935) and Sydney (1940–49).

In 1950 La Nauze became Foundation Professor of Economic History in the University of Melbourne, moving to the newly created Ernest Scott Chair in the Department of History in 1956. In 1966 he succeeded Sir Keith Hancock as Professor of History in the Institute of Advanced Studies at the Australian National University. On his retirement in 1977 he became the first Professor of Australian Studies at Harvard in 1978. In the Melbourne History Department he introduced courses in Later British History – which he believed essential to an understanding of Australian History — and fostered research in both fields.

La Nauze said that the Indigenous people of Australia were of interest as specimens of prehistory but had made no contribution to modern Australia:

“Unlike the West or South American Indians, unlike the Africans, the Australian aborigines could not even be exploited and enslaved. They could only be exterminated or driven further into the interior, or given, in charity, rations, cotton dresses, and religion. From them the Europeans could take nothing but the land they lived in.”

== Publications ==
- Political Economy in Australia (1949)
- Alfred Deakin (1962)
- The Hopetoun Blunder (1957)
- Federated Australia. Selections From Letters to the Morning Post 1900-1910. Deakin, Alfred. 1968 (Edited with introduction by)
- The Making of the Australian Constitution (1972)
- Walter Murdoch (1977)
