= Australian Academy of the Humanities =

Non-profit organisation

The Australian Academy of the Humanities
- Founded: 1969
- Type: Incorporated by Royal Charter
- Location: Canberra, Australia
- Origins: The Australian Humanities Research Council
- Region served: Humanities
- President: Stephen Garton
- Treasurer: Chris Hilliard
- Honorary Secretary: Elizabeth Minchin
- Executive Director: Inga Davis
- Website: http://www.humanities.org.au

The Australian Academy of the Humanities was established by Royal Charter in 1969 to advance scholarship and public interest in the humanities in Australia. It operates as an independent not-for-profit organisation partly funded by the Australian Government.

== History ==
The Australian Academy of the Humanities was established by Royal Charter in 1969. Its antecedent was the Australian Humanities Research Council (AHRC), which was convened informally in 1954 through the combined efforts of Brian R. Elliott and Professor A. N. Jeffares, who organised preliminary meetings in Melbourne of delegates drawn from the Faculties of Arts in Australian universities. The AHRC was a positive force in education and scholarship, and its activities gradually evolved, especially in its support for national projects in the humanities. Recognition among the AHRC executive of the changing functions of the Council led in 1967 to the proposal of establishing an Academy. Royal consent was granted to the petition on 25 June 1969, and Letters Patent issued, constituting the Academy from that date. The Academy's Foundation Fellows were the members the AHRC.

The highest distinction in scholarship in the humanities was required of candidates for election to the Fellowship of the Australian Academy of the Humanities. The first intake comprising sixteen Fellows (including Geoffrey Blainey, Kenneth Inglis, John Mulvaney, David Monro, Franz Philipp, Saiyid Rizvi, Oskar Spate and Judith Wright) and one Honorary Fellow (J. C. Beaglehole) were elected by the fifty-one Foundation Fellows at a Special General Meeting on 20–21 September 1969. Annual elections have taken place since that time.

For an account of the debates and efforts that led to the establishment of the Academy, see the article by Graeme Davison FAHA in the inaugural edition of Humanities Australia: 'Phoenix Rising: The Academy and the Humanities in 1969'.

== Governance ==
The Academy is governed by a Council of leaders in the humanities, elected from among its Fellows, who provide strategic direction, policy guidance, and management oversight. The Council meets four times a year. A Canberra-based Secretariat is responsible for the day-to-day running of the Academy. In February 2023 Inga Davis succeeded Christina Parolin as executive director.

=== Council in 2026 ===
President: Professor Stephen Garton AM FAHA FRAHS FASSA FRSN (elected November 2020)

Vice-President & Honorary Secretary: Emeritus Professor Joanne Tompkins FAHA

International Secretary: Professor Véronique Duché FAHA

Treasurer: Professor Chris Hilliard FAHA

Editor: Professor Louise Edwards FAHA FASSA FHKAH

Immediate Past President: Professor Lesley Head FAHA FASSA

Members: Associate Professor Sarah Collins FAHA, Distinguished Professor Jean Burgess FAHA, Professor Emerita Susan Dodds FAHA, Professor Yixu Lu FAHA, Professor Christina Twomey FAHA FASSA

== Fellowship ==
The Academy comprises a Fellowship of over 730 of the most influential humanities researchers and practitioners in, or associated with, Australia. The post-nominal abbreviation for a Fellow of the Academy is FAHA.

The following twelve disciplines serve as the Fellowship's electoral sections:

- Archaeology
- Asian Studies
- Classical Studies
- Cultural and Communication Studies
- English
- European Languages and Cultures
- History
- Indigenous Studies
- Linguistics
- Philosophy and the History of Ideas
- Religion
- The Arts

Election to the Academy takes place at the Annual general meeting, following nomination by Council on the advice of the twelve electoral sections.

=== Foundation Fellows ===
At the date of the grant of the Royal Charter establishing the Australian Academy of the Humanities in 1969, there were 51 Members of the AHRC who became the Foundation Fellows of the new Academy.

An asterisk denotes a Fellow who was also a Foundation Member of the AHRC.

- David Malet Armstrong
- James Johnston Auchmuty*
- Arthur Llewellyn Basham
- Flora Marjorie Bassett
- John Bowman
- Ernest Bramsted
- Joseph Terence Burke*
- Alexander Cambitoglou
- Alan Rowland Chisholm*
- Charles Manning Hope Clark
- Raymond Maxwell Crawford*
- William Culican
- William Allan Edwards*
- Brian Elliott
- Ralph Elliott
- Ralph Barstow Farrell*
- Charles Patrick Fitzgerald
- Kathleen Elizabeth Fitzpatrick*
- Alexander Boyce Gibson*
- Gordon Greenwood*
- (William) Keith Hancock
- Ursula Hoff
- Alec Derwent Hope*
- Harold Arthur Kinross Hunt*
- John Andrew La Nauze*
- James R. Lawler*
- Ts'un-yan Liu
- Ian Ramsey Maxwell*
- Alexander George Mitchell*
- Harold James Oliver
- John Arthur Passmore
- Douglas Henry Pike
- (Archibald) Grenfell Price*
- Paul Redding
- George Federick Elliot Rude
- George Harrison Russell
- Richard Herbert Samuel*
- Alan George Lewers Shaw
- George Pelham Shipp*
- Keith Val Sinclair
- John Jamieson Carswell Smart
- Jacob Smit
- Bernard William Smith
- Alan Ker Stout*
- Theodor George Henry Strehlow
- Léon Tauman*
- Arthur Dale Trendall*
- Louis Augustus Triebel*
- Otto Berkelbach van der Srenkel
- John Manning Ward
- Francis James West
- Gerald Alfred Wilkes

=== Honorary Foundation Fellows ===
- Claude Thomas Bissell
- Herbert Cole Coombs
- Alexander Norman Jeffares
- John McManners
- Robert (Gordon) Menzies
- Kenneth Baillieu Myer
- Harold (Leslie) White

== Other academies ==
There are four other Learned Academies in Australia: the Australian Academy of Science (AAS), the Academy of the Social Sciences in Australia (ASSA), the Australian Academy of Technological Sciences and Engineering (ATSE), and the Australian Academy of Health and Medical Science (AAHMS). The five academies co-operate through the Australian Council of Learned Academies (ACOLA), formed in 2010.

== Sources ==
- The Australian Academy of the Humanities Royal Charter and By-Laws
