= Academy of the Social Sciences in Australia =

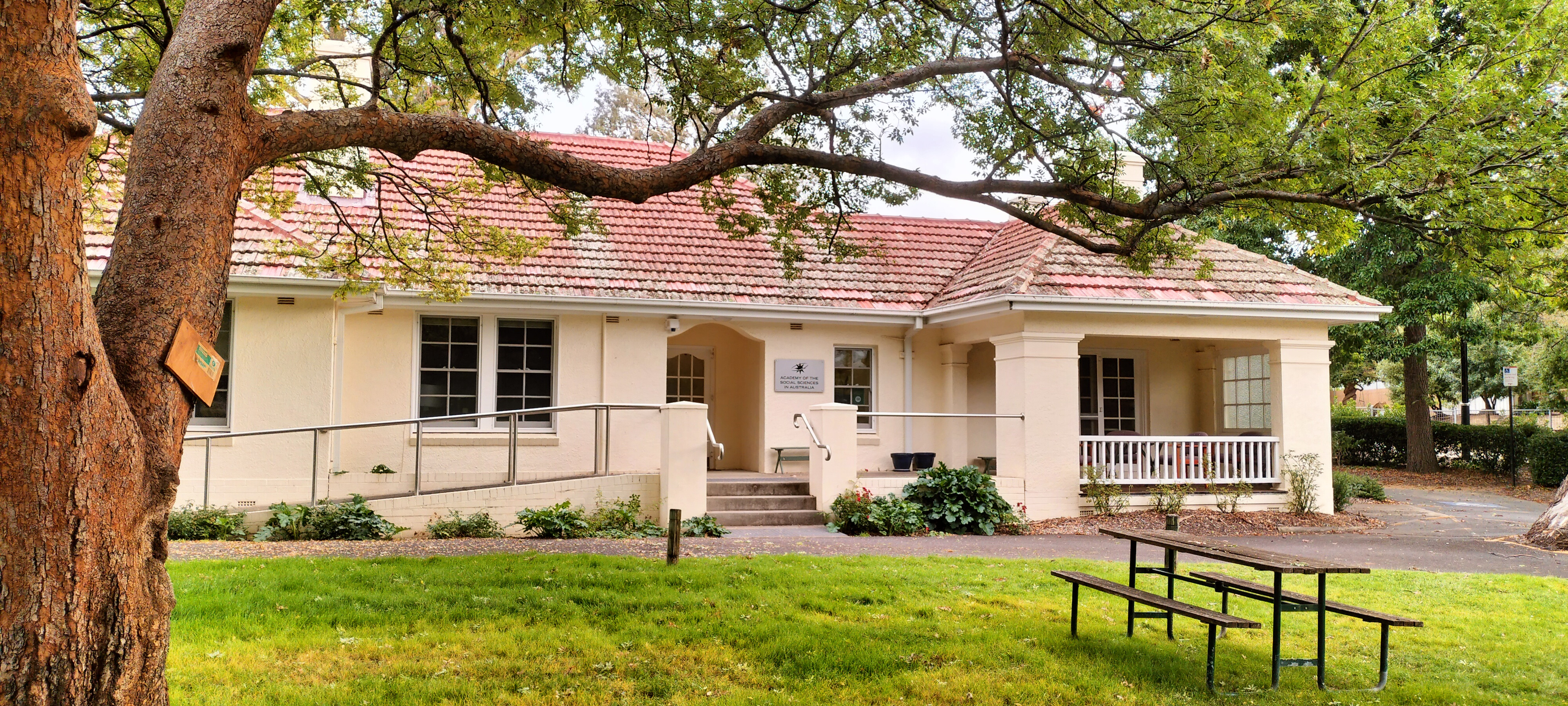
The Academy's National Office in Canberra

The Academy of the Social Sciences in Australia (ASSA) is an independent, non-governmental organisation devoted to the advancement of knowledge and research in the social sciences. It has its origins in the Social Science Research Council of Australia, founded in 1942.

The Academy was established in 1971 to recognise and champion excellence in the social sciences and to provide evidence-based advice on a range of social policy issues.

The Academy consists of an elected Fellowship of over 750 distinguished Australian social science researchers and professionals who work together to:

- Provide advice to governments on issues of national importance;
- Promote understanding and awareness of the social sciences; and
- Coordinate international cooperation and collaboration in the social sciences.

== Origins ==
ASSA's functions were originally fulfilled through the Social Science Research Council of Australia, which was founded in 1942. A timeline of events leading up to ASSA's formation in 1971 is as follows:

- 1942 – Members of the Australian National Research Council propose the establishment of a Social Science Research Council.
- 1943 – The Australian National Research Council considers the proposal and establishes a Social Science Research Committee.
- 1952 – Nine years later, the Social Science Research Committee resolves to become an autonomous body. A draft constitution for the new body is accepted by the Australian National Research Council and all members of the Committee are invited to become members of the new Social Science Research Council of Australia.
- 1953 – The new Council holds its first meeting with a membership of 44.
- 1957 – The Social Science Research Council becomes an incorporated association.
- 1970 – The Council adopts a recommendation that it become the Academy of the Social Sciences in Australia.
- 1971 – The Academy of the Social Sciences in Australia is incorporated on 7 July 1971. The 96 members of the Council become Fellows of the Academy.
- 2024 - The Academy updates its legal status from an Association incorporated in the ACT to a Company Limited by Guarantee.

== Fellowship ==
Fellows of the Academy include Australia’s leading researchers and practitioners across the breadth of social science disciplines, as well as a number of honorary Fellows (those who have made significant contributions to the social sciences beyond research), and overseas Fellows working outside of Australia.

To become a Fellow of the Academy individuals must be nominated by three existing Fellows, and have demonstrated an outstanding contribution to one or more fields of social science research or practice in Australia. Nominations are considered by the Academy’s disciplinary Panels, by independent assessors, then by the Membership Committee before being put to a vote of Academy Fellows in a general ballot.

As of 2026, there are over 750 Fellows of the Academy of the Social Sciences in Australia (FASSA). On election, each Fellow is assigned to one of four panels, depending on their discipline:

- Panel A: Anthropology, Demography, Geography, Linguistics, Sociology, Management.
- Panel B: Accounting, Economics, Economic History, Marketing, Statistics.
- Panel C: History, Law, Philosophy, Political Science.
- Panel D: Education, Psychology, Social Medicine.

== Governance ==
The Academy is a not-for-profit company limited by guarantee and a registered charity with Deductible Gift Recipient (DGR) status. It is governed by an elected Board of Directors responsible for strategy and direction, and its National Office is led by a CEO responsible for day-to-day management.

Sub-Committees of the Board include the Finance Committee, the Membership Committee, the Policy Committee, the International Committee, Education Committee and Grants and Awards Committee.

The President serves a three-year term with an additional year as President-Elect and two-years as Immediate Past-President.

From 1 January 2026, the Committee is composed of

- President (Chair): Kate Darian-Smith
- Immediate Past President: Richard Holden
- Treasurer: Stephen Taylor
- International Secretary: Adam Possamai
- Chair, Policy Committee: Mark Western
- Chair, Grants & Awards Committee: Marian Baird
- Chair, Education Committee: Lyn Yates
- Chair, Panel A: Felicity Meakins
- Chair, Panel B: Beth Webster
- Chair, Panel C: Nicholas Brown
- Chair, Panel D: Don Byrne
- CEO: Chris Hatherly

The Academy's National Office is located in Canberra in the suburb of Turner. A small team of staff work closely with the Academy's committees and Fellows to manage all aspects of the Academy's programs.

== Events, awards, and workshops ==
Each year, the Academy of the Social Sciences in Australia hosts and supports a wide range of social science or policy-focused lectures, forums, roundtables and other events around the country. Many of these events are free of charge and open to the public.

=== Events ===
The Annual Symposium is the highlight of the Academy's calendar. Convened by one or more Fellows and held over a full day in November, the Annual Symposium is a public forum examining an important issue in the social sciences and/or public policy arena.

The Academy also hosts a series of lectures over the year. These include, but are not limited to:

- Cunningham Lecture – presented by an eminent social scientist as part of the Annual events immediately following the Symposium. The Cunningham Lecture is named in honour of Kenneth Stewart Cunningham, Founding President of the Social Science Research Council.
- Fay Gale Lecture – presented each year by a distinguished female social scientist.
- Keith Hancock Lecture – presented each year by a distinguished social scientist nominated by the Academy Fellows.
- Paul Bourke Lectures – presented each year by each recipient of the Paul Bourke Awards for Early Career Research.

=== Awards ===
The Paul Bourke Awards for Early Career Research are named in honour of the Academy's past president Paul Francis Bourke (1938–1999) who was a product of the History school at the University of Melbourne and went on to become one of the first Australian historians to obtain American style doctoral training.

Whilst at Flinders University, he served as Professor of American Studies and also as Pro-Vice Chancellor. From Flinders University, he went on to become the Director of the RSSS at the Australian National University and also served as the President of The Academy of the Social Sciences in Australia (1993–1997). Amongst scholars, the contribution Paul made to the field of performance measurement is considered to be invaluable.

Based on nominations from Fellows, each Panel of the Academy will select one outstanding scholar to receive one of four Paul Bourke Awards. It is the intention of the Academy that the awards are presented to social science researchers who, at the time of nomination, do not yet hold an Associate Professor or Professorial appointment. Such persons are normally within five years of receiving their doctorate, but allowances are made for career interruptions.

The awards consist of a Citation and Medallion presented to each of the four winners at the Academy Annual Dinner. With the agreement of the winners' home university, a jointly sponsored lecture will be delivered by each of the winners during the year following receipt of the awards. The winners will also prepare a promotional article on their research to be published by the Academy.

The Rechnitz Memorial Award for "excellence in research leadership and advancement of knowledge of Indigenous society, culture and language" was inaugurated in 2025 and first awarded to Marcia Langton. This award complements a program of Rechnitz Fund grants for early- and mid-career Aboriginal and Torres Strait Islander researchers working in the social sciences. Both the Awards and the Grants are supported by a bequest from the estate of WWII deportee the late Rev Dr Wilhelm Rechnitz, who spent considerable time living and working in the Torres Strait Islands.

=== Workshops ===
The Academy's long-standing Workshop Program provides small grants to support interdisciplinary meetings discussing contemporary policy or research issues of interest to the social sciences. The workshops usually run for two-days and involve around 20 invited experts; mostly from the research sector, but also where relevant from government, the community sector or industry. It is a condition of funding that workshops are gender balanced in terms of speakers and participants, and include at least two early career researchers.

Each workshop supported by the Academy must also produce a report for online or physical publication by the Academy.

== Other academies ==
There are four other learned academies in Australia, those of Humanities (Australian Academy of the Humanities), Science (Australian Academy of Science), Technological Sciences and Engineering (Australian Academy of Technological Sciences and Engineering) and Health and Medical Sciences (Australian Academy of Health and Medical Science). The five Academies cooperate through Australian Council of Learned Academies (ACOLA), formed in 1995.
