= Historiography of Australia =

The historiography of Australia refers to the publications produced by historians of Australia, and the sources, critical methods, topics and interpretations they have used and examined. Many 19th century histories were written by prominent settlers or commissioned by colonial governments intent on influencing British policy in the colony or promoting British investment and immigration. Professional academic history began in the 1890s, dominated by "imperial" interpretations in which Australia was seen as an example of a flourishing British society in a new land.

20th century historiography up to the 1960s was dominated by competing imperial and nationalist interpretations. Nationalist historians emphasised an independent Australian identity forged in war, and a democratic ethos dating back to the goldfields of the 1850s. From the 1960s, these schools were challenged by historians using a variety of approaches including Marxist analysis of the Australian labour movement, geopolitical analysis of factors such as Australia's physical size and distance from Europe and America, and the role of luck and chance in shaping Australian society. From the 1970s, histories of marginalised groups such as Indigenous Australians, women, migrants and those with minority sexualities became more prominent.

At the turn of the 21st century, a series of public controversies dubbed "the history wars" sparked heated political and media debate over whether a "black armband" historical orthodoxy was overemphasising the importance of racism, violence, inequality and environmental degradation in Australia's history. Meanwhile, historical practice was becoming more diversified and less centred in universities, with the flourishing of oral histories, local histories, family histories, interdisciplinary studies and transnational approaches which analyse Australian history in a global and regional context.

== 19th century and imperial histories ==
According to Stuart MacIntyre, the first Australian histories, such as those by William Wentworth and James Macarthur, were polemical works written to influence public opinion and British government policy in the colony. After the Australian colonies became self-governing in the 1850s, colonial governments commissioned histories aimed at promoting migration and investment from Britain. The beginning of professional academic history in Australian universities from 1891 saw the dominance of an Imperial framework for interpreting Australian history, in which Australia emerged from the successful transfer of people, institutions, and culture from Britain. The apogee of the imperial school of Australian history was the Australian volume of the Cambridge History of the British Empire published in 1933.

== 20th century ==
Military history received government support after the First World War, most prominently with Charles Bean's 12 volume History of Australia in the War of 1914–1918 (1921–42). Bean's earlier work as Australia's official war correspondent had helped establish the Anzac legend which, according to McKenna: "immediately supplanted all other narratives of nationhood – the march of the explorers, the advance of settlement, Eureka, Federation and Australia's record of progressive democratic legislation."

Radical nationalist interpretations of Australian history became more prominent from the 1930s. Brian Fitzpatrick published a series of histories from 1939 to 1941 which sought to demonstrate the exploitative nature of Britain's economic relationship with Australia and the role of the labour movement in a struggle for social justice and economic independence. One of the most influential works of the radical nationalist trend was Russel Ward's The Australian Legend (1958) which sought to trace the origins of a distinctive democratic national ethos from the experiences of the convicts, bushrangers, gold-diggers, drovers and shearers. In the 1960s Marxist historians such as Bob Gollan and Ian Turner explored the relationship of the labour movement to radical nationalist politics.

The rapid expansion of university history departments in the 1950s and 1960s saw an increasing diversity of interpretations and specialisations in Australian history. A number of academic historians still worked within the imperial history tradition, while others explored the contribution of liberal, conservative and other traditions to Australia's distinctive political, cultural and economic development. In the first two volumes of his History of Australia (1962, 1968) Manning Clark developed an idiosyncratic interpretation of Australian history telling the story of "epic tragedy" in which "the explorers, Governors, improvers, and perturbators vainly endeavoured to impose their received schemes of redemption on an alien, intractable setting". According to MacIntyre, Clark "had few imitators and the successive volumes had a much greater impact on the public than the profession." The 1964 book The Lucky Country by Donald Horne was scathing in its observations of a complacent, dull, anti-intellectual and provincial Australia, with a swollen suburbia and absence of innovation–its title has been frequently misinterpreted as complimentary, though Horne meant it unfavourably. Another notable "big picture" interpretation of Australian history from this period is Geoffrey Blainey's The Tyranny of Distance (1966).

The 1970s saw a number of challenges to traditional imperial and nationalist interpretations of Australian history. Humphrey McQueen in A New Britannia (1970) attacked radical nationalist historical narratives from a Marxist New Left perspective. Anne Summers in Damned Whores and God's Police (1975) and Miriam Dixson in The Real Matilda (1976) analysed the role of women in Australian history. Others explored the history of those marginalised because of their sexuality or ethnicity. Oral history became an increasingly prominent addition to traditional archival sources in a number of topic areas. Wendy Lowenstein's Weevils in the Flour (1978), a social history of the Great Depression, is a notable early example.

There was also a revival in Aboriginal history. Notable works include Charles Rowley's The Destruction of Aboriginal Society (1970), Henry Reynolds' The Other Side of the Frontier (1981) and Peter Reid's work on Aboriginal children who had been removed from their parents. While Indigenous-settler relations remains an important field, Reid states that in the past few decades historians of Indigenous Australia have increasingly explored local histories and "the changing internal relations between individuals and family, clan and community."

Academic history continued to be influenced by British, American and European trends in historical method and modes of interpretation. Post-structuralist ideas on the relationship between language and meaning were influential in the 1980s and 1990s, for example, in Greg Dening's Mr Bligh's Bad Language (1992). Memory studies and Pierre Nora's ideas on the relationship between memory and history influenced work in a number of fields including military history, ethnographic history, oral history and historical work in Australian museums. Interdisciplinary histories drawing on the insights of fields such as sociology, anthropology, cultural studies and environmental studies have become more common since the 1980s. Transnational approaches which analyse Australian history in a global and regional context have also flourished in recent decades.

== 21st century ==
Historians such as McKenna, MacIntyre and others point out that in the 21st century most historical works are not created by academic historians, and public conceptions of Australia's history are more likely to be shaped by popular histories, historical fiction and drama, the media, the internet, museums and public institutions. Popular histories by amateur historians regularly outsell work by academic historians. The internet and developments in digital technology mean that individuals and community groups can readily research, produce and distribute their own historical works. Local histories and family histories have proliferated in recent decades. A 2003 survey by the University of Technology, Sydney found that 32 per cent of respondents had engaged in family history or a history-related hobby.

These developments, along with the prevalence of interdisciplinary histories, have led some Australian historians to question the boundaries of history as an academic discipline. MacIntyre has questioned the claim that specialised procedures and forms of communication can protect the discipline from "the natural impulses of humanity" and "popular history". Clark and Ashton have stated that: "The accessibility of history has fundamentally changed how we perceive the discipline and raises an important question: Can anyone be an historian today?" Historians have also questioned the boundaries between historical writing and other activities, particularly when they argue that groups have been marginalised by academic histories. Peter Reid states, "Aboriginal history today takes form in dance, art, novel, biography, autobiography, oral history, archival research, family papers, drama, poetry and film."

== History wars ==
The history wars were a series of public disputes about interpretations of Australian history involving historians, politicians and media commentators which occurred between approximately 1993 and 2007 but which had their roots in the revisionist histories from the 1970s and political debates about multiculturalism, Indigenous land rights, the stolen generations and national identity.

In a 1993 lecture, Geoffrey Blainey made a distinction between a "three cheers" view of history which saw Australian history as largely a success, and a "black armband" view which claimed that "much of Australian history was a disgrace". In 1996, the prime minister John Howard stated that he rejected black armband history which he defined as the view "that most Australian history since 1788 has been little more than a disgraceful story of imperialism, exploitation, racism, sexism and other forms of discrimination". In 1997, Howard repeated his criticism of black armband history in the context of the political controversies about Indigenous native title and the Stolen Generations.

A number of historians, including Henry Reynolds, Elaine Thompson and Don Watson, responded publicly, variously accusing the prime minister of seeking to rewrite history to exclude the critical analysis of Australia's past and of misrepresenting recent Australian historiography for political purposes. However, historian Patrick O'Farrell, agreed with John Howard that the "guilt school of Australian history has gone too far".

In August 1996, the Brisbane newspaper The Courier-Mail published a series of articles alleging that historian Manning Clark had been "an agent of influence" for the Soviet Union. The newspaper linked its allegations to current political debates about Australia's history. The Press Council later found that the newspaper's allegations were unfounded..

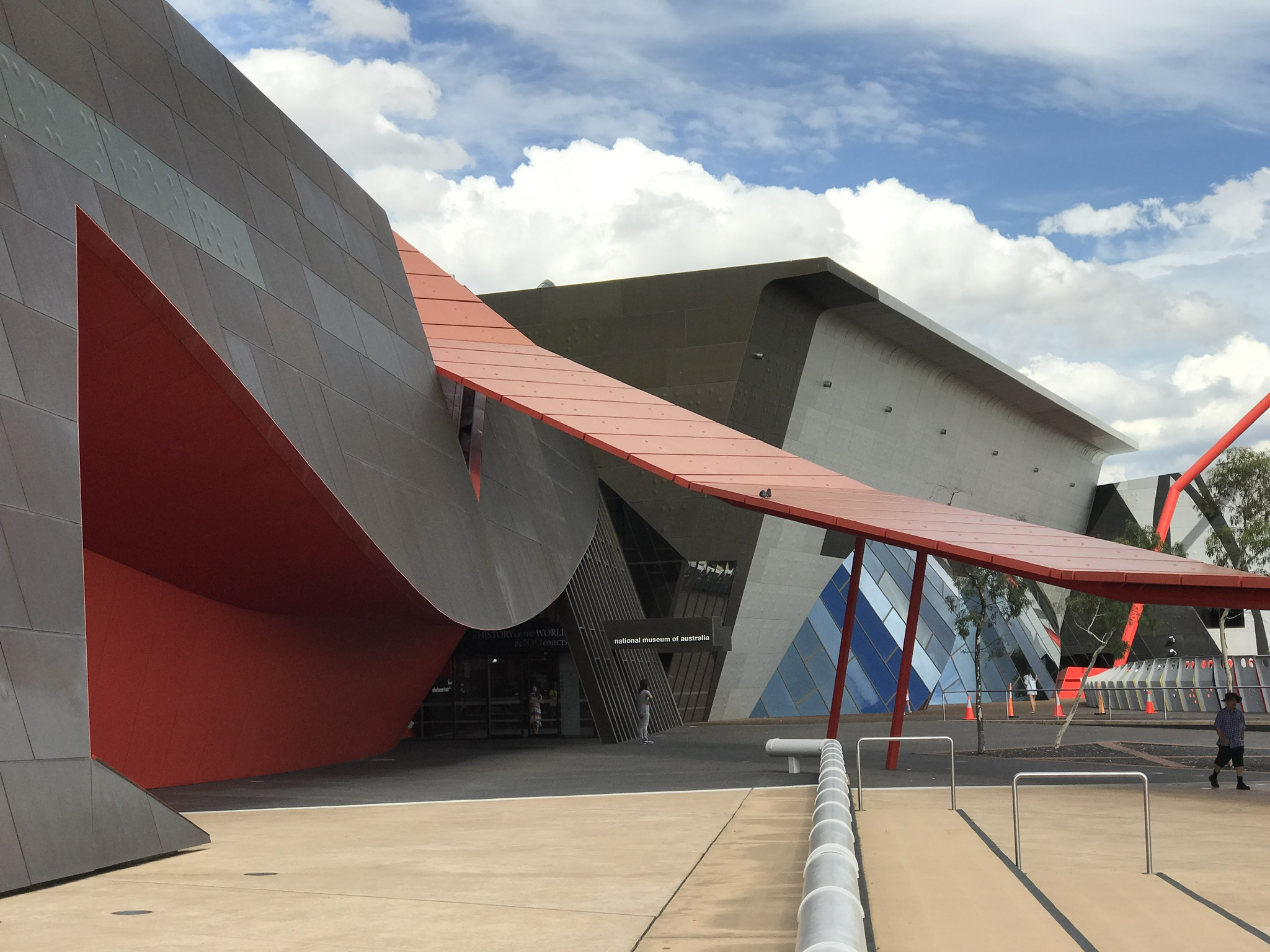
National Museum of Australia: Battlefront in the History Wars

The Human Rights and Equal Opportunities Commission (HREOC), in 1997, released its Bringing Them Home report on the forced removal of Indigenous children from their families. The authors of the report stated that the policy of forced removals amounted to genocide and called for an apology to, and compensation for, the victims. The government refused to offer a parliamentary apology, arguing that it might prejudice future legal actions and no government should be expected to apologise for the actions of previous governments. The release of the report and the government's response sparked a heated political, media and public debate about the facts of forced removals and the appropriate political response. A number of historians, including Janet McCalman and Anna Haebich, contributed to the political and academic debate.

In 2002, Keith Windschuttle published The Fabrication of Aboriginal History in which he argued that there had been no genocide of Aboriginal Tasmanians and that historians had systematically misrepresented evidence about the nature and extent of violence against Aboriginal Tasmanians for political reasons. Geoffrey Blainey praised the book and it sparked a widespread and often acrimonious academic, media and public debate about settler violence against Aboriginal people and about Windschuttle's criticisms of particular historians.

A new battlefront in the history wars opened in 2000 when the council of the National Museum of Australia commissioned the historian Graeme Davison to review the museum's inaugural exhibition for political bias. In 2003, a second review also found that there was no systemic political or cultural bias in the museum. A number of historians publicly criticised the inquiry as political interference in the independence of the museum. In 2006, the director of the museum, Peter Morton, stated: "I want people to come out [of the museum] feeling good about Australia."

== Sources and further reading ==
- Anderson, Zoe. "Reading ‘multiculturalism’: A historiography of policy and ideal in Australia." History Compass 11.11 (2013): 905-917.
- Bashford, Alison; Macintyre, Stuart, eds. (2013). The Cambridge History of Australia, Volume 2: The Commonwealth of Australia. Port Melbourne: Cambridge University Press. ISBN 9781107011540. online
- Broome, Richard (2019). Aboriginal Australians: A history since 1788 (5th ed.). Crowsnest, NSW: Allen & Unwin. ISBN 9781760528218.
- Busbridge, Rachel, Benjamin Moffitt, and Joshua Thorburn. "Cultural Marxism: Far-right conspiracy theory in Australia’s culture wars." Social identities 26.6 (2020): 722-738. online
- Clark, Anna; Ashton, Paul, eds. (2013). Australian History Now. Sydney: NewSouth Publishing. ISBN 9781742233710. online
- Elder, Catriona. Being Australian: Narratives of national identity (Routledge, 2020). online
- McGregor, Russell. "The necessity of Britishness: ethno‐cultural roots of Australian nationalism." Nations and Nationalism 12.3 (2006): 493-511.
- Macintyre, Stuart; Clark, Anna (2004). The History Wars (2nd ed.). Melbourne: Melbourne University Press. ISBN 0522851282. online
- Macintyre, Stuart (1999). "Australia and the Empire". In Winks, Robin (ed.). The Oxford History of the British Empire: Volume V: Historiography. Oxford University Press. ISBN 9780191542411. online
- Rickard, John. "Writing Music into Australian History." Musicology Australia 37.2 (2015): 269-279.
- Veracini, Lorenzo. "Ian Turner’s The Australian Dream and Australia’s 'settler transition'." Journal of Australian Studies 40.3 (2016): 302-318. online
- White, Richard. Inventing Australia (Routledge, 2020). online
