= Marilyn Lake =

Australian historian

- Born: Marilyn Lee Calvert; 5 January 1949 (age 77); Kettering, Tasmania, Australia
- Awards: Queensland Premier's History Book Award (2008); Prime Minister's Literary Award for Non-Fiction (2009); Officer of the Order of Australia (2018)

Academic background
- Education: University of Tasmania (BA Hons, MA); Monash University (PhD)
- Thesis: The limits of hope: soldier settlement in Victoria, 1915–1938 (1984)

Academic work
- Institutions: University of Melbourne; La Trobe University
- Main interests: Australian history Feminist theory and gender Nationalism and the World Wars
- Notable works: Creating a Nation (1994); Faith: Faith Bendler, Gentle Activist (2002); Drawing the Global Colour Line (2008)

Marilyn Lee Lake, AO FAHA FASSA (born 5 January 1949) is an Australian historian. She is known for her work on the effects of the military and war on Australian civil society, the political history of Australian women, and racism in Australia, including the White Australia Policy, and the movement for Aboriginal and Torres Strait Islander human rights.

She was awarded a personal chair in history at La Trobe University in 1994. She has been elected a Fellow, Australian Academy of the Humanities and a Fellow, Academy of the Social Sciences in Australia.

== Early life and education ==
Marilyn Lee Calvert was born on 5 January 1949 in Kettering, Tasmania.

She studied history at the University of Tasmania, where she resided at Jane Franklin Hall, and graduated with a Bachelor of Arts on 10 April 1968. That year she submitted her honours thesis, W.A. Wood's and the Clipper, 1903–1909: A Study in Radical Journalism, and was awarded Honours which was conferred on 2 April 1969.

On 11 April 1973 she was graduated Master of Arts by the University of Tasmania. Her thesis, on Tasmanian society in World War 1, became her first book, A Divided Society, in 1975.

She was graduated a Doctor of Philosophy by Monash University in 1984. Her doctoral thesis, "The limits of hope: soldier settlement in Victoria, 1915–1938" became a book with the same title in 1987.

== Career ==
In 1986, Lake was appointed a lecturer in History and Social Theory at The University of Melbourne.

In 1988, she was appointed senior lecturer and made foundational director of women's studies (1988–94) at La Trobe University. In 1991, Lake was appointed reader in the Faculty of Humanities and Social Sciences, La Trobe University. In 1994 she was elevated to professor of history in the Faculty of Humanities and Social Sciences at La Trobe, with a Personal Chair in History.

In 1997, she was visiting professorial fellow at Stockholm University.

In 2001–2002, she was the chair of Australian Studies at Harvard University.

Between 2004 and 2008 she was an Australian Research Council Australian professorial fellow at La Trobe University.

In 2008, she was a research fellow at the Australian Prime Ministers Centre in Canberra.

In 2011, Lake was awarded another Australian Research Council Professorial Research Fellowship "to investigate the international history of Australian democracy. She will research both the impact of Australian democratic innovation – manhood suffrage, the 8-hour day, the Australian ballot, women's rights – overseas, and Australian engagements with international organisations such as the ILO and United Nations, the translation of new human rights into citizenship rights, at home, in the twentieth century."

She is known for her work on the effects of the military and war on Australian civil society, the political history of Australian women, and racism in Australia, including the White Australia Policy and the movement for Aboriginal and Torres Strait Islander human rights.

== Research interests ==
Lake's research interests include Australian history; nation and nationalism; gender, war and citizenship; femininity and masculinity; history of feminism; race, gender and imperialism; global and trans-national history.

== Committees and voluntary work ==
Lake is a former president, Australian Historical Association.

Lake is a member of the reference group of the Australian Women's History Forum.

Lake is a member of the editorial boards of Labor History, Journal of Australian Studies and Social Politics: International Studies in Gender, State and Society, and was a member of the editorial board of Australian Historical Studies between 2006 and 2009.

Lake was a member of the La Trobe University Council between 1995 and 1997 and of Monash University Council between 1985 and 1989.

She was a Museum Victoria councillor from 1985 to 1989 and a member of the History Council of Victoria between 2001 and 2004.

She served as a member of the Sullivan's Cove Waterfront Authority between 2005 and 2009.

She was a director and board member, Victorian Women's Trust from 2005 to 2009.

== Awards and honours ==
Lake has received the following awards and honours:

- 1985, The University of Melbourne Harbison-Higinbotham Prize
- 1994, Human Rights Non-Fiction Award for Creating a Nation with Patricia Grimshaw, Marian Quartly and Ann McGrath
- 1995, elected Fellow, Australian Academy of the Humanities
- 1999, elected Fellow, Academy of the Social Sciences in Australia
- 2000, awarded Doctor of Letters (honoris causa), University of Tasmania
- 2002, Human Rights Arts Non-Fiction Award for Faith: a biography of Faith Bandler
- 2003, Centenary Medal
- 2006, Victorian Honour Roll of Women
- 2008, Queensland Premier's Literary Awards, History Book – Faculty of Arts, University of Queensland Award for Drawing the Global Colour Line (with Henry Reynolds)
- 2009, Prime Minister's Literary Award for non-fiction book Drawing the Global Colour Line (with Henry Reynolds)
- 2009, The University of Melbourne Ernest Scott Prize for Drawing the Global Line (with Henry Reynolds)
- 2018, appointed an Officer of the Order of Australia (AO) for "distinguished service to higher education, particularly to the social sciences, as an academic, researcher and author, and through contributions to historical organisations."
- 2019, NSW Premier's History Awards – General History Prize, shortlisted for Progressive New World: How Settler Colonialism and Transpacific Exchange Shaped American Reform (Harvard University Press).

In February 2019, Monash University Publishing released Contesting Australian History: Essays in Honour of Marilyn Lake edited by Joy Damousi and Judith Smart. The contents are papers presented at a two-day celebration of Lake's career held at the University of Melbourne in 2016.

== Major works ==
- A Divided Society (1975) ISBN 0522840809
- Double Time: Women in Victoria 150 Years (1985) (co-editor) ISBN 0140060022
- The Limits of Hope: Soldier Settlement in Victoria 1915–38 (1987) ISBN 0195546660
- Australians at Work: Commentaries and Sources (1991) (co-editor) ISBN 0869140655
- Creating a Nation (1994, reprinted 1996, 2000) (jointly) ISBN 0869140957
- Getting Equal: The History of Australian Feminism (1999) ISBN 186508137X
- Faith Bandler Gentle Activist (2002) ISBN 1865088412
- Connected Worlds: History in Transnational Perspective (2006) ISBN 1920942440
- Memory, Monuments and Museums (2006) ISBN 9780522852509
- Drawing the Global Colour Line (2008) with Henry Reynolds ISBN 9780521707527
- What's Wrong with ANZAC? The Militarisation of Australian History (2010) with Henry Reynolds ISBN 9781742231518
- Progressive New World: How Settler Colonialism and Transpacific Exchange Shaped American Reform (2019) ISBN 9780674975958
