= The Real Matilda =

1976 book by Miriam Dixson

- Author: Miriam Dixson
- Subject: Feminist history
- Genre: Non-fiction
- Publisher: Penguin Books
- Publication date: 1976
- Publication place: Australia
- Pages: 280
- ISBN: 9780140219388
- OCLC: 49569134

The Real Matilda is a 1976 non-fiction book of feminist history by Miriam Dixson. The book argues that Australian women have a significantly lower social standing than women in other Western nations, and attributes this to Australia's early colonial history. Dixson argues that the lower-class men who made up Australia's early convict population had a particularly low regard for women, and that their subjugation of women in the colony's early years has "imprinted" itself on contemporary Australian culture.

While the book received critical reviews from some feminists upon its release, it has since come to be regarded as a landmark work in Australian feminist history. New editions of the book were published in 1984, 1994, and 1999. The Real Matilda has been described as one of the catalysts for a new wave of feminist historiographies of Australia released in the years that followed its publication.

== Summary ==
The Real Matilda, titled after the song "Waltzing Matilda", argues that Australian women generally have a lower social standing than women elsewhere in the Western world. The book supports this argument through an analysis of Australian culture and the ways in which it excludes women, while also examining the ways in which women have been marginalised throughout Australian history. The work was described by the feminist scholar Jill Ker Conway as "an essay in psychohistory", and draws heavily on the theories of the political scientist Louis Hartz.

Dixson argues that the central reason for Australian women's comparatively low social standing lies in the nation's early colonial history. She notes that the majority of early arrivals in Australia were lower-class, many of them Irish, and says that these groups had a particularly low regard for women. She then argues that the social structures of early Australian history, including the sexual exploitation that was common during the era of convict transportation and the masculinised culture of the Australian frontier in the years that followed, led to deeply embedded gender inequalities. Dixson uses psychoanalytical techniques to examine the Australian "national character", arguing that it is rooted in male chauvinism. She also says that women have internalised this subjugated position, and that patriarchy is "imprinted" on Australia in the same way as an individual's formative childhood experiences.

== Background and publication history ==
The Real Matilda was written in the 1970s amidst the growth of the women's liberation movement in Australia. At the time the book was published, Miriam Dixson was a senior lecturer in history at the University of New England, with a background as a historian of the labour movement. The book was published by Penguin Books in 1976. New editions of the book were published in 1984 and 1994, with a new chapter added in each edition. A fourth edition of the book was published in 1999 with an added preface.

== Reception ==
The Real Matilda was criticised by some feminists upon its release for painting an overly pessimistic picture of the status of Australian women. Jill Conway wrote that the book saw women in a singular light as victims, and that Dixson gave little explanation of how women could overcome their psychological subjugation. Patricia Grimshaw argued that the book exaggerated the degree of Australian women's oppression. Ann Curthoys critiqued the book's linear argument about the development of Australian culture from the early colonial era to the modern day for neglecting the diversity of male and female experiences, and wrote that the book portrayed women as permanent victims.

Some reviewers were also unpersuaded by Dixson's analysis. Grimshaw proposed a counterargument, suggesting that Australian women's subjugation was instead the result of the emergence of family structures in the 20th century that pushed Australian women out of public life. Jan DeAmicis wrote that the book was an enjoyable read and that Dixson's argument was plausible, but that the book did not make a particularly persuasive case for her central thesis. Martha Macintyre argued that Dixson's mixing of psychological, sociological, and historical analysis failed to properly distinguish between the treatment of women at the individual and the collective level. She suggested that relying on the application of techniques of individual psychoanalysis to the development of Australian society as a whole resulted in "grotesque oversimplification" of the processes of social change. Despite her criticisms, she concluded that the work was a landmark achievement and marked a "daring and inspiring beginning" for Australian feminism.

=== Later reception ===
The Real Matilda has come to be regarded as a landmark text in the study of Australian feminist history. In comparing the work to Anne Summers' 1975 book of feminist history Damned Whores and God's Police, Ann McGrath wrote that while Summers argued for activism, Dixson "prescribed a kind of national psychoanalysis". Curthoys has identified The Real Matilda as one of four books published in 1975 and 1976 that marked a "turning point" in the study of Australian women's history. The book was described as one of the field's three founding texts by Rosemary Hunter.

Reviewers of later editions of the book have suggested that it remains a product of the era in which it was written. In 1997 Bonnie G. Smith wrote that the book served as a useful historical snapshot of the analytical techniques that were employed by the 1970s women's liberation movement, but that new theoretical developments—such as the emergence of post-colonial scholarship—had made its insights less robust. Reviewing the book's third edition in 1994, McGrath wrote that Dixson had not been successful in updating and refreshing the book to reflect scholarly advances since the book's initial publication, and that criticism of recent historiography that had been added to the new edition detracted from the work. In 2000, Summers wrote in a review of the book's fourth edition that the work had a staying power, but that Dixson had done little to update the premise of her original argument.
