= Damned Whores and God's Police =

1975 book by Anne Summers

- Author: Anne Summers
- Subject: Feminist history
- Genre: Non-fiction
- Publisher: Penguin Books
- Publication date: 1975
- Publication place: Australia
- Pages: 494
- ISBN: 9780140218329
- OCLC: 931672734

Damned Whores and God's Police is a 1975 feminist history of Australia by Anne Summers. The book combines historical, sociological, and literary analysis, as well as radical feminist theory. It compares Australian women to a colonised people who have been subjugated since the early colonial era by being cast as either "damned whores" or as "God's police". Summers argues that women's liberation relies on women casting off these dual archetypes of whore or mother.

While the book received a somewhat mixed reception upon its release, including criticism from some feminists, it is now widely regarded as a landmark text in the study of Australian feminist history. New editions of the book were released in 1994, 2002, and 2015, and more than 100,000 copies have been sold. The work is seen as having contributed to the development of a new wave of revisionist feminist histories of Australia in the years following its release.

== Summary ==
Damned Whores and God's Police is divided into two parts. The first opens with an analysis of the role that women play within contemporary Australian culture. Summers analyses women's writing and distinguishes "sexism by neglect" from "sexism by repression", arguing that women's writing has been trivialised and ignored within Australian culture. She also argues that many of the core elements of Australian recreational culture, from sport to gambling, structurally exclude women. She then analyses how family structures subjugate women, drawing on the theoretical frameworks developed by Frantz Fanon, in a chapter titled "A Colonised Sex". Summers compares women to a colonised people and argues that they must be given self-determination in order to liberate themselves. She describes multiple ways in which women have been colonised, including sexual violence, the medical profession's control of women's bodies, and the cultural imposition of gender stereotypes. She suggests that "colonising powers" deliberately divide women in order to maintain their control.

The second part of the book contains a historical analysis of women's role in colonial Australia, emphasising the development of their role as "moral guardians". Summers argues that in the early days of convict transportation to Australia, convict women were cast as "damned whores", and were raped and forced into prostitution by men. In the early nineteenth century, as Australia attempted to evolve from a convict settlement into a civilised society, newly arrived settler women were placed in the role of "God's police" as respectable wives and mothers. The later chapters of the book contain an analysis of how these roles have persisted in more recent Australian history. In the book's final chapter, "Prospects for Liberations", Summers analyses whether Australian women have the ability to escape their oppression. Summers concludes that women are a "colonised sex", with both archetypes—an Australian manifestation of the Madonna–whore dichotomy—serving to keep women subordinate to men. She argues that women will not be liberated until they escape from these dual roles as whores or mothers.

== Background and publication history ==
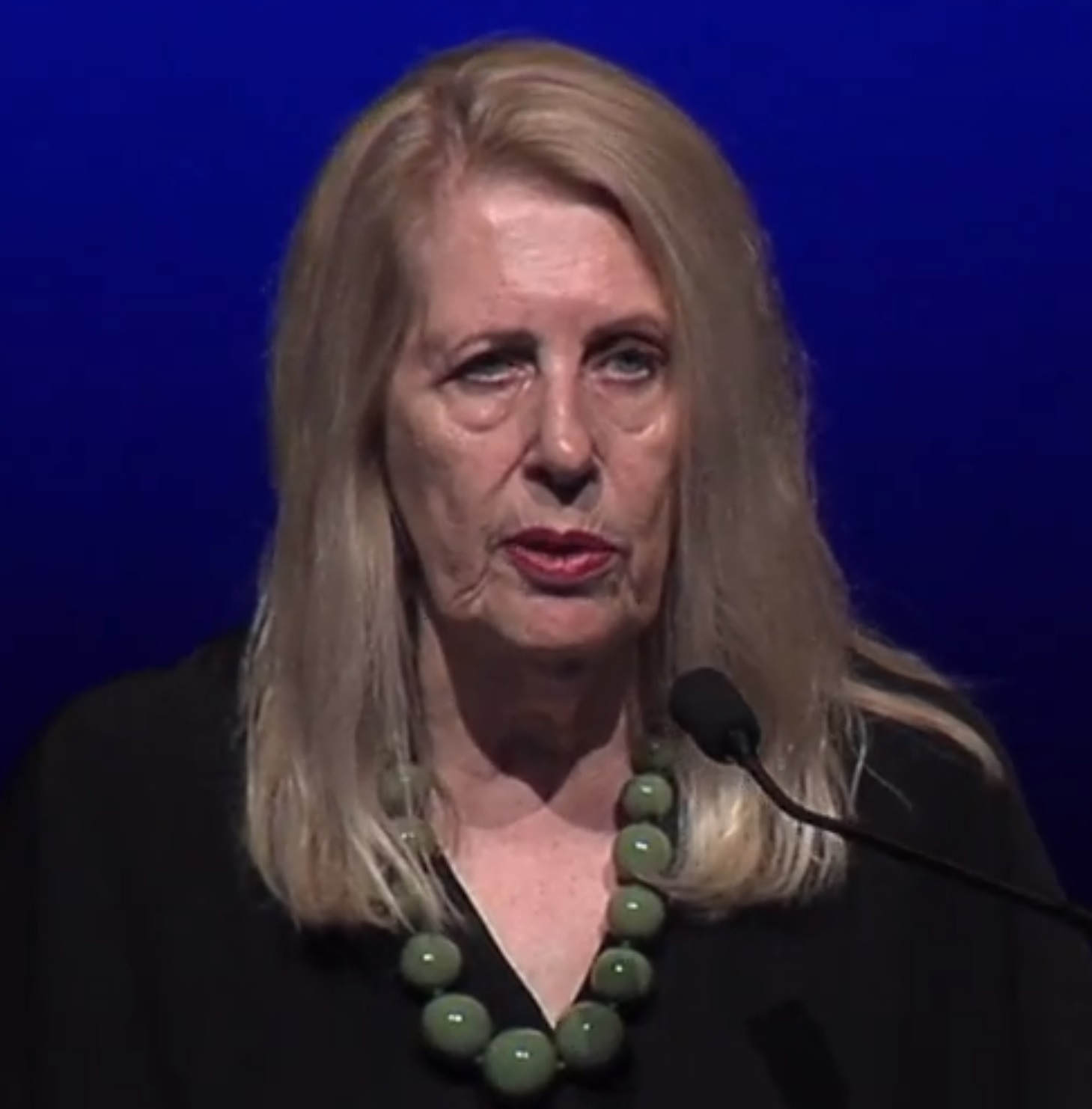
Anne Summers, the author of Damned Whores and God's Police

Damned Whores and God's Police was written in the 1970s amidst the growing strength of the women's liberation movement. At the time she wrote the book, Anne Summers was a PhD candidate at the University of Sydney and a member of the women's rights movement, having helped to found both the feminist journal Refractory Girl and Australia's first women's refuge. Summers spent three years writing the book and was supported by a Young Writers' Fellowship from the Australia Council. The book was published by Penguin Books in 1975.

New editions of the book were published in 1994, 2002, and 2015. The 1994 edition added a new introduction and a "letter to the next generation", while the 2002 edition added an author's note and an overview and timeline of achievements by Australian women. The 2015 edition added a new introduction and a longer version of the timeline from the 2002 edition. By the 2016 edition, the book's length had grown by roughly 250 pages through the addition of these various new introductions and author's notes. More than 100,000 copies of the book have been sold.

== Reception ==
=== Contemporary reception ===
Damned Whores and God's Police received some positive reviews upon its release, but was also criticised by some feminists. Reviewers praised the way in which Summers had combined literary, sociological and historical analysis with radical feminist theory, as well as the range of textual evidence that she had drawn on. Ann-Marie Jordens described the book as a "landmark" for Australian feminist literature in a review in the journal Labour History. In a review in The Sydney Morning Herald, John Douglas Pringle concluded that it was ultimately a "remarkable book" and a "striking achievement". However, the book was also criticised by some feminists and activists. The feminist academic Elizabeth Anne Reid described it as "devastatingly bad", criticising it for its limited analysis of class and for playing into women's self-perception as victims. Reid characterised Summers as an "educated, privileged" woman who failed to acknowledge working-class women's struggle for improved working conditions and employment opportunities. Jill Roe felt that the book relied on "intellectually indulgent assumptions".

Some reviewers were particularly critical of Summers' analogy between women's oppression and colonisation. Jill Ker Conway wrote in a review in the journal Signs that the book's application of post-colonial theory was flawed, and that Summers had an obsession with women's role as victims. In an analysis of the book published in History Workshop, Martha Macintyre likewise argued that the comparison of women to a colonised people—which she described as an elaboration upon an argument first advanced by Barbara Burris—was a flawed and poorly argued metaphor. She concluded that the book trivialises colonialism and neglects the racial and class dimensions of women's oppression.

Macintyre also argued that the book makes an overly simplistic assumption that Australian culture can be straightforwardly traced back to its early convict days, characterising Summers' argument as assuming "a sort of Australian Original Sin". She argued that while the whore–mother dichotomy may be a useful historical framework for understanding the earliest years of the Australian colony, it quickly breaks down and fails to acknowledge the diverse ways in which Australian society developed in the years that followed.

=== Later reception ===
Damned Whores and God's Police has come to be widely regarded as a landmark text in Australian feminist history. The feminist legal scholar Rosemary Hunter has described the book as one of the three "founding texts" of Australian feminist history, alongside Miriam Dixson's The Real Matilda and Kerreen Reiger's The Disenchantment of the Home. Ann Curthoys suggested in 1995 that Damned Whores and God's Police was one of four books published in 1975 and 1976 that had sparked a new wave of research into Australian women's history. Reviewing the book's second edition in 1997, McGrath described it as a canonical text in the field. In 2015, marking the 40th year since its publication, Michelle Arrow described the book as second only to Germaine Greer's The Female Eunuch in the canon of Australian feminism. She suggested that the book laid the foundations for more detailed studies of convict women, and that it had helped to drive the development of revisionist feminist histories of Australia.

Reviews of later editions of the book have described the text as having enduring historical relevance and readability, while also suggesting that it remains a product of the era in which it was written. In 1997, Ann McGrath wrote that the book was "punchy, witty, provocative, highly readable, often brilliant, and above all, accessible." She suggested that the book served to paint a useful picture of the ideas present at the height of the women's liberation movement in the 1970s. The historian Marian Quartly echoed these sentiments in a review of the book's 2016 edition, describing it as an accessible text that had an enduring relevance to historians due to its deep impact on the feminist movement, but as "a monument to a mighty historical achievement" rather than as something that would inspire ongoing activism.
