= Victorian Historical Journal =

- Discipline: History of Victoria (Australia)
- Language: English

Publication details
- Former name: Victorian Historical Magazine
- History: 1911-present
- Publisher: Royal Historical Society of Victoria (Australia)
- Frequency: Biannually

Standard abbreviations
- ISO 4: Vic. Hist. J.

Indexing
- ISSN: 1030-7710
- LCCN: 88648197
- OCLC no.: 16403248

Links
- Journal homepage; Online access; Online archive (1911-1954)

The Victorian Historical Journal is a biannual peer-reviewed academic journal covering the history of the Australian state of Victoria. It is the "official journal of record and scholarly publication" of the Royal Historical Society of Victoria. The journal was first published in 1911 as the Victorian Historical Magazine and has a long-standing policy of encouraging well-researched papers by non-professional historians. Its early editions have many articles by Victorian pioneers who had first-hand experience of the events they describe from the formation of the colony and later state of Victoria.

The early editions of the journal up to 1954 have been digitised and can be found on the State Library of Victoria's website.

Past editors have included Judith Smart (RMIT), Richard Broome (La Trobe University), and Andrew Lemon.
