= Concetta Benn =

Australian social worker

Concetta Benn AM
- Born: 12 December 1926; Melbourne, Victoria, Australia
- Died: 18 March 2011 (aged 84)
- Education: Mac.Robertson Girls' High School; University of Melbourne
- Occupation: Social worker
- Awards: Victorian Honour Roll of Women

Concetta "Connie" Benn AM (née Megna; 12 December 1926 – 18 March 2011) was an Australian social worker. Born in Melbourne to a family of Italian migrants, Benn is best known for her work with the Brotherhood of St Laurence and created a new theory of social work called developmental approach. She was the first Research Officer for the Leader of the Opposition in the state of Victoria where she helped bring in amendments to the state's Social Welfare Act. In her retirement she accepted positions for various organisations. Benn was made a Member of the Order of Australia in 1995, and was added to the Victorian Honour Roll of Women seven years later.

== Early life ==
Benn was born in Melbourne on 12 December 1926. She was the daughter of Maddalena (née Paino) and Antonio Megna. Megna immigrated from the Italian island of Lipari before the outbreak of the First World War but was required to return and joined the Italian Army. After a few years, he went back to Australia, and started a successful chain of fruit and vegetable shops. Benn was educated at Mac.Robertson Girls' High School where like many migrant families of the era, she was given a hard time which she would later display in her working life; she later graduated with a Bachelor of Arts degree and a diploma in journalism at the University of Melbourne in 1949. In the same year she married medical student Keith Benn, and moved around for the next six years because he was qualifying as a psychiatrist. They had three children.

She had become interested in social work, and her husband suggested she return to the University of Melbourne where she studied a partial degree in arts and a near complete degree in psychology. Benn visited the university's arts faculty and spoke with the person responsible who told her she could continue with psychology or she could study social work. Benn elected to study social work as she did not wish to test people, and after a formal interview, was found to be suitable for the course. She graduated in 1957.

== Career ==
She obtained her first job at the Larundel Hospital's Mental Hygiene Department where she worked until her husband was transferred to Royal Park and later Mont Park. Benn later left Mont Park and found employment at her local Citizens' Welfare Service as their Director of Social Work and Research where she remained for five years during which she began marriage and adolescent counselling. Benn participated on a weekly television panel where she advised people. She left as she felt she wanted to work in academia, and worked on a master's degree which was uncompleted. Benn found a job at the Parliament of Victoria where she worked as the first Research Officer for the state's Leader of the Opposition. She performed a large amount of research into the discovery of gas in the Bass Strait, and assisted in bring about 99 amendments to the Social Welfare Act, by working and making suggestions to the Government of Victoria.

Benn applied for a job with the national Australian Government whilst she was still working in the Victoria Parliament which was accepted 18 months later. She held it for two days until the Prime Minister John Gorton announced the position would be eliminated. Benn started working for the Brotherhood of St Laurence in 1971, for a small job with the Australian Council of Trade Unions (ACTU) who were needing to find residence for families and dealt with cases relating to work wages. Whilst at the project Benn decided their work into Social Work service was not producing the ideal result, which resulted in ACTU later electing to close their facility. ACTU employed her for six months during which she founded St Laurence's Family Centre project. It was a three-year experimental plan, and she used a professional criteria to select 60 families, of which at least 40 used it by 1973. Other families that were unable to join were referred to welfare agencies.

She developed a new theory of social work called developmental approach which she believed would bring about sustainable change, and attracted young people from other disciplines who would later influence community organisations around Victoria. She left the project in 1975 and was succeeded by Hayden Raysmith because she felt casework was not an effective method of changing people's lives. Benn was the brotherhood's director of social policy and research between 1975 and 1982 which placed a strong focus on dealing with unemployment and single parents. In her post she recommended that ombudsmen allow themselves to be more available to people on low-incomes, and allow information to be more freely available in the media. Benn left to become the Head of School at the Phillip Institute of Technology but found it difficult to teach and spent a large amount of time in administrative work. Benn was contacted by Mary Draper for the position of the Director of Social Development under the Victorian Labor government of John Cain which she accepted. In her position she convinced other social workers to move out of traditional casework, and speak out on extensive problems regarding issues within their respective communities.

Benn also assisted in the establishment of the Victorian Women's Trust. In 1985 she was promoted to the position of deputy director-general of Community Services Victoria. Benn later left as she felt the Victoria cabinet had not done enough to be more directly involved with its citizens. The Vice-Chancellor of the University of Melbourne David Penington asked if she wanted to become the university's new professor in their Social Work Department where she employed new community development and policy individuals. She left due to being at retiring age. In retirement she accepted the position of president of the Australian Association of Social Workers, she was a board member for the Australian Broadcasting Corporation, vice-president of Co-As-It, the president of the Victoria Court Network, the chairwoman of the Adult Community and Further Education Board, and was the North Western Hospital Board's chairperson. She died on 18 March 2011 after a health decline that began when her husband died.

== Awards ==
Benn was awarded honorary doctorates from University of Melbourne and RMIT University, and was made a Member of the Order of Australia in 1995. Eight years later she was bestowed with the Centenary Medal. Benn was added to the Victorian Honour Roll of Women in 2002.
