= Royal Historical Society of Victoria =

Australian historical society

The Royal Historical Society of Victoria is a community organisation promoting the history of the state of Victoria, Australia. It functions to promote and research the history of that state after settlement, and as an umbrella organisation for more than 300 affiliated societies. It is operated by volunteers, and has a claimed membership of 1200.

The society was founded in 1909 and celebrated its centenary in 2009. It is responsible for the biannual Victorian Historical Journal and other publications. Exhibitions, community or government advisory functions and lectures are also its primary activities, and it has research facilities for members and the community. The society administers the Victorian Community History Awards in partnership with Public Record Office Victoria, and is a constituent member of the Federation of Australian Historical Societies.

== Publications ==
- History News, ISSN 1326-2696 Six issues per year. This can be downloaded from the RHSV website.
- Victorian Historical Journal, ISSN 1030-7710 Two issues per year.
- The Push from the Bush: A Bulletin of Social History, 1978–1988 (26 editions)
- The Push, 1989–1992 (4 editions)

== Fellows ==
Fellows of the Royal Historical Society of Victoria include

- Marnie Bassett
- Weston Bate
- Geoffrey Blainey
- Richard Broome
- Noel Fulford Learmonth
- Ian McLaren
- Joyce Nicholson
- Gary Presland
- Marjorie Tipping
- Geoffrey Serle
- A. G. L. Shaw

A Fellow of the RHSV is entitled to use the post nominal letters FRHSV.

== See also ==
- List of Australian organisations with royal patronage
