= Louis Hartz =

American political scientist, historian and professor (1919–1986)

- Born: April 8, 1919; Youngstown, Ohio, U.S.
- Died: January 20, 1986 (aged 66); Istanbul, Turkey
- Occupations: Political science and historian

Academic background
- Education: Harvard University (BA and PhD

Academic work
- Discipline: Political science, history
- Sub-discipline: Politics of the United States
- Institutions: Harvard University
- Notable works: The Liberal Tradition in America (1955); The Founding of New Societies(1964)

Louis Hartz (April 8, 1919 – January 20, 1986) was an American political scientist, historian, and a professor at Harvard University, where he taught from 1942 until 1974. Hartz's teaching and various writings—books and articles—have had an important influence on American political theory and comparative history.

== Early life and education ==
Hartz was born in Youngstown, Ohio, on April 8, 1919, the son of Russian Jewish immigrants. He grew up in Omaha, Nebraska, where he attended Technical High School in Omaha. He attended Harvard University, financed partly by a scholarship from the Omaha World-Herald, and graduated in 1940. He then spent a year traveling abroad on a fellowship. In 1942, Harts returned to Harvard, where he became a teaching fellow and earned his doctorate in 1946.

== Career ==
In 1956, Hartz became a full professor of government at Harvard University, where he was known as a talented and charismatic professor.

=== The Liberal Tradition in America ===
In 1955, Hartz authored and published his classic book The Liberal Tradition in America, in which he sought to explain the absence of ideologies in U.S. history. Hartz argued that American politics is guided by an enduring and underlying Lockean liberal consensus, which has shaped and narrowed the landscape of possibilities for U.S. political thought and behavior. Hartz attributed this triumph of the liberal worldview in the United States to the lack of a feudal past, which accounts for the absence of a struggle to overcome a conservative internal order, its vast resources and open space, and its liberal values introduced by its original settlers, who represented a narrow middle class component of European society.

Hartz also explained the rejection of socialism in the United States, which he attributed to Americans' widespread and generally consensual acceptance of classic liberalism and served as the major barrier to socialism in the nation.

=== The Founding of New Societies ===
Hartz edited and wrote substantial sections of The Founding of New Societies, published in 1964, in which he developed and expanded upon his “fragment thesis.” Hartz developed this thesis from the idea that those nations which originated as settler colonies are “fragments” of the original European nation that founded them. Hartz called them fragments because these colonies, in a sense, froze the class structure and underlying ideology prevalent in the mother country at the time of their foundation and did not experience the further evolution experienced in Europe. He considered Latin America and French Canada to be fragments of feudal Europe; the United States, English Canada, and Dutch South Africa to be liberal fragments; and Australia and English South Africa to be "radical" fragments (incorporating the nonsocialist working class radicalism of Britain in the early 19th century).

=== Later years and death ===
Hartz led a normal life until a sudden and unexplained emotional disturbance changed his entire personality in 1971. He refused all medical help. He divorced in 1972, rejected all his friends, and feuded intensely with Harvard students, faculty, and administrators. In 1974, he resigned, but he continued to use his scholarly skills and pursue his interests. Hartz spent his final years in London, New Delhi, New York City, and then Istanbul, where he died of an epileptic seizure in January 1986.

== Legacy ==
In 1956, the American Political Science Association awarded Hartz the Woodrow Wilson Prize for The Liberal Tradition in America. In 1977, he was awarded the association's Lippincott Prize, which honors scholarly works of enduring importance. The book remains a key text in graduate-level curricula in political science and is considered one of the most extensive overviews of the influence of the liberal tradition on American politics.

In Canada, Hartz's fragment thesis was disseminated and expanded on by Gad Horowitz, in Horowitz's essay, "Conservatism, Liberalism and Socialism in Canada: An Interpretation", published in 1966. Horowitz's use and interpretation of Hartz has been influential in Canadian political theory and remains actively debated in the 21st century.

In Australia, Hartz's fragment thesis "received respectful attention, but … did not win assent or committed followers", according to historian John Hirst. It was applied to early colonial history by feminist historian Miriam Dixson in The Real Matilda (1976), in which she traced gender relations in colonial New South Wales to the culture of the proletarian fragment identified by Hartz. In 1973, the Australian Economic History Review dedicated an issue to analysis of Hartz's theory.

== Bibliography ==
=== Books ===
- Economic Policy and Democratic Thought: Pennsylvania 1776-1860. 1948. Harvard University Press.
- The Liberal Tradition in America: An Interpretation of American Political Thought since the Revolution. 1955. Harcourt, Brace.
- The Founding of New Societies: Studies in the History of the United States, Latin America, South Africa, Canada, and Australia. 1964. Harcourt, Brace & World. (edited). OCLC 254767
- A Synthesis of World History, (Zurich, 1984).
- The Necessity of Choice: Nineteenth-Century Political Thought. Edited with an introduction by Paul Roazen. 1990. Transaction Publishers. ISBN 978-0-88738-326-7

=== Selected articles ===
- “John M. Harlan in Kentucky, 1855–1877”. Filson Club History Quarterly. 14 (1), January 1940. Archived from the original on May 2, 2012. Retrieved November 30, 2011.
- “Otis and Anti-Slavery Doctrine.” 1939. The New England Quarterly 12(4): 745–747.
- “Seth Luther: The Story of a Working-Class Rebel.” 1940. New England Quarterly 13(3): 401–418.
- “Goals for Political Science: A Discussion.” 1951. American Political Science Review 45(4): 1001–1005.
- “American Political Thought and the American Revolution.” 1952. American Political Science Review 46(2): 321–342.
- “The Reactionary Enlightenment: Southern Political Thought before the Civil War.” 1952. Western Political Quarterly 5(1): 31–50.
- “The Whig Tradition in America and Europe.” 1952. American Political Science Review 46(4): 989–1002.
- “The Coming of Age of America.” 1957. American Political Science Review 51(2): 474–483.
- “Conflicts within the Idea of the Liberal Tradition.” 1963. Comparative Studies in Society and History 5(3): 279–284.
- “American Historiography and Comparative Analysis: Further Reflections.” 1963. Comparative Studies in Society and History 5(4): 365–377.
- “The Nature of Revolution.” 2005 [1968]. Society 42(4): 54–61.

== Sources ==
- Barber, Benjamin. 1986. “Louis Hartz.” Political Theory 14(3): 355–358.
- Margolick, David (January 24, 1986). "Louis Hartz of Harvard Dies: Ex-Professor of Government". The New York Times. p. 17.
