= Aboriginal Australians (book) =

Non-fiction book on about Indigenous Australian history

- Author: Richard Broome
- Language: English
- Subject: Indigenous Australians
- Genre: Non-fiction
- Publisher: Allen & Unwin
- Publication date: 1982 (1st edition); 1994 (2nd edition); September 1, 2002 (3rd edition); May 1, 2010 (4th edition); 5 November 2019 (5th edition)
- Pages: 436 (5th editions)
- ISBN: 978-1-760-52821-8

Aboriginal Australians: A History Since 1788 is a book first published in 1982 by Richard Broome about Indigenous Australians.

== Background ==
Richard Broome had begun teaching at La Trobe University in 1977 where he took over a course on the history of Aboriginal Australians previously taught by John Hurst. Allen & Unwin then asked Broome if he would write a general book on the subject. Though Broome is not Indigenous himself, and described himself as "a white historian, a gubbo, as local crews would call me", he agreed to write it based on the materials he had been using in his class.

He noted many of the sources used were written by non-Indigenous people so it was not easy to write his book from an Indigenous perspective.

== Publication history ==
The book was first published in 1982 as Aboriginal Australians: Black Responses to White Dominance, 1788–1980. It was part of the series The Australian Experience edited by Heather Radi.

A second edition was published in 1994 which added a chapter looking at events post-1980. It sold over 50,000 copies by the time of its forth edition in 2010.

For its fourth edition, the book was completely rewritten and the title was changed to Aboriginal Australians : A History Since 1788.

== Reception ==
In Labour History, Peter Read wrote of the first edition, "The work suffers from being rather too political. Three chapters of 11 deal mostly with events after the Second World War. Since two more deal with the traditional life and events in Sydney before 1830, the result is a book which is heavy at both ends, but thin in the middle." Read praised Broome's sensitivity in how he presented Indigenous history, though noted early sections felt incomplete, possibly due to a lack of information available to the author.

In Aboriginal History, S. G. Foster praised Broome's use of sources that otherwise might be unavailable to a wider number of readers. Foster wrote, "The best parts of the book deal with the last hundred years or so. Broome is less confident on the earlier period, and less accurate...But this is not a criticism: in a field expanding as quickly as Aboriginal history, any author of a general book must expect to be partially out of date by the time his or her work is published, let alone reviewed. Certainly Broome's book is good enough to warrant before too long a revised edition."

Regarding the books second edition, Geoffrey Grey wrote in The Australian Journal of Indigenous Education that while the book billed itself as the "only concise and up-to-date survey of Aboriginal history since 1788", it was in fact a white history of "relations between Aborigines and the State (in its various guises) since 1788". Grey criticised the idea that the book was up-to-date when it had not been rewritten, and earlier chapters remained intact from previous editions and ignored more recent research.

For the fourth edition, Rani Kerin praised the fact that it had been rewritten as previous editions had become dated. Though they questioned Broome's writing on assimilation, they felt the rest of the book was strong and recommended it. Micheal Connor wrote, that in the fourth edition Broome had made changes to the narrative based on criticism over previous editions, though he noted Broome introduced new errors. Connor further questioned some of the changes to the new edition which removed previous sections without explanation and made use of bad sources.

A book Conflict, adaptation, transformation: Richard Broome and the practice of Aboriginal history, edited by Ben Silverstein, was published by the Australian Institute of Aboriginal and Torres Strait Islander Studies' Aboriginal Studies Press in 2018. It included essays reflecting on Broome's work and Indigenous Australian history more broadly.
