= Joy Damousi =

Australian historian

Joy Damousi AM, FASSA, FAHA, FBA
- Born: 1961 (age 64–65); Melbourne, Victoria, Australia
- Parent(s): George; Sophia
- Awards: Fellow of the Academy of the Social Sciences in Australia (2004); Fellow of the Australian Academy of the Humanities (2004); Ernest Scott Prize (2006); Kathleen Fitzpatrick Fellowship (2014); Member of the Order of Australia (2022)

Academic background
- Education: La Trobe University (BA [Hons]); Australian National University (PhD)
- Thesis: Socialist women in Australia, c.1890 – c.1918 (1987)

Academic work
- Discipline: Australian history
- Institutions: University of Melbourne; Australian Catholic University
- Notable works: Freud in the Antipodes: A Cultural History of Psychoanalysis in Australia (2005)

Joy Damousi, AM, FASSA, FAHA, FBA (born 1961) is an Australian historian and Dean of Arts, Professor and Director of the Institute for Humanities and Social Sciences at Australian Catholic University. She was Professor of History in the School of Historical and Philosophical Studies at the University of Melbourne for most of her career, and retains a fractional appointment. She was the President of the Australian Academy of the Humanities from 2017 to 2020.

== Early life and education ==
Damousi was born in Melbourne, Victoria. Her parents George and Sophia migrated to Australia from Greece in 1956 and 1957 respectively. Damousi graduated from La Trobe University where she completed her Bachelor of Arts (with Honours) and the Australian National University where she graduated with a Doctor of Philosophy in 1987.

== Academic career ==
Damousi held contract positions at Monash University (1988–1990), La Trobe University (1991), and the University of Melbourne (1992–1995) where she accepted a tenured position in 1996. She was appointed as Professor of History in 2004 and held positions of leadership within the University of Melbourne, including Associate Dean Research in the Faculty of Arts, Pro Vice Chancellor Research and also as the inaugural Head of the School of Historical Studies.

Damousi was appointed as a Research Evaluation Committee Chair for the Humanities and Creative Arts disciplines as part the Excellence in Research for Australia (ERA) initiative of the Australian Research Council for 2012. On 18 November 2017, she was elected as President of the Australian Academy of the Humanities. From 2014 to 2015, she was also a member of the ARC Research Evaluation Committee Humanities and creative arts.

As part of the Kathleen Fitzpatrick Laureate Fellowship in the 2000s, Damousi managed a related fellowship mentoring scheme. This scheme involved mentoring, training and workshops aimed to develop the careers of early career female researchers at the PhD level.

== Other work ==
In 2003, Damousi was chief editor of the leading historical journal Australian Historical Studies, while Patricia Grimshaw was president of the editorial board.

== Awards and honours ==
Damousi's book Freud in the Antipodes: A Cultural History of Psychoanalysis in Australia (2005, UNSW Press) was awarded the Ernest Scott Prize for the most distinguished contribution to the history of Australia or New Zealand or to the history of colonisation in 2006. Other books by Damousi have been shortlisted for prizes. Colonial Voices: A Cultural History of English in Australia, 1840–1940 (Cambridge 2010) was short-listed for the New South Wales Premier's History Awards, Australian History Prize in 2011.

Damousi was elected as a Fellow of both the Academy of the Social Sciences in Australia and the Australian Academy of Humanities in 2004. She was the 2015 Fred Alexander Fellow in History at the University of Western Australia, and is a holder of the Kathleen Fitzpatrick Fellowship for "outstanding female researchers in humanities, arts and social sciences".

In 2014, Damousi was awarded the Australian Research Council Kathleen Fitzpatrick Australian Laureate Fellowship for her research leadership and scholarly excellence.

Damousi was appointed a Member of the Order of Australia in the 2022 Queen's Birthday Honours in recognition of her "significant service to social sciences and the humanities, to history, and to tertiary education. She was elected an International Fellow of the British Academy in 2026.

== Publications ==
=== Monographs ===
- Women come rally: socialism, communism and gender in Australia 1890–1955 (Oxford University Press, 1994)
- Depraved and disorderly: female convicts, sexuality and gender in colonial Australia (Cambridge University Press, 1997)
- The Labour of Loss: Mourning, Memory and Wartime Bereavement in Australia (Cambridge University Press, 1999)
- Living with the aftermath: trauma, nostalgia and grief in post-war Australia (Cambridge University Press, 2001)
- Freud in the Antipodes: A Cultural History of Psychoanalysis in Australia (UNSW Press 2005)
- Colonial Voices: A Cultural History of English in Australia, 1840–1940 (Cambridge 2010)
- Memory and Migration in the Shadow of War: Australia's Greek Immigrants after World War II and the Greek Civil War (Cambridge University Press, 2015)
- The Humanitarians: Child War Refugees and Australian Humanitarianism in a Transnational World, 1919-1975 (Cambridge University Press, 2022)

=== Co-authored monographs ===
- with John Cash Footy Passions (University of New South Wales Press, 2009)
- with Marilyn Lake, Mark McKenna and Henry Reynolds What's Wrong with ANZAC? (University of New South Wales Press, 2010)
- with Birgit Lang and Alison Lewis A history of the case study: sexology, psychoanalysis, literature (Manchester University Press, 2017)

=== Edited collections ===
- with Marilyn Lake Gender and war: Australians at war in the twentieth century (Cambridge University Press, 1995)
- with Katherine Ellinghaus Citizenship, women and social justice: international historic perspectives (Department of History University of Melbourne, 1999)
- with Robert Reynolds History on the Couch: Essays in History and Psychoanalysis (Melbourne University Press, 2003)
- with Desley Deacon Talking and Listening in the Age of Modernity: Essays on the History of Sound (ANU Press, 2007)
- with MB Plotkin Psychoanalysis and Politics: Histories of Psychoanalysis Under Conditions of Restricted Political Freedom (Oxford University Press, 2012)
- with Kim Rubenstein and Mary Tomsic Diversity in Leadership (ANU Press, 2014)
- with Ann Curthoys What Did You Do in the Cold War Daddy? Personal Stories from a Troubled Time (UNSW Press, 2014)
- with Katie Sutton and Birgit Lang Case studies and the dissemination of knowledge (Routledge, 2015)
- with Paula Hamilton A cultural history of sound, memory, and the senses (Routledge, 2016)
- with Robin Archer, Sean Scalmer and Murray Goot The Conscription Conflict and the Great War (Monash University Publishing, 2016)
- with Judith Smart Contesting Australian History: Essays in Honour of Marilyn Lake (Monash University Publishing, 2019)
