= Renate Howe =

Australian historian

Renate Thelma Howe AM (born 1939) is an Australian academic and historian. Her research and writing focuses on Australian social, urban and religious history.

Howe was born in Melbourne, Victoria in 1939. She was educated at East Kew State School and University High School, matriculating in 1956. Her tertiary education included a BA from the University of Melbourne and further studies at University of Chicago. During her student years, she was active in the Student Christian Movement and the ALP Club. She also spent two years on the Students' Representative Council. She was awarded a PhD in 1972.

Howe tutored at the University of Melbourne from 1969 to 1974. In 1977 she was appointed to the team to set up distance education at Deakin University where she remained for most of her career. She was a three-time board member of the Deakin University, 1982–1983, 1994–1996 and 1998–2000. On her retirement in 2005, she was appointed honorary associate professor in the Faculty of Arts and Education at Deakin University.

In the 2012 Australia Day Honours, Howe was appointed Member of the Order of Australia (AM) for "service to higher education and to the arts through administrative and academic roles, and to the community, particularly through heritage and cultural organisations".

== Works ==
- Slums and Suburbs: Social history of urbanization, Oxford University Press, 1982 ISBN 019554305X
- New Houses for Old: Fifty years of public housing in Victoria 1938-1988, Ministry of Housing and Construction, 1988, ISBN 0724147977
- All God's Children: A centenary history of the Methodist Homes for Children and the Orana Peace Memorial Homes, co-authored by Shurlee Swain, Acorn Press, 1989 ISBN 0908284977
- Single Mothers and Their Children: Disposal, punishment and survival in Australia, co-authored by Shurlee Swain, Cambridge University Press, 1995 ISBN 0521479681
- A Century of Influence: The Australian Student Christian Movement 1896–1996, University of New South Wales Press, 2009 ISBN 9781921410956
- Trendyville: The battle for Australia's inner cities, co-authored by David Nicholas and Graeme Davison, Monash University Publishing, 2014 ISBN 9781921867422

== Personal ==
Howe married Brian Howe in 1962. They had three children.
