= Murder of Sheree Beasley =

Murder of young Australian girl

Sheree Beasley
- Sheree Beasley in her school uniform
- Born: Sheree Joy Beasley; 25 February 1985
- Died: 29 June 1991 (aged 6)
- Cause of death: Homicide by asphyxia
- Body discovered: Red Hill, Victoria, Australia
- Resting place: Mornington Cemetery, Mount Martha, Victoria, Australia
- Known for: Murder victim
- Mother: Kerri Greenhill

Sheree Joy Beasley (25 February 1985 – 29 June 1991) was an Australian schoolgirl from Rosebud, an outer suburb of Melbourne, Victoria.

Beasley was kidnapped, raped and murdered by Robert Arthur Selby Lowe in June 1991. Her body was found three months later, in an advanced state of decomposition, on 24 September 1991 in a stormwater drain.

One of the leading items that led to Lowe's incarceration was based on patient care sessions that were recorded by police investigators and later by his psychotherapist.

On the 24th anniversary of her murder, a memorial service was held at her grave, which many members of the community attended.

== Murder ==
Beasley rode her bicycle to a nearby milk bar, where she was abducted by Robert Lowe, a Sunday school teacher, church elder and travelling salesman.

Lowe had apparently targeted Beasley because he had seen her alone on several previous occasions. A possible explanation for the lack of supervision was that Beasley had been transferred several times between the custody of her mother and the custody of her maternal and paternal grandparents.

After the abduction, several witnesses said that they had seen a middle-aged man driving a blue car containing a "distressed child".

Lowe had a history of crimes involving children. Before Beasley's murder, he had had multiple offences for indecent exposure, which had been aimed at young girls.

Months after the murder, he was seeing a psychotherapist because he was having marital problems. His therapist, Margaret Hobbs, eventually began to suspect that he was involved in the murder of Beasley. Lowe had given suspicious statements, saying that he did not remember where he was on the day Beasley died and that he felt police were closing in on him.

The police had interviewed Lowe after the abduction, and they later tape-recorded some of his sessions with Hobbs (initially without her knowledge). After being informed of the recording, Hobbs gave her permission for more taping, as she was disturbed by Lowe's statements.

== Trial and conviction ==
Those representing Lowe during his trial objected to the manner in which recorded evidence was obtained from his therapy sessions with Hobbs. They asserted that the recordings were a violation of a confidentiality policy. The court dismissed this and came to the consensus that the evidence was appropriate for the protection of the public.

Hobbs stated that Lowe had discussed several suspicious details related to Beasley's murder. Such statements were concerned with a desire to "build an alibi" and with the consequences of pleading guilty to manslaughter. Lowe eventually stated in April 1992 that he had given Beasley a ride in his car and had manually strangled her. During his trial, he admitted his guilt. He said that he had "choked the girl". Lowe was subsequently convicted of kidnapping and murder, and was sentenced to life imprisonment plus 15 years without parole.

== Aftermath ==
After Lowe was sent to prison for murdering Beasley, he stated that he was innocent. In August 2014, he wrote that he believed law enforcement was using him as a scapegoat because of their failure to find those who were responsible for the crime. The police and the family of the victim did not believe this, and said they were "sickened" by his assertions.

After Lowe's conviction, his psychotherapist Margaret Hobbs began writing a book based on her experience. She died in a vehicle accident in 1996; her book was later completed and published by Andrew Rule.

Lowe is believed to have been involved with a large amount of child pornography that had been smuggled into the prison in which he was incarcerated. It is believed that persons who were visiting inmates were the source of this material.

He died on 4 November 2021.

== See also ==
- List of kidnappings
- List of solved missing person cases

== Bibliography ==
- Miller, Wayne Charles, The Murder of Sheree Beasley, Wilkinson Books, 1996, ISBN 186350219X
