= Sandy Jeffs =

Australian author and mental health advocate (born 1953)

- Born: 1953 (age 72–73); Ballarat, Victoria, Australia
- Education: La Trobe University
- Occupations: Author, poet, advocate

Sandy Jeffs (born 1953) is an Australian author, poet, and mental health advocate. She is known for advocating for people living with schizophrenia.

== Early life and education ==
Jeffs grew up in Ballarat, Victoria. She enrolled at La Trobe University, where she studied history.

In 1976, shortly after graduating from university, Jeffs was diagnosed with schizophrenia at the age of 23. She was unable to get a job, and was admitted to a mental hospital in Melbourne.

== Career ==
In 1993, Spinifex Press published Jeffs' first book, Poems from the Madhouse.

In 2009, Spinifex published Jeffs' memoir, Flying with Paper Wings: Reflections on Living With Madness.

In 2018, Jeffs was one of the featured guests in an episode of You Can't Ask That on people with schizophrenia.

Jeffs has served as a Peer Ambassador for the Australian mental health organization SANE, and as a member of the Board of Management of the Schizophrenia Association of Victoria.

== Selected publications ==
- Poems from the Madhouse. Spinifex Press. 1993. ISBN 9781742191485.
- "The Experience of Schizophrenia". Australian and New Zealand Journal of Psychiatry. 31 (6). December 1997. doi:10.3109/00048679709065506.
- Loose Kangaroos: A Collection of New Australian Poetry. Spinifex Press. 1998. ISBN 9780958539463. (with Geoff Prince, Michael Crane, and Dee)
- Flying with Paper Wings: Reflections on Living with Madness. Spinifex Press. 2009. ISBN 9781925950953.
- The Mad Poet's Tea Party. Spinifex Press. 2015. ISBN 9781742199467.
- Chiaroscuro. Black Pepper Publishing. 2015. ISBN 9781876044817.
- Out of the Madhouse: From Asylums to Caring Community?. Australian Scholarly Publishing. 2020. ISBN 9781925984262. (with Margaret Leggatt)
- The Poetics of a Plague, A Haiku Diary. Spinifex Press. 2021. ISBN 9781925950373.

== Awards and recognition ==
- Medal of the Order of Australia (OAM)
- Victorian Honour Roll of Women
- Victorian Community History Awards, Oral History Award (Out of the Madhouse)
- Second prize, Anne Elder Award (Poems from the Madhouse)
- SANE Book of the Year Award (Flying with Paper Wings)
- Commendations, Australian Human Rights Awards (Flying with Paper Wings, Poems from the Madhouse)
