= Donald Chambers (author) =

Australian historian and writer (1935–2015)

Donald Chambers (12 July 1935 – 11 October 2011) was an author, historian and heritage advocate in Victoria, Australia. He was responsible for writing 11 books, on subjects including cemeteries and timber bridges.

== Early life and education ==
Chambers was born on 12 July 1935 at Lilydale Bush Nursing hospital, on the eastern fringes of Melbourne, Victoria, to Alan and Hazel Chambers and spent his early years in the outer Melbourne suburb of Croydon, then moved to Euroa and Kelvin View. He was educated at Euroa State School, Kelvin View Primary School, Euroa Higher Elementary School to fifth form, then the last year available at the school, and completed his Leaving Certificate as a correspondence student.

After leaving school he worked at the Avenel Estate of Tehan brothers and on his Uncle Harold Godden's Violet Town farm. Don undertook National Service at Puckapunyal Army Camp, learning to operate General Grant Tanks; then travelled to northern Queensland, shearing sheep. Returning to Violet Town he became a member of the local Presbyterian Fellowship Association, and joined the Violet Town Presbyterian Church and football team.

He became interested in further academic study, and in 1960 he moved to Melbourne to complete his matriculation studies with Taylor's Correspondence School. He entered University of Melbourne in 1961 residing at Ormond College in Parkville. in his undergraduate degree he studied History and Philosophy and achieved the History prize in his 4th year (1964). After completing his MA degree on the history of Ormond College in 1966, Don won a Commonwealth Scholarship to undertake a degree at Cambridge University beginning in September 1966 and was a member of Selwyn College.

In 1969 Don began PhD studies on Scottish Church History. He had a strong interest in the origin and nature of the ideas people brought with them to Victoria in the 19th Century. By studying the disruption of the Scottish church in the 1840s he was able to better understand the positions taken by many of these immigrants to Victoria.

== Work and community activity ==
In 1972 Dr Chambers returned to Victoria and held teaching positions in the History Departments at Monash University and La Trobe University, specialising in courses about British and Australian History.

Don began research on a history of Violet Town in 1981. The book was published by Melbourne University Press and launched by Geoff Serle in 1985. He continued to write commissioned histories - 11 books in total. He had a number of contracts with the Australian Funeral Directors and over the next ten years wrote several histories including histories of the Melbourne General Cemetery, Springvale Cemetery and Fawkner Cemetery. In addition, he wrote a history of Hailebury College and chapters in Essays of Ormond College.

Don was instrumental in the production of writing the book Carlton: A History edited by Peter Yule. Don also wrote biographies of a scouting leader (Boss Hurst), and Frank Hackett-Jones, and a major work on Wooden Wonders - Victorian Timber Bridges for the National Trust of Victoria. Some of these books were awarded Victorian Community History and Engineering History prizes.

Don married Sue Howlett in 1966 and the couple had two children, Zoe (b. 1971) and Jonathan (b. 1976).

== Awards ==
- Victorian Community History Award 2004: for Melbourne General Cemetery
- Victorian Community History Awards 2007, Commendation, Best Collaborative / Community Work

== Selected publications ==
- 'Chambers, Don (Donald) (1985), Violet Town or Honeysuckle in Australia Felix 1836-1908, Melbourne University Press, ISBN 0-522-84301-8
- 'Chambers, Don (Donald); National Trust of Australia (Victoria); Roads Corporation (Vic.); Victorian Association of Forest Industries; Heritage Victoria (2006), Wooden wonders : Victoria's timber bridges, Hyland House, ISBN 978-1-86447-100-7
- Chambers, Don (Donald) (2001), City of the dead : a history of the Necropolis, Springvale, Hyland House, ISBN 978-1-86447-020-8
- Chambers, Don (Donald) (2003), The Melbourne General Cemetery, Hyland House, ISBN 978-1-86447-057-4
- Carlton: A History, edited by Peter Yule
