= Office for Women =

Agency of the Australian Government

The Office for Women, formerly the Office of Women's Affairs and then Office of the Status of Women, is an office within the Australian Government focused on Gender inequality in Australia.

== History ==
In March 1983, the Office of Women's Affairs changed its name to the Office of the Status of Women. Susan Ryan was the first federal Australian Labor Party (ALP) female minister, appointed as Minister for Education and Youth Affairs and Minister assisting the Prime Minister for the Status of Women in Bob Hawke's first ministry in 1983.

Ryan wrote after Hawke's death in 2019:

As the first (and only) woman in a federal Labor cabinet, I lost quite a few battles and budget bids, and endured some tough treatment. But I never lost a debate in cabinet because of sexism or misogyny. Bob never dealt with me or my proposals through a derogatory gender lens, and he set the tone

Anne Summers was appointed to run the Office of the Status of Women in December 1983, a position she occupied for about three years. Significant reforms in these years that benefited women included the Sex Discrimination Act 1984, the Affirmative Action (Equal Opportunity for Women in Employment) Act 1986, and a major increase in spending on childcare.

On 26 October 2004, under the Liberal–National Coalition (LNP) government of Prime Minister John Howard, the Office was transferred from the Department of the Prime Minister and Cabinet to the Department of Family and Community Services, changing its name to the Office for Women.

In 2013, under LNP Prime Minister Tony Abbott, a number of federal government departments were restructured, including the Department of the Prime Minister and Cabinet which took responsibility for the Office for Women.

== Description ==
As of March 2025, the function of the Office for Women is "to advance the Government's commitment to achieve gender equality and improve the lives of people in Australia".

As of March 2025, Padma Raman is executive director of the Office for Women.

== Reports ==
In December 2017, the Office for Women released the report "Gender Balance on Australian Government Boards Report 2016-17", to show "the Government's performance against its gender diversity target on Australian Government boards".

The report found that:

On 1 July 2016, the Government set a target of women holding 50% of Australian Government board positions overall, and at least 40% representation of women and 40% representation of men on individual boards. As at 30 June 2017, women held 42.7% of Australian Government board positions. This is the highest outcome since public reporting on the gender balance of Government boards began in 2011. Statistics on new appointments made in 2016-17 show how individual portfolios have progressed towards meeting the target. Of the 729 new appointments made in 2016-17, 46.2% of appointees were women. For seven of the 18 government portfolios, women comprised over 50% of new board appointments during 2016-17.

== See also ==
- Sex Discrimination Commissioner (established 1984)
- Women in Australia
- Women and Gender Equality Canada formally known as Status of Women Canada
