= Judith Smart =

Australian social historian and feminist

Judith Smart AM
- Born: Judith Beryl Smart; 20 October 1950 (age 75); Melbourne, Victoria, Australia

Academic background
- Education: Monash University
- Thesis: War and the concept of a new social order: Melbourne 1914–1915 (1992)

Judith Smart AM (born 20 October 1950) is an Australian social historian and feminist.

== Early life and education ==
Born in Melbourne, Victoria on 20 October 1950, Smart completed her secondary education at Mac.Robertson Girls' High School. She graduated from Monash University with a BA (1971) and DipEd (1972). Returning to Monash she completed a PhD with the title "War and the concept of a new social order: Melbourne 1914–1915" in 1992.

== Career ==
On graduation, Smart spent 1973 teaching at Sandringham Technical School. The following year she joined Royal Melbourne Institute of Technology (now RMIT University), over the years rising to associate professor in 2003. Smart retired in 2005 but continued her association with RMIT University initially as adjunct professor and later honorary associate professor. From 2005 to 2015 she was a principal fellow in the Australian Centre at the University of Melbourne.

Smart served as editor of the Victorian Historical Journal from 2004 to 2009 and co-editor from 2017. She was a member of the council of the Royal Historical Society of Victoria from 2007 to 2017 and was elected a fellow in 2012. Smart has served on the executive committee of the History Council of Victoria since 2009, including as deputy chair from 2010 to 2019.

With Shurlee Swain, Smart is co-editor of the Encyclopedia of Women & Leadership in Twentieth-Century Australia. She has also been involved on the committee of Her Place Women's Museum.

Smart was appointed a Member of the Order of Australia in the 2020 Australia Day Honours for " significant service to education, to social research, and to women".

For the Australian Dictionary of Biography she was a member of the Victorian Working Party from 1979 and advised on women's entries from 1989. She has contributed a number of biographies, including women's activists Sarah Jane Baines, Elizabeth Couchman and Elizabeth Britomarte James.

== Works ==
- The Forgotten Fifties: Aspects of Australian society and culture in the 1950s, co-edited with John Murphy (1997)
- Consumer Australia: Historical Perspectives, co-edited with Robert Crawford and Kim Humphery (2011)
- Founders, Firsts and Feminists: Women Leaders in Twentieth-century Australia, co-edited with Fiona Davis and Nell Musgrove (2011)
- Respectable Radicals: A history of the National Council of Women Australia, 1896–2006, co-authored with Marian Quartly
- Remembering Melbourne 1850–1960, co-authored with Richard Broome, Richard Barnden, Don Garden, Don Gibb and Elisabeth Jackson (2016)
- From the Margins to the Mainstream: The Domestic Violence Services Movement in Victoria, Australia, 1974–2016, co-authored with Jacqui Theobald and Suellen Murray (2017)
- Contesting Australian History: Essays in Honour of Marilyn Lake, co-edited with Joy Damousi (2019)
