= David Lowe (historian) =

Australian biographer and historian

- Born: 11 November 1964 (age 61); Melbourne, Victoria
- Awards: Fellow of the Academy of the Social Sciences in Australia (2015)

Academic background
- Education: Monash University (BA [Hons]); University of Cambridge (PhD)

Academic work
- Institutions: Deakin University; University of London
- Main interests: Political and diplomatic history

David Michael Lowe (born 11 November 1964) is an Australian biographer and historian of modern international affairs, and of Australia's role therein, especially with reference to Asia and the Pacific.

== Early life and education ==
David Lowe was born on 11 November 1964. He completed undergraduate studies at Monash University in Australia, graduating with First Class Honours in 1987. Lowe was awarded his doctorate in 1991 from the University of Cambridge.

== Academic career ==
Lowe is the co-founder of the Australian Policy and History network, the Chair and founder of the Contemporary Histories Research Group and was an elected board member of the Australian Historical Studies journal in 2003. Lowe has previously been a member of the Australian Department of Foreign Affairs and Trade Editorial Advisory Board. From 2009-2014, Lowe was the Director of the Alfred Deakin Institute.

In 2015 he was elected a Fellow of the Academy of Social Sciences in Australia.

Lowe has been awarded several Australian Research Council grants and other public sector funding grants for research projects.

He has published scholarly articles in journals including the Journal of Contemporary History, The International Journal of Cultural Policy, The Australian Journal of Politics and History, and The Journal of Imperial and Commonwealth History. Lowe has also written articles for The Conversation.

In 2016, Lowe was interviewed for the television series Howard on Menzies.

Lowe is currently the Chair in Contemporary History at Deakin University in Victoria.

== Selected works ==
=== Books ===
- Carola Lentz and David Lowe, Remembering Independence, Routledge, Abingdon, United Kingdom, forthcoming 2017. ISBN 9781138905726
- David Lowe and Tony Joel, Remembering the Cold War: Global Contest and National Stories, Routledge, Abingdon United Kingdom, 2013. ISBN 9780415661546
- David Lowe, Percy Spender: Australian Between Empires, Pickering and Chatto, London, 2010. ISBN 9781848930001
- Joan Beaumont, Christopher Waters, David Lowe, with Garry Woodard, Ministers, Mandarins and Diplomats; Australian Foreign Policy Making, 1941–1969, Melbourne University Press, 2003. ISBN 9780522850475
- David Lowe, Menzies and 'the Great World Struggle': Australia's Cold War, 1948–54, UNSW Press, Sydney, 1999. ISBN 9780868405537
- Roy Hay, David Lowe and Don Gibb, with Bill Anderson, Breaking the Mould: Deakin University, the First Twenty-Five Years, Deakin University, Geelong, 2002. ISBN 9780730025481

=== Book series editorship ===
- Remembering the Modern World (with Tony Joel), Routledge, UK.

=== As editor ===
- Cassandra Atherton, David Lowe and Alyson Miller (eds), The Unfinished Atomic Bomb, Rowman and Littlefield, Lanham, MD, forthcoming 2017.
- David Lowe, David Lee, Carl Bridge (eds), Australia goes to Washington: A History of Australian Diplomatic Representation in the United States, Australian National University Press, Canberra, 2016. ISBN 9781760460785
- David Lowe and Amit Sarwal (eds) Enriched Relations: Public Diplomacy in Australian-Indian Relations, Readworthy, New Delhi, 2013. ISBN 9789350183489
- David Lowe (ed.), Australia and the End of Empires: The Impact of Decolonisation in Australia’s Near North, 1945–65, Deakin University Press, Geelong, 1996. ISBN 0949823589
- David Lowe (ed), Immigration and Integration: Australia and Britain, University of London, London, 1995.
