= Shurlee Swain =

Australian social welfare historian

Shurlee Swain AM, FASSA, FAHA
- Born: 1948 (age 77–78); Natimuk, Victoria
- Awards: Fellow of the Academy of the Social Sciences in Australia (2007); Fellow of the Australian Academy of the Humanities (2017); Member of the Order of Australia (2018)

Academic background
- Education: University of Melbourne
- Thesis: The Victorian Charity Network in the 1890s (1977)

Academic work
- Discipline: History
- Institutions: Deakin University; University of Melbourne; Australian Catholic University

Shurlee Lesley Swain, AM, FASSA, FAHA (born 1948) is an Australian social welfare historian, researcher and author. Since August 2017 she has been an Emeritus Professor at the Australian Catholic University (ACU).

== Early life and education ==
Swain was born in 1948 at Natimuk, Victoria. Her mother was a schoolteacher and her father a grocer. The family relocated to Ringwood in Melbourne in 1951, where she completed all her schooling. At the University of Melbourne she completed a Bachelor of Arts with Honours and Diploma of Social Work before completing her Doctor of Philosophy in 1977 on The Victorian Charity Network in the 1890s.

== Career ==
Swain's career as an academic began as a tutor in Australian Studies at Deakin University, before being appointed lecturer at her alma mater, the University of Melbourne, in the late 1980s. From there she moved to the Australian Catholic University (ACU) when it opened in 1991.

In 2011 Swain, together with Professor Cathy Humphreys and Associate Professor Gavan McCarthy, were appointed the three Chief Investigators in the Australia-wide Find and Connect Project — a project to provide history and information about Australian orphanages, children's homes and other institutions.

Outside her university commitments, for the Royal Commission into Institutional Responses to Child Sexual Abuse in 2014, Swain wrote three reports:

- "History of Child Protection Legislation"
- "History of Institutions providing Out-of-Home Residential Care for Children"
- "History of Australian inquiries reviewing institutions providing care for children"

Swain resigned from her position as Professor of Humanities in the School of Arts and Sciences at ACU in 2017 after ten years in that position. ACU celebrated her retirement by hosting a symposium and reception in her honour.

With Judith Smart, Swain is co-editor of the Encyclopedia of Women & Leadership in Twentieth-Century Australia.

== Awards and recognition ==
- Elected Fellow of the Academy of the Social Sciences in Australia (FASSA) in 2007
- Elected Fellow of the Australian Academy of the Humanities (FAHA) in 2017
- Appointed Member of the Order of Australia (AM) in the 2018 Queen's Birthday Honours for "significant service to education, particularly through comparative social history, as an academic, author, and researcher, and to the community".

== Selected works ==
=== As author ===
- Swain, Shurlee (1993). Constructing the good Christian woman. Uniting Church Historical Society, Synod of Victoria. ISBN 978-1-875749-13-3.
- Swain, Shurlee; Howe, Renate (1995). Single Mothers and Their Children : Disposal, Punishment and Survival in Australia. Cambridge University Press. ISBN 978-0-521-47443-6.
- Scott, Dorothy; Swain, Shurlee (2002). Confronting Cruelty : Historical Perspectives on Child Abuse. Melbourne University Press. ISBN 978-0-522-84998-1.
- Swain, Shurlee; Hillel, Margot (2010). Child, Nation, Race and Empire : Child Rescue Discourse, England, Canada and Australia, 1850-1915. Manchester University Press. ISBN 978-0-7190-7894-1.
- Swain, Shurlee (2012). Born in Hope : The Early Years of the Family Court of Australia (1st ed.). NewSouth Publishing. ISBN 978-1-74223-292-8.

=== As editor ===
- Swain, Shurlee; Swain, Phillip A, eds. (1992). To Search for Self : The Experience of Access to Adoption Information. Federation Press. ISBN 978-1-86287-087-1.
- May, Andrew; Swain, Shurlee, eds. (2005). The Encyclopedia of Melbourne. Cambridge University Press. ISBN 978-0-521-84234-1.
