= Victorian Women's Trust =

Australian philanthropic and advocacy organization

The Victorian Women's Trust (VWT) is an independent philanthropic and advocacy organization based in Victoria, Australia. Established in 1985, the Trust provides grants, conducts research, and engages in advocacy aimed at advancing gender equality and improving the status of women and girls.

== History ==
The Victorian Women's Trust was established in 1985 with a $1 million endowment from the Victorian State Government. This grant was provided to mark the 150th anniversary of the founding of the State of Victoria. Created as an independent, state-wide entity, it was the first organization of its kind in Australia.

== Operations and governance ==
The organization is registered with the Australian Charities and Not-for-profits Commission (ACNC) as a company limited by guarantee. Its primary charitable purpose is listed as advancing social or public welfare, with a specific focus on women and girls in the Victorian community.

The Trust is governed by a board of directors. Mary Crooks OA served as the executive director from 1996 until 2025. Following her departure from the organisation in 2025, a tribute by Professor Marilyn Lake acknowledged her role in initiating major projects such as the "Purple Sage" and "Kitchen Table Conversations" movements. Dr. Kirsten Abernethy was subsequently appointed as the executive director.

== Key initiatives ==
=== Victorian Honour Roll of Women ===
The Trust was instrumental in the creation of the Victorian Honour Roll of Women, established by the Victorian Government in 2001. The VWT advocated for the initiative to acknowledge the contributions of women to the state and continues to promote its inductees.

=== The Great Petition sculpture ===
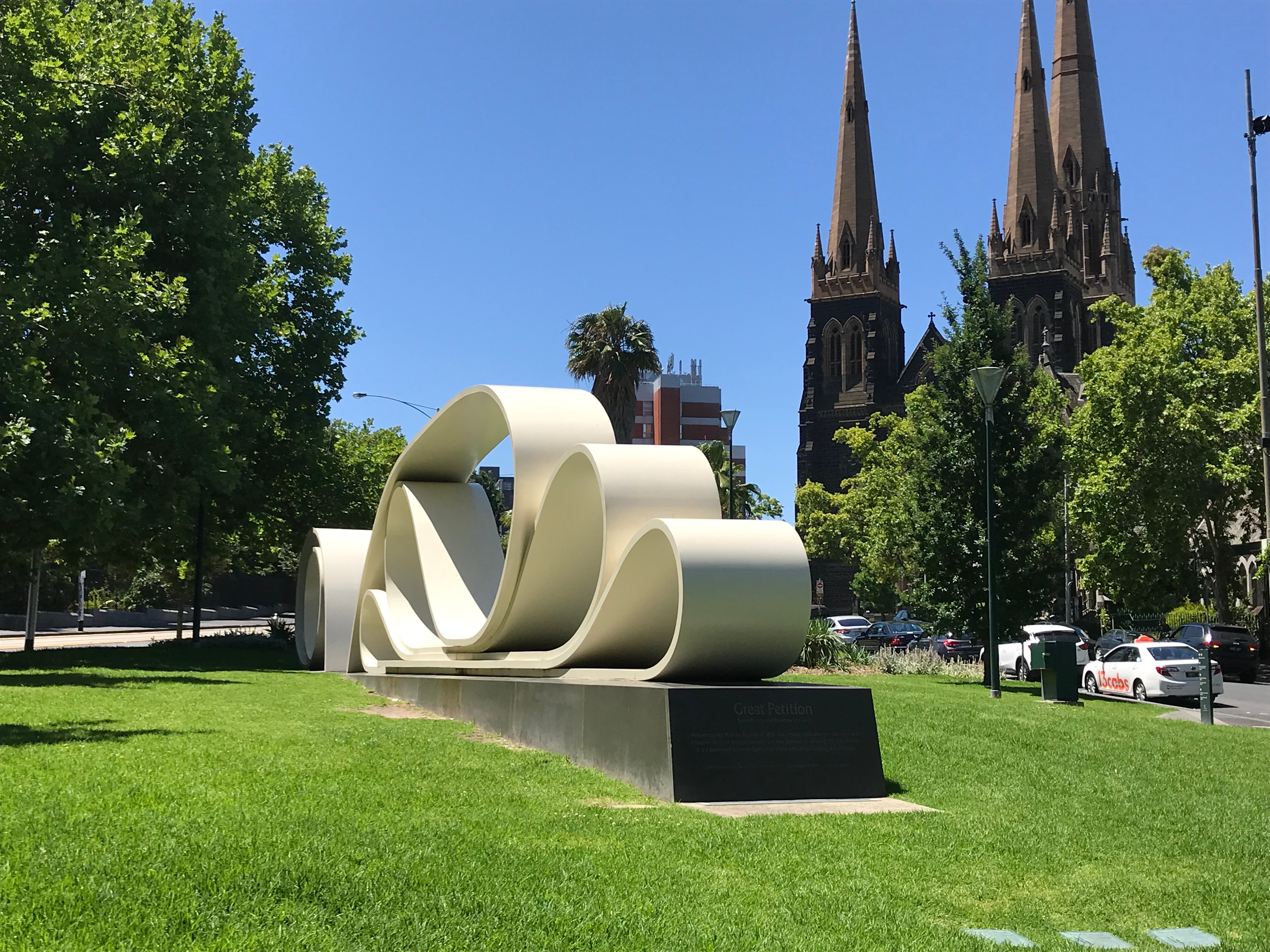
Great Petition Sculpture

In 2008, to mark the centenary of women's suffrage in Victoria, the Trust supported the commission of the Great Petition (sculpture) (also known as the Monster Petition) sculpture. Created by artists Susan Hewitt and Penelope Lee, the 20-metre rolled steel sculpture is located in Burston Reserve, near Parliament House, Melbourne.

The work commemorates the 1891 Women's Suffrage Petition, which contained nearly 30,000 signatures and was 260 metres long. The sculpture's design emulates the physical form of the original paper scrolls.

=== Madam Speaker ===
Among its managed projects is "Madam Speaker," a digital platform and initiative established to amplify women's voices in public debate and promote women's representation in leadership roles.
