= Ann McGrath =

Australian historian

Ann McGrath AM FASSA FAHA
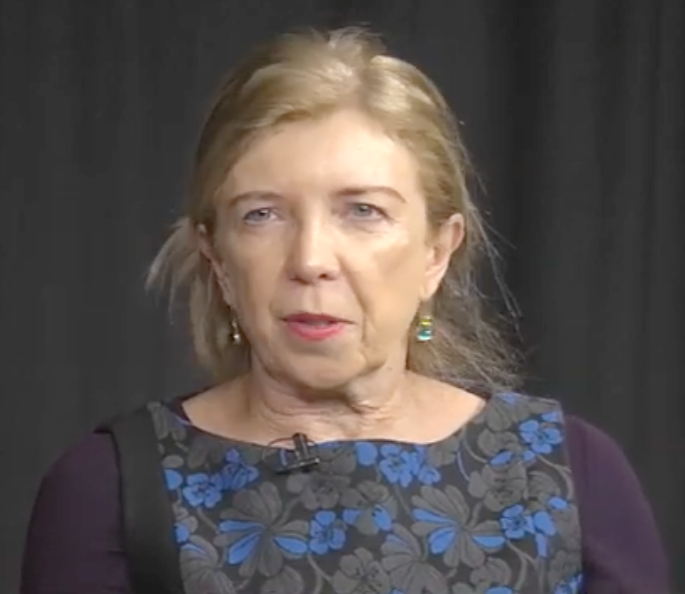
- In a 2018 interview
- Occupation: Historian

Academic background
- Education: University of Queensland BA (Hons) 1976
- Alma mater: La Trobe University PhD 1984
- Thesis: We grew up the stations: Europeans, aborigines and cattle in the Northern Territory

Ann Margaret McGrath AM FASSA FAHA is an Australian historian and academic. As of 2023 she is the WK Hancock Chair of History at the Australian National University.

== Early life and education ==
McGrath graduated with a Bachelor of Arts from the University of Queensland in 1976.

In 1984 she was awarded a PhD from La Trobe University for her thesis "We grew up the stations: Europeans, aborigines and cattle in the Northern Territory".

== Career ==
McGrath won the John Barrett Award for an article in 1994. McGrath was founding director of the Australian Centre for Indigenous History, established within the ANU School of History on 28 March 2003. She resigned this position in 2019 to create the Research Centre for Deep History within the School, a position she continues to hold as of 2023.

As of 2023 she is the WK Hancock Chair of History at ANU. She is also director of the Research Centre for Deep History, and was Kathleen Fitzpatrick ARC Laureate Fellow 2017–2022.

== Recognition ==
She was the inaugural winner of the W.K. Hancock prize of the Australian Historical Association for her first book, Born in the Cattle: Aborigines in Cattle Country, in 1988. In 1994, she was awarded the Human Rights Non-Fiction Award for Creating a Nation jointly with co-authors Patricia Grimshaw, Marilyn Lake and Marian Quartly.

McGrath was elected Fellow of the Academy of the Social Sciences in Australia in 2004.

She was awarded the Medal of the Order of Australia in 2007 and appointed a Member of the Order of Australia in 2017 for "significant service to the social sciences as an academic and researcher in the field of Indigenous history, and to tertiary education".

In 2016 her book, Illicit Love, won the General History Prize at the New South Wales Premier's History Awards. It was shortlisted for the 2016 ACT Book of the Year.

She was awarded the Kathleen Fitzpatrick Australian Laureate Fellowship for her project on the history of Australia, combining Indigenous stories with scientific data in 2017. Also in 2017, she was elected Fellow of the Australian Academy of the Humanities.

McGrath was elected an International Honorary Member of the American Academy of Arts and Sciences in 2023. In 2024 she was appointed to the Council of the National Museum of Australia.

== Selected works ==
- McGrath, Ann (January 1987), Born in the Cattle: Aborigines in cattle country, Allen & Unwin (published 1987), ISBN 978-0-04-150084-4
- Grimshaw, Patricia; Lake, Marilyn; McGrath, Ann; Quartly, Marian (1994). Creating a Nation. Ringwood, Vic., Australia: McPhee Gribble Publishers. ISBN 0-86914-095-7.
- McGrath, Ann (October 1995), Contested Ground: Australian Aborigines under the British Crown, Allen & Unwin (published 1995), ISBN 978-1-74176-490-1
- McGrath, Ann; Saunders, Kay; Huggins, Jackie (1995), Aboriginal Workers, Australian Society for the Study of Labour History, ISBN 978-0-909944-04-9 (Reissued in 2020.)
- Curthoys, Ann; McGrath, Ann (2000). Writing histories: Imagination and narration. Clayton, Vic.: School of Historical Studies, Monash University. ISBN 0-7326-1768-5.
- Curthoys, Ann; McGrath, Ann (2009), How to write history that people want to read, University of New South Wales Press, ISBN 978-1-74223-086-3
- McGrath, Ann (December 2015), Illicit love: Interracial sex and marriage in the United States and Australia, Lincoln University of Nebraska Press (published 2015), ISBN 978-0-8032-8541-5
