= Miriam Dixson =

Australian social historian

Miriam Joyce Dixson (born 1930) is an Australian social historian and the author of The Real Matilda: Woman and Identity in Australia 1788 to 1975.

== Early life and education ==
Miriam Joyce Dixson was born in Melbourne in 1930. She graduated from the University of Melbourne with a BA in history in 1950 and an MA from the same university in 1957 for her thesis, The strike of waterside workers in Australian ports, 1928, and the lockout of coal miners on the northern coalfield of New South Wales, 1929-30.

She was awarded a PhD in May 1966 by the Research School of Social Sciences at the Australian National University for her thesis, Reformists and revolutionaries: An interpretation of the relations between the Socialists and the mass labor organisations in New South Wales 1919-27, with special reference to Sydney.

== Career ==
In 1969 Dixson published a book based on her PhD thesis, The role of ideology: Lang and Labor's faction war 1920-1927, followed in 1975 by Greater than Lenin: Lang and Labor 1916-1932.

Dixson was appointed a lecturer in history at the University of New England, and in 1975 she offered Australia's first course on the history of women. In 1976, Penguin published The Real Matilda: Woman and Identity in Australia 1788 to 1975. When its third edition came out in 1994 it was considered one of four key volumes of Australian women's history, along with Beverley Kingston's My wife, my daughter, and poor Mary Ann: Women and work in Australia, Edna Ryan and Anne Conlon's Gentle Invaders: Australian Women at Work, 1788-1974 and Anne Summers' Damned Whores and God's Police: The Colonization of Women in Australia. As one writer commented, "in .. the Australian context, you can't discuss women in history as though The Real Matilda, or Damned Whores And God's Police, had never been written." A fourth edition of The Real Matilda was published in 1999.

Dixson's papers are held by the National Library of Australia.

In 1997 Dixson was awarded an honorary Doctor of Letters by the University of New England.

== Works ==
- Dixson, Miriam (1969), The role of ideology : Lang and Labor's faction war 1920-1927, Australasian Political Studies Association
- — (1975), Greater than Lenin : Lang and Labor 1916-1932, Melbourne Univ. Political Science Department
- — (1976), The Real Matilda: Woman and Identity in Australia 1788 to 1975, Penguin
- — (1999), The imaginary Australian: Anglo-Celts and identity, 1788 to the present, UNSW Press, ISBN 978-0-86840-665-7
