= Marian Quartly =

Australian social historian

Marian Quartly (born 1942) is an Australian social historian. She is professor emeritus in history at Monash University.

== Early life and education ==
Marian Quartly is the daughter of Valma Jean (née Tyler) and metalworker Gordon Henry Quartly. She was born in 1942 in Adelaide, South Australia. She attended Blair Athol State School and then Wilderness School. In 1964 she completed a BA (Hons) at the University of Adelaide. She moved to Melbourne, where she graduated with a PhD at Monash University in 1970.

== Career ==
Quartly's teaching career began at Universiti Sains Malaysia where she lectured in historical method and Malay history. In 1975 she was appointed an Australian history tutor at the University of Western Australia. From there she moved to Monash University as a lecturer in 1980 and remained there until she retired in 2006, being appointed professor emeritus. During her time at Monash she was Dean of Arts from 1994 to 1999.

In 1978 Quartly was co-founder, with Alan Atkinson, of The Push from the Bush, subtitled "A Bulletin of Social History".

In 1994, she was awarded the Human Rights Non-Fiction Award for Creating a Nation jointly with co-authors Patricia Grimshaw, Marilyn Lake and Ann McGrath.

Her book, The Middling Sort, won the 2023 T. T. Reed Book Award, presented by the South Australian Genealogical Society award for the best family history.

== Marian Quartly Prize ==
In 2018 the Australian Historical Association (AHA) renamed its Taylor and Francis Prize the Marian Quartly Prize in recognition of Quartly's contribution to its journal, History Australia. The prize is awarded for the best journal article published each calendar year.

Winners include:

- 2017: Laura Rademaker (then the Taylor and Francis Prize)
- 2018: Ben Silverstein
- 2019: Frances Steel
- 2020: Jeremy Martens
- 2021: Jordana Silverstein
- 2022: Nancy Cushing
- 2023: Tim Calabria
- 2024: Joint winners
  - Fiona Paisley
  - Joel Barnes
- 2025: Joint winners (co-authors)
  - Barbara Baird
  - Erica Millar
- 2026: Joint winners (co-authors)
  - J. A. Edgar
  - Ben Silverstein

== Works ==
=== As author ===
- Grimshaw, Patricia; Lake, Marilyn; McGrath, Ann; Quartly, Marian (1994). Creating a Nation. Ringwood, Vic., Australia: McPhee Gribble Publishers. ISBN 0-86914-095-7.
- Quartly, Marian; Swain, Shurlee; Cuthbert, Denise (November 2013). The market in babies : stories of Australian adoption. Monash University Publishing (published 2013). ISBN 978-1-921867-86-6.
- Quartly, Marian; Smart, Judith (2015). Respectable radicals : a history of the National Council of Women Australia, 1896–2006. Monash University Publishing in conjunction with the National Council of Women of Australia. ISBN 978-1-922235-94-7.
- Quartly, Marian (2023). The middling sort : a South Australian family history. Marian Quartly. ISBN 978-0-646884-09-7.

=== As editor ===
- Quartly, Marian, ed. (1979). Westralian voices : documents in Western Australian social history. University of Western Australia Press for the Education Committee of the 150th Anniversary Celebrations 1979. ISBN 978-0-85564-158-0.
- Quartly, Marian; Holmes, Katie; Grimshaw, Patricia; Janson, Susan; Quartly, Marian, eds. (1995). Documents on women in modern Australia. Allen & Unwin. ISBN 978-1-86373-736-4.
- Scully, Richard; Quartly, Marian, eds. (2009). Drawing the line : using cartoons as historical evidence. Clayton, Victoria: Monash University ePress. ISBN 9780980464856.

=== As contributor ===
- Quartly, Marian (6 December 1999). "Part 5: Victoria". In Irving, Helen (ed.). The Centenary companion to Australian federation. Cambridge University Press (published 1999). ISBN 978-0-521-57314-6.
