= Australian Historical Studies =

Academic journal

Australian Historical Studies, formerly known as Historical Studies: Australia and New Zealand (1940–1967) and Historical Studies (1967–1987), is one of the oldest historical journals in Australia. The oldest historical journal in Australia is the Journal of the Royal Australian Historical Society which commenced publication in March 1906. Australian Historical Studies is regarded, amongst others, as one of the country's leading journals of Australian history.

== History ==
The journal was first published in 1940 by the University of Melbourne's Department of History as Historical Studies: Australia and New Zealand, continuing under that name until 1967, when it adopted the name Historical Studies. In 1988 it took on its present name.

In 2003, Patricia Grimshaw was president, Joy Damousi was editor, and David Lowe was a member of the editorial board.

Between 2012 and 2015, Christina Twomey and Catharine Coleborne co-edited Australian Historical Studies, after which Twomey was appointed chair of the Board managing the journal.

== Description ==
Australian Historical Studies is a fully refereed journal, with coverage extends to all aspects of Australia's past, including how it is represented in museums and galleries; oral history; conservation of cultural heritage, archaeology, family and other histories. It also includes the political history, social history and cultural history of Australia, the Australian labour movement, the history of feminism in Australia, and other issues such as historical immigration to Australia, military history of Australia and the history of sport in Australia.

It is published quarterly by Taylor & Francis, both in print (ISSN: 1031-461X) and online (ISSN: 1940–5049), and publishes both original and previously unpublished content. Its Standard Journal Abbreviation (ISO 4) is Aust. Hist. Stud.

The editors for the 2017–2020 term are Lisa Ford of the University of New South Wales and David Andrew Roberts of the University of New England.

== Abstracts ==
The journal is abstracted by a large number of services, including the Australian Public Affairs Information Service (APAIS); British Humanities Index; Historical Abstracts; Humanities International Index; International Bibliography of Theatre & Dance; and SCOPUS (Elsevier).
