= Mornington Cemetery =

Cemetery in Mount Martha, Victoria, Australia

Details
- Established: 1855
- Location: Mount Martha, Victoria
- Country: Australia
- Coordinates: 38°15′22″S 145°01′59″E
- Owned by: Mornington Peninsula Cemetery Trust
- Website: Mornington Cemetery
- Find a Grave: Mornington Cemetery

Mornington Cemetery is a cemetery serving the Mornington Peninsula area of Melbourne. It is located at 40 Craigie Rd, Mount Martha.

The cemetery was first Surveyed in 1855, and was originally called the Mt. Martha Cemetery, then the Moorooduc Cemetery. It contains a number of pioneer graves for the district.

== Notable Interments ==
- Sheree Beasley – Murder victim
- Keith Miller AM MBE – Test Cricketer

== War graves ==
The cemetery contains the war graves of 3 Commonwealth service personnel from World War I.
