= Richard Broome =

Australian historian

Richard Broome AM, FAHA
- Born: 1 October 1948 (age 78)
- Awards: Fellowship of Australian Writers Local History Prize (1987, 2005); New South Wales Premier's Australian History Prize (2006); Fellow of the Australian Academy of the Humanities (2006); Victorian Community History Award for Best Print / Publication (2007); Member of the Order of Australia (2020)

Academic background
- Education: University of New South Wales (BA); University of Sydney (PhD)
- Thesis: Protestantism in New South Wales Society, 1900–1914 (1974)

Academic work
- Discipline: History
- Sub-discipline: Indigenous history
- Institutions: La Trobe University
- Notable works: Aboriginal Australians: A History Since 1788

Richard Laurence Broome, AM, FAHA (born 1 October 1948) is an Australian historian, academic, and emeritus professor of history at La Trobe University, Melbourne. He is known as an authority on Aboriginal history in Australia.

In 2007 Broome's book Aboriginal Victorians: A History Since 1800 won the Victorian Community History Awards for Best Print / Publication.

His book Aboriginal Australians: A History Since 1788 has had five editions, with the most recent published in 2019.

Broome was made a Member of the Order of Australia in the 2020 Australia Day Honours for "significant service to education in the field of history, and to historical groups".

== Bibliography ==
=== Author ===
- — (1980). Treasure in Earthen Vessels: Protestant Christianity in New South Wales Society, 1900–1914. St Lucia: University of Queensland Press. ISBN 0702215252.
- — (1982). Aboriginal Australians: Black Response to White Dominance, 1788–1980. Sydney: Allen & Unwin. ISBN 0868610437.
  - — (1994). Aboriginal Australians: Black Response to White Dominance, 1788–1980 (2nd ed.). St Leonards: Allen & Unwin. ISBN 186373760X.
  - — (2002). Aboriginal Australians: Black Response to White Dominance, 1788–1980 (3rd ed.). Crows Nest: Allen & Unwin. ISBN 9781865087559.
  - — (2010). Aboriginal Australians: A History Since 1788 (4th ed.). Crows Nest: Allen & Unwin. ISBN 9781742370514.
- — (1987). Coburg: Between Two Creeks. Melbourne: Lothian. ISBN 0850912784.
- —; Jackomos, Alick (1998). Sideshow Alley. St Leonards: Allen & Unwin. ISBN 1864487593.
- — (2005). Aboriginal Victorians: A History Since 1800. Crows Nest: Allen & Unwin. ISBN 9781741145694.
- —; Manning, Corinne (2006). A Man of All Tribes: The Life of Alick Jackomos. Canberra: Aboriginal Studies Press. ISBN 0855755016.
- — (2015). Fighting Hard: The Victorian Aborigines Advancement League. Canberra: Aboriginal Studies Press. ISBN 9781922059864.
- —; Fahey, Charles; Gaynor, Andrea; Holmes, Katie (2020). Mallee Country: Land, People, History. Clayton: Monash University Publishing. ISBN 9781925523126.

=== Editor ===
- —, ed. (1990). Australia's Refugee Immigrants, 1945–1951. Melbourne: La Trobe University. ISBN 0858167379.
- —, ed. (1995). Tracing Past Lives: The Writing of Historical Biography. Carlton: History Institute, Victoria. ISBN 0958889864.
- —, ed. (1997). The Colonial Experience: The Port Phillip District, 1834–1850. Bundoora: La Trobe University. ISBN 1864464127.
  - —, ed. (1999). The Colonial Experience: The Port Phillip District, 1834–1850 (2nd ed.). Bundoora: La Trobe University. ISBN 1864464127.
  - —, ed. (2009). The Colonial Experience: The Port Phillip District, 1834–1860 (3rd ed.). Bundoora: La Trobe University. ISBN 9781864464146.
  - —, ed. (2016). The Colonial Experience: The Port Phillip District, 1834–1860 (4th ed.). Bundoora: La Trobe University. ISBN 9781875585106.
- —; Barnden, Richard; Jackson, Elizabeth; Smart, Judith, eds. (2019). Melbourne's Twenty Decades: Historical Glimpses of One of the World's Most Liveable Cities. Melbourne: Royal Historical Society of Victoria. ISBN 9781875173082.
