= Martha Macintyre =

Australian anthropologist and historian

Martha Macintyre FASSA
- Born: 1945 (age 80–81)

Academic background
- Education: University of Melbourne; University of Cambridge
- Alma mater: Australian National University
- Thesis: Changing paths: An historical ethnography of the traders of Tubetube (1983)
- Influences: Roger Keesing; Michael Young

Academic work
- Institutions: La Trobe University; University of Melbourne

Martha Macintyre FASSA (born 1945) is an Australian anthropologist and historian whose work has focused on studying social change in Papua New Guinea and Melanesia. As of 2021, she is an honorary professor at the University of Melbourne.

Born in Melbourne in 1945, Macintyre was educated at Maribyrnong High School before moving to Mac Robertson Girls' High School to complete her secondary education. She then studied history at the University of Melbourne and graduated with a BA in 1970. After that she moved to England with her husband, Stuart, where she worked for the Master of King's College, Edmund Leach, cataloguing his library and studying for an MPhil in anthropology at the University of Cambridge.

Returning to Australia she was accepted to undertake a PhD at the Australian National University, which included field trips to Papua New Guinea. She combined her historical research skills with anthropological observations of matrilineal kinship.

Macintyre was elected a Fellow of the Australian Anthropological Society in 1989 and, following two terms as president was subsequently give honorary life membership. She also served as editor of The Australian Journal of Anthropology.

She was elected a Fellow of the Academy of the Social Sciences in Australia in 2012.

She was awarded an Honorary Doctorate of Letters from The University of Melbourne in 2024

== Selected publications ==
- Martha Macintyre (1983), The kula a bibliography, Cambridge Cambridge University Press, ISBN 978-0-521-23203-6
- Jolly, Margaret; Macintyre, Martha, eds. (1989), Family and gender in the Pacific : domestic contradictions and the colonial impact, Cambridge University Press, ISBN 978-0-521-13177-3
- Lahiri-Dutt, Kuntala; Macintyre, Martha, eds. (2006), Women miners in developing countries : pit women and others, Ashgate Pub. Company, ISBN 978-0-7546-4650-1
- Patterson, Mary; Macintyre, Martha, eds. (2011), Managing modernity in the Western Pacific (1st ed.), UQP, ISBN 978-0-7022-3900-7
- Biersack, Aletta; Jolly, Margaret; Macintyre, Martha, eds. (2016), Gender violence & human rights : seeking justice in Fiji, Papua New Guinea & Vanuatu, ANU Press, ISBN 978-1-76046-071-6
- Macintyre, Martha; Spark, Ceridwen, eds. (2017), Transformations of gender in Melanesia, ANU Press, ISBN 978-1-76046-089-1
