= Anne Summers =

Australian writer and journalist

Anne Summers AO
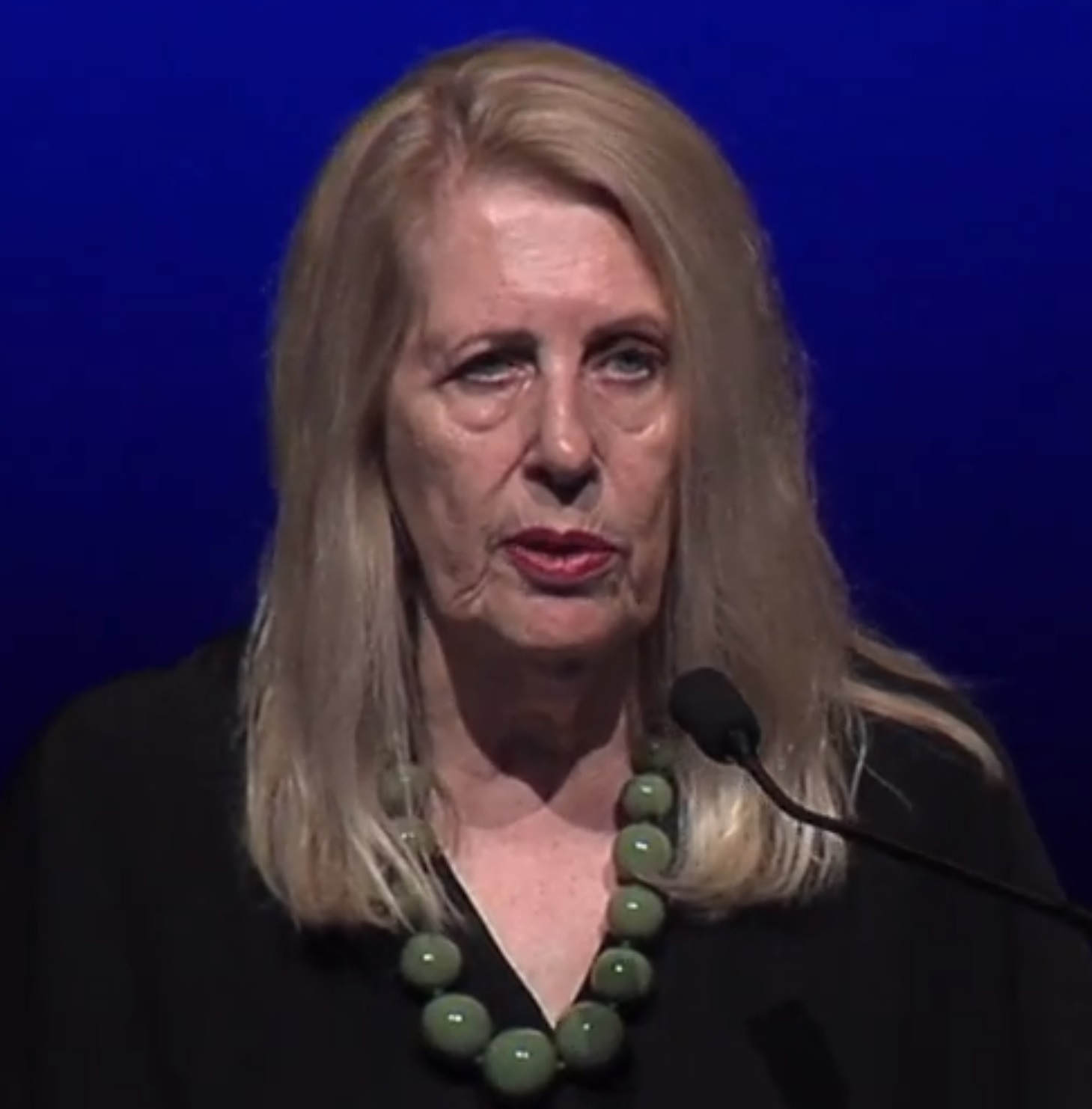
- Summers delivering the Griffith Lecture, 2018
- Born: Ann Fairhurst Cooper; 12 March 1945 (age 81); Deniliquin, New South Wales, Australia
- Occupations: Journalist, writer and feminist
- Writing career
- Genres: Nonfiction; memoir
- Subjects: Feminism; gender equity; women in history; misogyny
- Notable works: Damned Whores and God's Police; The misogyny factor; Unfettered and Alive: A Memoir

Anne Summers AO (born 12 March 1945) is an Australian writer and columnist, best known as a leading feminist, editor and publisher. She was formerly First Assistant Secretary of the Office of the Status of Women in the Department of the Prime Minister and Cabinet. Her contributions are also noted in The Australian Media Hall of Fame biographical entry.

== Early life ==
Born Ann Fairhurst Cooper in Deniliquin, New South Wales in 1945, the oldest of the six children of AHF and EF Cooper, Summers grew up in a strict Catholic household in Adelaide, South Australia, and was educated at a Catholic school in Adelaide. In her autobiography, she writes that her father (an aviation instructor) was an alcoholic and that she had a difficult relationship with her mother.

Leaving school at 17, Summers left home to take up a position in a bank in Melbourne. She then worked as a bookshop assistant until 1964 when she returned to Adelaide, enrolling at the University of Adelaide in 1965 in an arts degree in politics and history. After becoming pregnant during a brief relationship in 1965, and refusing a referral for a termination by her Adelaide doctor, she arranged an expensive abortion in Melbourne, but it was incomplete. She returned to her doctor in Adelaide and was referred to an Adelaide gynaecologist to complete the abortion safely. She credits this experience as a key influence on her later work on behalf of women.

== Career ==
While at university, Summers became a member of the Labor Club, later becoming aligned with the radical student movement and in marching against the Vietnam War. On 24 April 1967 she married a fellow student, John Summers, and the couple moved to a remote Aboriginal reserve where he worked as a teacher. Following an incident at her wedding, Summers became estranged from her father, and never returned to her maiden name despite the short life of her marriage.

In December 1969, Summers left her marriage and in 1969 became one of a group of five women to form a Women's Liberation Movement (WLM) group in Adelaide. Other Women's Liberation Movement groups were being established around Australia: an equal pay submission in the name of the movements was submitted to the Commonwealth Conciliation and Arbitration Commission in Melbourne in 1969, and a WLM meeting was held in Sydney in January 1970. The group held their first national conference in May 1970, at the University of Melbourne, with 70 feminists attending.

In 1970, having received a postgraduate scholarship to do a PhD, Summers moved to Sydney and attended the University of Sydney, from which she earned a Doctorate in Political Science and Government, awarded in 1975. Active in the Sydney Women's Liberation Movement, in 1974 Summers and other WLM members squatted in two derelict houses owned by the Anglican Diocese of Sydney, turning them into the Elsie Women's Refuge to provide shelter to women and children who were victims of domestic violence.

Summers used her postgraduate scholarship to write the book Damned Whores and God's Police which looked at the history of women in Australia. Since its publication in 1975, her book sold over 100,000 copies and holds a foundational place in Australian feminist historiography, challenging prevailing narratives by reframing national history through the lens of women’s experiences. Summers argued Australia's colonisation of Australia produced a patriarchal social order confining women to one of two roles - either "virtuous" wives and mothers ("God’s Police") or "transgressive" outcasts ("damned whores"). Summers' thesis continues to influence Australian gender studies, despite acknowledged limitations—including underrepresentation of class distinctions and Indigenous women’s experiences and is cited in ongoing debates about gender and power in Australian society. In this book, Summers wrote: “If we constantly rewrite history to fit how we see things now, we forget how things used to be and, equally important to future scholars, how we used to see them.”

She was offered a position to work as a journalist on The National Times, where she wrote an investigation into NSW prisons which led to a royal commission and to Summers' being awarded a Walkley Award.

Summers was appointed a political adviser to Labor prime minister Bob Hawke, heading the Office of the Status of Women in the Department of the Prime Minister and Cabinet from late 1983 to early 1986.

From 1986 to 1992, Summers lived in New York, becoming editor-in-chief of Ms. magazine, and, following a management buyout, co-owned the magazine, which eventually succumbed to a Moral Majority campaign and went bankrupt. She then returned to Australia and was appointed editor of the "Good Weekend" magazine, in The Sydney Morning Herald and The Age. She was also an advisor on women’s issues to Labor prime minister Paul Keating prior to the 1993 federal election. Summers joined the board of Greenpeace Australia in 1999 and from 2000 to 2006 was chair of Greenpeace International. Since 2017, she once again lives in New York.

== Awards ==
- 1976: Walkley Award (Print) for the Best Newspaper Feature Story, The National Times, Sydney
- 1989: Australia Day honour of an Officer of the Order of Australia (AO) for service to journalism and to women's affairs.
- 1994: Honorary doctorate from Flinders University, South Australia
- 2000: Honorary doctorate from the University of New South Wales
- 2001: Victorian Honour Roll of Women
- 2014: Honorary doctorate from the University of South Australia
- 2015: Honorary doctorate from the University of Adelaide
- 2017: Honorary doctorate from the University of Sydney

== Appearances ==
Summers was on the program for three events at the 2017 Brisbane Writers Festival in Brisbane, Queensland.

== Selected works ==
- Summers, Anne (1975). Damned Whores and God's Police: The Colonization of Women in Australia. Ringwood, Victoria: Penguin Books. 2nd ed 1985, 3rd ed 2002
- Bettison, Margaret; Summers, Anne (1980). Her Story, Australian Women in Print 1788-1975. Sydney: Hale & Iremonger.
- Summers, Anne Gamble (1983). Gamble for power : how Bob Hawke beat Malcolm Fraser : the 1983 federal election. Melbourne: T Nelson Australia.
- Summers, Anne (1999). Ducks on the pond : an autobiography 1945-1976. Ringwood, Victoria: Viking. ISBN 9780670882625.
- Summers, Anne (2003). The end of equality : work, babies and women's choices in 21st century Australia. Sydney: Random House.
- Summers, Anne (2008). On luck. Melbourne: Melbourne University Publishing. ISBN 978-0-522-85586-9.
- Summers, Anne (2009). The lost mother : a story of art and love. Melbourne: Melbourne University Press.
- Summers, Anne (2013). The misogyny factor. Sydney: NewSouth Publishing. ISBN 978-1-74223-384-0.
- Summers, Anne (2018). Unfettered and Alive: A Memoir. Crows Nest, NSW: Allen & Unwin. ISBN 978-1-74331-841-6.
