= Patricia Grimshaw =

Australian writer and academic

- Born: Patricia Ann Grimshaw; 16 December 1938 (age 87); Auckland, New Zealand
- Awards: Fellow of the Academy of the Social Sciences in Australia (1992); Fellow of the Australian Academy of the Humanities (1997); Officer of the Order of Australia (2017)

Academic background
- Education: University of Auckland (BA(Hons), MA); University of Melbourne (PhD)
- Thesis: Paths of Duty: American Missionary Wives in Early Nineteenth Century Hawaii (1986)

Academic work
- Institutions: University of Melbourne (1977–2006)
- Main interests: History of women Indigenous peoples
- Notable works: Women's Suffrage in New Zealand

Patricia Ann Grimshaw, AO, FASSA, FAHA (born 16 December 1938) is a retired Australian academic who specialised in women's and Indigenous peoples' history. One of her most influential works is Women's Suffrage in New Zealand, first published in 1972, which is considered the definitive work on the story of how New Zealand became the first country in the world to give women the vote.

== Background, education and early career ==
Grimshaw was born on 16 December 1938, to a working-class family in Auckland, New Zealand. She studied at the University of Auckland, graduating with a Bachelor of Arts in 1960 and a Master of Arts (MA) in 1963. Her MA thesis on women's suffrage was later published as Women's Suffrage in New Zealand in 1972, and republished in 1975 and 1987. The book became a best-seller in New Zealand in 1972, and continues to be regarded as the definitive work on the story of the New Zealand women's suffrage campaign.

In 1965, Grimshaw and her husband moved to Melbourne and Grimshaw began her doctoral studies at the University of Melbourne with Greg Dening and Inga Clendinnen. She completed her PhD in 1987, and two years later published her thesis as Paths of Duty: American Missionary Wives in Nineteenth-Century Hawaii. This work was the first to consider wives of missionaries as active participants in the colonisation process.

== Career ==
In 1977, Grimshaw joined the Department of History at the University of Melbourne as a lecturer in women's history. Two years later she began teaching a course on women's history, which then developed into a centre for women's history. During her career she supervised approximately one hundred thesis writers in women's history, and then engaged her students in collaborative research after they had graduated, thus substantially expanding the field of women's history.

In 1992, Grimshaw became a Fellow of the Academy of the Social Sciences in Australia and, in 1997, a Fellow of the Australian Academy of the Humanities. From 1995 to 2000, Grimshaw was president of the International Federation for Research in Women's History, an organisation that she had co-founded.

In 1993, Grimshaw was named Max Crawford Professor of History and held this position until her retirement in 2006.

In 2003, she was president of the editorial board of the leading historical journal Australian Historical Studies, with Joy Damousi as editor.

Since her retirement, as of 2015 she holds the title Emeritus Professor of History, and continues to work on historical projects such as The Australian Women's Register, and to deliver lectures at community events such as International Women's Day. From 2006 to 2010, she was a member of the Committee of the National Foundation for Australian Women.

== Awards ==
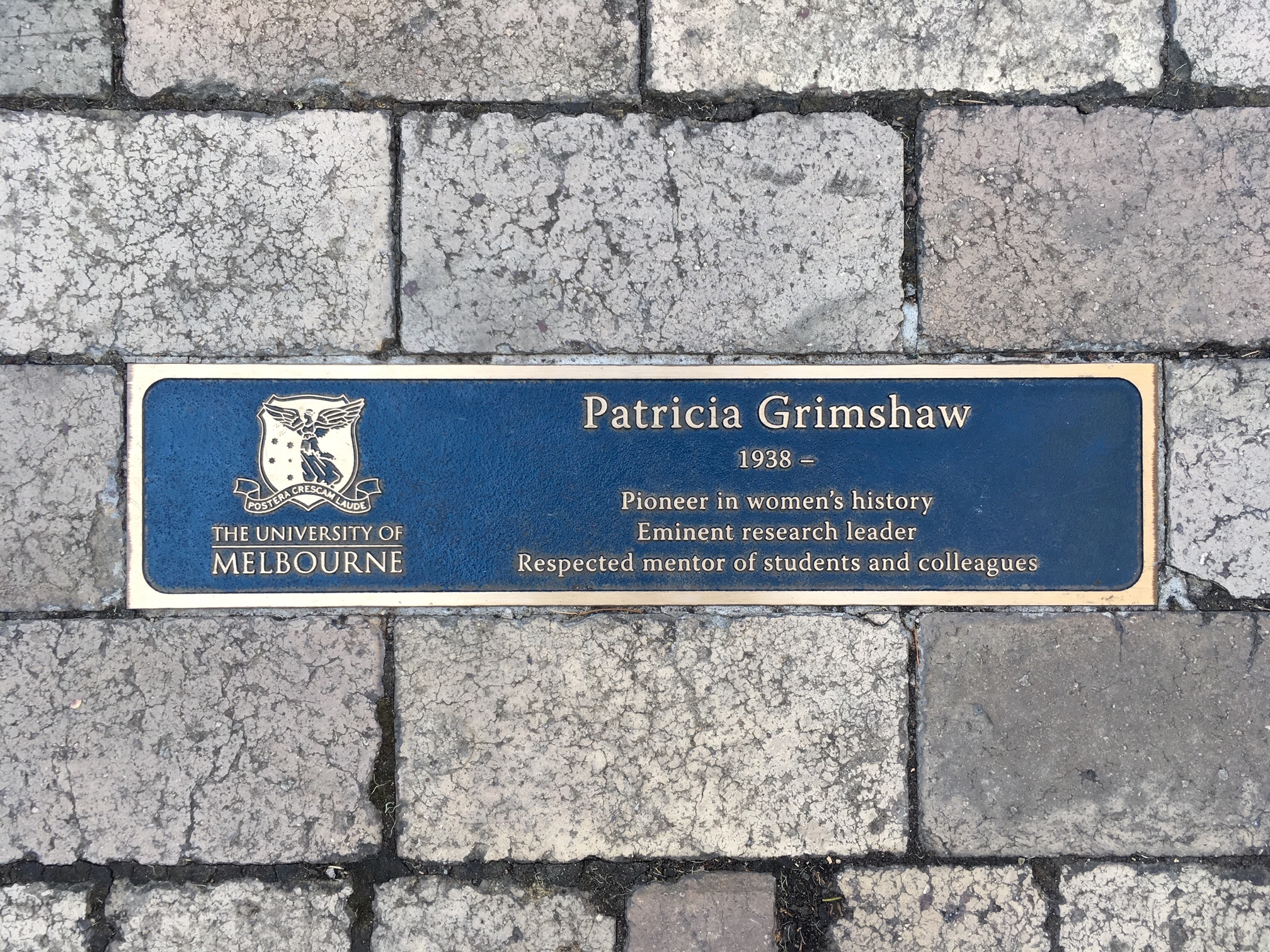
Plaque on Professors' Walk at the Parkville campus of Melbourne University.

In March 2008, Grimshaw was inducted onto the Victorian Honour Roll of Women, for pioneering women’s history.

In 2017 Grimshaw was awarded the University of Melbourne Award, which "recognises those individuals who have made an outstanding and enduring contribution to the University and its scholarly community". A bronze plaque honouring her is on the wall along the Professors' Walk at the Parkville campus of the university.

In 2017 Grimshaw was appointed an Officer of the Order of Australia for distinguished service to the social sciences and to the humanities through researching, documenting and preserving Australian history, and the roles of women in society.

== Legacy ==
The Patricia Grimshaw Awards for Mentor Excellence are awarded annually to staff at the University of Melbourne to recognise mentoring skills and behaviours. It was launched by the university in March 2008 "to honour her contribution as a mentor of postgraduate students and younger colleagues".
