= Peter Stanley bibliography =

- Books↙: 30
- Novels↙: 4
- Articles↙: 59
- Books edited↙: 8
- Booklets↙: 1
- Book chapters↙: 47

Peter Stanley is a prominent Australian military historian, who specialises in the military-social experience of war in the late nineteenth and first half of the twentieth centuries. In a career spanning more than four decades, Stanley has worked as an historian and later head of the Military History Section at the Australian War Memorial (1980–2007), head of the Centre for Historical Research at the National Museum of Australia (2007–13) and, since 2013, as Research Professor at the University of New South Wales in the Australian Centre for the Study of Armed Conflict and Society. Beginning in 1977—and as at 2023—Stanley has written (or co-written) 30 books and edited eight others, published four novels and co-authored a booklet, and contributed at least 49 chapters in books and anthologies, 59 journal articles, seven encyclopaedia entries and numerous papers. In 2011, his book Bad Characters: Sex, Crime, Mutiny, Murder and the Australian Imperial Force (2010) was the joint winner of the Prime Minister's Prize for Australian History.

== Books ==
- Stanley, Peter (1985). Bomber Command. Illustrated by Colin Archer. Lane Cove, New South Wales: Hodder & Stoughton. ISBN 0340377208.
- — (1986). A Guide to the Australian War Memorial. Sydney: John Ferguson in association with the Australian War Memorial. ISBN 0642994943.
- —; Bradley, J.; Fogarty, B.; Hobbs, K.; Macpherson, P.; Piggott, M.; Self, B. (1986). Roll Call! A Guide to Genealogical Sources in the Australian War Memorial. Canberra: Australian War Memorial. ISBN 0642994951.
- — (1986). The Remote Garrison: The British Army in Australia 1788–1870. Uniform illustrations by Lindsay Cox. Brisbane: Kangaroo Press. ISBN 0864170912.
- — (1987). Air Battle, Europe 1939–1945. Sydney: Time-life Books, Australia in association with John Ferguson. ISBN 0949118052.
- — (1993). Rosemary & Wattle: The Roll of Honour, Hall of Memory and Tomb of the Unknown Australian Soldier. Canberra: Australian War Memorial. ISBN 0642197865.
- — (1997). Tarakan: An Australian Tragedy. St. Leonards, New South Wales: Allen & Unwin. ISBN 1864482788.
- — (1998). White Mutiny: British Military Culture in India, 1825–1875. London: Hurst. ISBN 1850653305.
- —; Johnston, Mark (2002). Alamein: The Australian Story. Oxford: Oxford University Press. ISBN 0195516303.
- —; Reid, Richard; Moremon, John; Anderson, Nola (2002). Stolen Years: Australian Prisoners of War. Canberra: Department of Veterans’ Affairs. ISBN 1877007153.
- — (2003). For Fear of Pain, British Surgery, 1790–1850. Amsterdam: Rodopi. ISBN 9042010347.
- — (2004). Whyalla at War 1939–45. Whyalla, South Australia: Corporation of the City of Whyalla, with publishing assistance from East Street Publications. ISBN 0975114549.
- — (2005). Quinn's Post, Anzac, Gallipoli. Crows Nest, New South Wales: Allen & Unwin. ISBN 1741143322.
- — (2005). Borneo, 1942–1945. Canberra: Department of Veterans’ Affairs. ISBN 1920720502.
- — (2008). Invading Australia: Japan and the Battle for Australia, 1942. Camberwell, Victoria: Viking. ISBN 9780670029259.
- — (2008). A Stout Pair of Boots: A Guide to Exploring Australia's Battlefields. Crows Nest, New South Wales: Allen & Unwin. ISBN 9781741756654.
- — (2009). Men of Mont St Quentin: Between Victory and Death. Carlton North, Victoria: Scribe. ISBN 9781921215339.
- — (2009). Commando to Colditz: Micky Burn's Journey to the Far Side of Tears – The Raid on St Nazaire. Millers Point, New South Wales: Murdoch/Pier 9. ISBN 9781741963847.
- — (2010). Bad Characters: Sex, Crime, Mutiny, Murder and the Australian Imperial Force. Sydney: Murdoch/Pier 9. ISBN 9781741964806.
- — (2011). Digger Smith and Australia's Great War: Ordinary Name – Extraordinary Stories. Millers Point, New South Wales: Murdoch/Pier 9. ISBN 9781741966800.
- — (2013). Black Saturday at Steels Creek. Brunswick, Victoria: Scribe Publications. ISBN 9781922070333.
- — (2014). Lost Boys of Anzac. Sydney: NewSouth Publishing. ISBN 9781742233970.
- — (2015). Die in Battle, Do Not Despair: The Indians on Gallipoli, 1915. Solihull, United Kingdom: Helion & Company. ISBN 9781910294673.
- —; Connor, John; Yule, Peter (2015). The War at Home. The Centenary History of Australia and the Great War. Vol. IV. South Melbourne: Oxford University Press. ISBN 9780195576788.
- —; Babkenian, Vicken (2016). Armenia, Australia and the Great War. Sydney: NewSouth Publishing. ISBN 9781742233994.
- — (2017). The Crying Years: Australia's Great War. Canberra: NLA Publishing. ISBN 9780642279057.
- — (2019). 'Terriers' in India: British Territorials 1914–19. Solihull, United Kingdom: Helion & Company. ISBN 9781912390823.
- — (2022). Hul! Hul!: The Suppression of the Santal Rebellion in British India, 1855. London: Hurst & Company. ISBN 9781787385429.
- —; Tato, Maria Ines; Fontana, Luis Esteban Dalla; Mclaughlin, Rob (2023). Falklands/Malvinas 1982: A War of Two Sides. New Delhi: Routledge. ISBN 9781032438054.
- — (2024). Beyond the Broken Years: Australian Military History in 1000 Books. Sydney: NewSouth Publishing. ISBN 9781761170140.

== Novels ==
- Stanley, Peter (2011). Simpson's Donkey: A Wartime Journey to Gallipoli and Beyond. Illustrated by Michelle Dawson. Sydney: Murdoch/Pier 9. ISBN 9781741968118.
- — (2014). The Cunning Man. Manuka, Australian Capital Territory: Bobby Graham Publishers. ISBN 9780987404183.
- — (2020). The Devil's Uncle. Dickson, Australian Capital Territory: Two Dogs Leaping Press. ISBN 9780648916611.
- — (2020). Alienation. Dickson, Australian Capital Territory: Two Dogs Leaping Press. ISBN 9780648916604.

== Booklets ==
- Stanley, Peter; Burness, Peter (1999). A Guide to the Battlefields and Memorials of the Boer War. Canberra: Australian War Memorial.

== Edited books ==
- Stanley, Peter, ed. (1983). What Did You Do In the War, Daddy?: A Visual History of Propaganda Posters / A Selection from the Australian War Memorial. Melbourne: Oxford University Press. ISBN 9780195544046.
- —; McKernan, Michael, eds. (1984). Australians at War, 1885–1972: Photographs from the Collection of the Australian War Memorial. Sydney: Collins. ISBN 0002172895.
- —, ed. (1985). But Little Glory: The New South Wales Contingent to the Sudan, 1885. Canberra: Military Historical Society of Australia. ISBN 0909859248.
- —; McKernan, Michael, eds. (1986). Anzac Day Seventy Years On. Sydney: Collins. ISBN 0002175428.
- Stevens, Tom (2014). — (ed.). A Welsh Calypso: A Soldier of the Royal Welch Fusiliers in the West Indies, 1951–54. Solihull, United Kingdom: Helion & Company. ISBN 9781909982673.
- —, ed. (2017). Charles Bean: Man, Myth, Legacy. Sydney: NewSouth. ISBN 9781742234892.
- —, ed. (2018). Victory on Gallipoli and Other What-ifs of Australian History. Canberra: NLA Publishing. ISBN 9780642279217.
- —, ed. (2018). Jeff Grey: A Life in History. Canberra: School of Humanities & Social Sciences, UNSW Canberra. ISBN 9780646989624.

== Articles and chapters ==
=== Book chapters ===
- Stanley, Peter (1988). "Soldiers and Fellow Countrymen in Colonial Australia". In Browne, Margaret; McKernan, Michael (eds.). Australia: Two Centuries of War and Peace. Canberra: Australian War Memorial. ISBN 9780642995025.
- — (1995). "Anzac and Army: Reflections on Army and Society in Australia, 1895–1995". In Horner, David (ed.). Armies and Nation-Building: Past Experience – Future Prospects. Canberra: Strategic and Defence Studies Centre. ISBN 0731523008.
- — (1998). "Who Won the War in 1944?: Nationalism and Australian Historians of the Second World War". In Bridge, Carl (ed.). Ranging Shots: New Directions in Australian Military History. London: Sir Robert Menzies Centre for Australian Studies, University of London. ISBN 1855070928.
- — (2001). "Military Culture and Military Protest: The Bengal Europeans and The 'White Mutiny' of 1859". In Hathaway, Jane (ed.). Rebellion, Repression, Reinvention: Mutiny in Comparative Perspective. Westport: Praeger. ISBN 0275970108.
- — (2001). "Borneo". In Beaumont, Joan (ed.). Australian Defence: Sources and Statistics. The Australian Centenary History of Defence. Vol. 6. Melbourne: Oxford University Press. ISBN 9780195541182.
- — (2001). "Volunteer Defence Corps". In Beaumont, Joan (ed.). Australian Defence: Sources and Statistics. The Australian Centenary History of Defence. Vol. 6. Melbourne: Oxford University Press. ISBN 9780195541182.
- — (2002). "The Men Who Did the Fighting Are Now All Busy Writing: Australian Post-Mortems on Defeat in Malaya and Singapore, 1942–45". In Farrell, Brian; Hunter, Sandy (eds.). Sixty Years On: The Fall of Singapore Revisited. Singapore: Eastern Universities Press. pp. 290–312. ISBN 9789812102027.
- — (2003). "The Gunner: J.E. Macdonnell and the Face of Naval Battle". In Reeve, John; Stevens, David (eds.). The Face of Naval Battle: The Human Experience of Modern War at Sea. Crows Nest, New South Wales: Allen & Unwin. ISBN 1865086673.
- — (2003). "Gavin Long and History at the Australian War Memorial". In Grey, Jeffrey (ed.). The Last Word?: Essays on Official History in the United States and the British Commonwealth. Westport: Praeger. pp. 105–116. ISBN 0313310831.
- — (2004). "'He's (Not) Coming South': The Invasion That Wasn't". In Bullard, Steven; Keiko, Tamura (eds.). From A Hostile Shore: Australia and Japan At War in New Guinea (PDF). Canberra: Australian War Memorial. ISBN 0975190407.
- — (2005). "Finest Hour: The British Commonwealth at War". In Brandon, Laura (ed.). Shared Experience: Art & War: Australia, Britain & Canada in the Second World War. Canberra: Australian War Memorial. ISBN 0975190423.
- — (2006). "'The Dutch Are a Mob of Bastards': Australian-Dutch Relations in the Pacific War". In Shaw, Lindsey; Wilkins, Wendy (eds.). Dutch Connections: 400 Years of Australian-Dutch Maritime Links 1606–2006. Sydney: Australian National Maritime Museum. pp. 110–125. ISBN 9780977547104.
- — (2006). "Imperial Military History". In Hughes, Matthew; Philpott, William J. (eds.). Palgrave Advances in Modern Military History. Basingstoke: Palgrave Macmillan. ISBN 9781403917676.
- — (2008). "Kokoda". In Cochrane, Peter (ed.). Australian Greats. Sydney: William Heinemann. ISBN 9781741665925.
- — (2008). "The Gallipoli Campaign: History and Memory, Myth and Legend". In Gare, Deborah; Ritter, David (eds.). Making Australian History: Perspectives on the Past since 1788. Sydney: Thomson. pp. 311–316. ISBN 9780170346924.
- — (2010). "Dramatic Myth and Dull Truth: Invasion by Japan in 1942". In Stockings, Craig (ed.). Zombie Myths of Australian Military History. Sydney: University of New South Wales Press. ISBN 9781742230795.
- — (2011). "Revealing Revealing Gallipoli". In Beirne, Rebecca; Bennett, James (eds.). Making Film and Television Histories. New York: Palgrave Macmillan. ISBN 9781848859432.
- — (2011). "'He Was Black, He Was a White Man, and a Dinkum Aussie': Race and Empire in Revisiting the Anzac Legend". In Das, Santanu (ed.). Race, Empire and First World War Writing. Cambridge: Cambridge University Press. ISBN 9780521509848.
- — (2011). "War and Australia's Museums". In Griffin, Des; Paroissien, Leon (eds.). Understanding Museums: Australian Museums and Museology (ebook). Canberra: National Museum of Australia.
- — (2012). "Monumental Mistake: Is War the Most Important Thing in Australian History?". In Stockings, Craig (ed.). Anzac's Dirty Dozen: 12 Myths of Australian Military History. Sydney: NewSouth Publishing. pp. 260–286. ISBN 9781742232881.
- — (2012). "'The Part We Played in This Show': Australians and El Alamein". In Edwards, Jill (ed.). El Alamein and the Struggle for North Africa: International Perspectives from the Twenty-First Century. Cairo: American University in Cairo Press. pp. 59–72. ISBN 9789774165818.
- — (2013). "War Without End". In Clark, Anna; Ashton, Paul (eds.). Australian History Now. Sydney: NewSouth Publishing. pp. 90–106. ISBN 9781742233710.
- — (2013). "'Gone to Navy': Defending Australia". In Hetherington, Michelle (ed.). Glorious Days: Australia 1913. Canberra: National Museum of Australia Press. pp. 36–45. ISBN 9781921953064.
- — (2013). "British Soldiers in Colonial Australia". In Stockings, Craig; Connor, John (eds.). Before the Anzac Dawn: A Military History of Australia to 1914. Sydney: NewSouth Publishing. pp. 39–61. ISBN 9781742233697.
- — (2013). "The Great War and its Aftermath, 1914–22". In Bashford, Alison; Macintyre, Stuart (eds.). The Commonwealth of Australia. The Cambridge History of Australia. Vol. 2. Port Melbourne: Cambridge University Press. pp. 39–63. ISBN 9781107011540.
- — (2014). "Life at Gallipoli". In Horner, David (ed.). Gallipoli 100: Lest We Forget. Sydney: Faircount Media Group. pp. 116–119.
- — (2014). "Holding Quinn's Post". In Horner, David (ed.). Gallipoli 100: Lest We Forget. Sydney: Faircount Media Group. pp. 126–127.
- — (2014). "The Indian Army". In Horner, David (ed.). Gallipoli 100: Lest We Forget. Sydney: Faircount Media Group. pp. 191–193.
- — (2016). "Gallipoli". In Singh-Sohal, Jay (ed.). The Sikh Chronicles. Birmingham, United Kingdom: Dot Hyphen Publishers. pp. 59–61.
- —; Hastings, Peter (2016). "'To Capture Tarakan': Was Operation Oboe 1 Unnecessary?". In Dean, Peter J. (ed.). Australia 1944–45: Victory in the Pacific. Port Melbourne: Cambridge University Press. pp. 278–297. ISBN 9781107083462.
- — (2016). "'The Finest Type of Coloured Men': Indians' and New Zealanders' Encounters on Gallipoli". In Crawford, John; Littlewood, David; Watson, James (eds.). Experience of a Lifetime: People, Personalities and Leaders of the First World War. Auckland: Massey University Press. pp. 120–137. ISBN 9780994130013.
- —; Nichols, Robert (2016). "Naming the Day: ANZAC or Anzac". In Frame, Tom (ed.). Anzac Day: Then and Now. Sydney: NewSouth. pp. 69–89. ISBN 9781742247694.
- — (2017). "Australian Heroes: Some Military Mates Are More Equal Than Others". In Stephens, David; Broinowski, Alison (eds.). The Honest History Book. Sydney: NewSouth. pp. 196–210. ISBN 9781742235264.
- — (2017). "The Enigma: General Sir Cyril Bingham Brudenell White". In Stockings, Craig; Connor, John (eds.). The Shadow Men: The Leaders Who Shaped the Australian Army from the Veldt to Vietnam. Sydney: NewSouth. ISBN 9781742248233.
- — (2017). "Introduction". In Stanley, Peter (ed.). Charles Bean: Man, Myth, Memory. Sydney: NewSouth. pp. 1–6. ISBN 9781742234892.
- — (2017). "An Adequate Memorial". In Stanley, Peter (ed.). Charles Bean: Man, Myth, Memory. Sydney: NewSouth. pp. 135–144. ISBN 9781742234892.
- — (2018). "1914: The Australian Imperial Force Garrisons India". In Stanley, Peter (ed.). Victory on Gallipoli and Other What-ifs of Australian History. Canberra: NLA Publishing. pp. 69–78. ISBN 9780642279217.
- — (2018). "1915: Victory on Gallipoli". In Stanley, Peter (ed.). Victory on Gallipoli and Other What-ifs of Australian History. Canberra: NLA Publishing. pp. 79–88. ISBN 9780642279217.
- — (2018). "1941: The Balls of Bob Menzies". In Stanley, Peter (ed.). Victory on Gallipoli and Other What-ifs of Australian History. Canberra: NLA Publishing. pp. 151–158. ISBN 9780642279217.
- — (2018). "1985: The Bombs – Almost the End of the World". In Stanley, Peter (ed.). Victory on Gallipoli and Other What-ifs of Australian History. Canberra: NLA Publishing. pp. 193–200. ISBN 9780642279217.
- — (2018). "Numerous Debts". In Stanley, Peter (ed.). Jeff Grey: A Life in History. Canberra: School of Humanities & Social Sciences, UNSW Canberra. pp. 45–59. ISBN 9780646989624.
- — (2018). "Temporary Sahibs: Terriers in India in 1917". In Abbenhuis, Maartje; Atkinson, Neill; Baird, Kingsley; Romano, Gail (eds.). The Myriad Legacies of 1917. Basingstoke: Palgrave Macmillan. pp. 151–168. ISBN 9783319736846.
- — (2018). "Terriers in India: A Preliminary Report". In Jeffreys, Alan (ed.). The Indian Army in the First World War. Solihull, United Kingdom: Helion & Company. pp. 270–280. ISBN 9781911512783.
- — (2018). "Marigolds and Poppies: Commemorating 'Indian' War Dead". In Wellings, Ben; Sumartojo, Shanti (eds.). Commemorating Race and Empire in the First World War Centenary. Liverpool, United Kingdom: Liverpool University Press. pp. 39–49. ISBN 9781786940889.
- — (2020). "The Sound of the Cow: Observing Remembrance Day in New Delhi". In Sumartojo, Shanti (ed.). Experiencing 11 November 2018: Commemoration and the First World War Centenary. London: Bloomsbury Academic. pp. 97–106. ISBN 9781003085362.
- — (2020). "'Gonzo' Historians and the Emotional Turn in Australian Military History". In Damousi, Joy; Tout-Smith, Deborah; Ziino, Bart (eds.). Museums, History and the Intimate Experience of the Great War: Love and Sorrow. London: Routledge. pp. 123–135. ISBN 9780367487546.
- — (2021). "Afterword". In Kieser, Hans-Lukas; Nunn, Pearl; Schmutz, Thomas (eds.). Remembering the Great War in the Middle East: From Turkey and Armenia to Australia and New Zealand. London: Bloomsbury Publishing. pp. 281–287. ISBN 9781788313773.

=== Chapters in anthologies ===
- Stanley, Peter (2004). "Tarakan: An Australian Tragedy". In Gerster, Robin; Pierce, Peter (eds.). On the War-path: An Anthology of Australian Military Travel. Carlton, Victoria: Melbourne University Press. ISBN 0522850871.
- — (2012). "Quinn's Post". In Gold, Irma (ed.). The Invisible Thread: One Hundred Years of Words. Illustrated by Judy Horacek. Ultimo, New South Wales: Halstead Press. ISBN 9781920831967.

=== Journal articles ===
- Stanley, Peter (April 1977). "Kitchener's Army and the North of England, 1914–1916". Sabretache: Journal of the Military Historical Society of Australia. 18 (2): 88–91.
- — (September 1980). "A Mere Point of Military Etiquette: The Norfolk Island Mutiny of 1839". The Push from the Bush: A Bulletin of Social History (7): 1–12.
- — (January 1981). "Bluey the Sig: The Memoirs of Sapper Dadswell". Sabretache: Journal of the Military Historical Society of Australia. 22 (1): 7–12.
- — (April 1981). "'An Entente ... Most Remarkable': Indians at Anzac". Sabretache: Journal of the Military Historical Society of Australia. 22 (2): 17–21.
- — (November 1981). "'Oh! The Sufferings of My Men': The 80th Regiment in New South Wales in 1838". The Push from the Bush: A Bulletin of Social History (11): 1–22.
- — (January 1982). "RQMS Neaves at Pozières". Sabretache: Journal of the Military Historical Society of Australia. 23 (1): 13–17.
- — (April 1983). "Ensign Hamilton's Letter". Sabretache: Journal of the Military Historical Society of Australia. 24 (2).
- — (July 1983). "Reflections on Bean's Last Paragraph". Sabretache: Journal of the Military Historical Society of Australia. 24 (3): 4–11.
- — (January 1984). "British Infantry Regiments of the Line and the Empire, 1840–69". Sabretache: Journal of the Military Historical Society of Australia. 25 (1): 4–7.
- — (March 1984). "The Army in Decay?". Soldiers of the Queen: The Journal of the Victorian Military Society (36): 10–12.
- — (April 1984). "A Note On a Lone Pine Uniform". Sabretache: Journal of the Military Historical Society of Australia. 25 (2): 23–24.
- — (April 1984). "Frederick Whirlpool, VC". Journal of the Australian War Memorial.
- — (July 1984). "Australian Joint Copying Project: Recent Additions of Australian Military Historical Interest". Sabretache: Journal of the Military Historical Society of Australia. 25 (3).
- — (October 1984). "The Soldiers on the Hill: The Defence of Whyalla, 1939–1945: Part 1". Sabretache: Journal of the Military Historical Society of Australia. 25 (4).
- — (January 1985). "Colonial Military History in Australia". Soldiers of the Queen: The Journal of the Victorian Military Society (41): 16–18.
- — (April 1985). "Gallipoli and Pozières: A Legend and a Memorial". Australian Foreign Affairs Record. 56 (4): 282–289.
- — (January 1985). "The Soldiers on the Hill: The Defence of Whyalla, 1939–1945: Part 2". Sabretache: Journal of the Military Historical Society of Australia. 26 (1).
- — (April 1985). "The Soldiers on the Hill: The Defence of Whyalla, 1939–1945: Part 3". Sabretache: Journal of the Military Historical Society of Australia. 26 (2).
- — (July 1985). "The Soldiers on the Hill: The Defence of Whyalla, 1939–1945: Part 4". Sabretache: Journal of the Military Historical Society of Australia. 26 (3).
- — (January 1986). "The Soldiers on the Hill: The Defence of Whyalla, 1939–1945: Part 5". Sabretache: Journal of the Military Historical Society of Australia. 27 (1).
- — (April 1986). "The Soldiers on the Hill: The Defence of Whyalla, 1939–1945: Part 6". Sabretache: Journal of the Military Historical Society of Australia. 27 (2).
- — (October 1986). "Witness to History: A Diary of the Sydney-Emden Battle". Sabretache: Journal of the Military Historical Society of Australia. 27 (4).
- — (January 1987). "The Soldiers on the Hill: The Defence of Whyalla, 1939–1945: Part 7". Sabretache: Journal of the Military Historical Society of Australia. 28 (1).
- — (April 1987). "The Soldiers on the Hill: The Defence of Whyalla, 1939–1945: Part 8". Sabretache: Journal of the Military Historical Society of Australia. 28 (2).
- — (January 1988). "The Soldiers on the Hill: The Defence of Whyalla, 1939–1945: Part 9". Sabretache: Journal of the Military Historical Society of Australia. 29 (1).
- — (April 1988). "The Uniforms of The Remote Garrison: An Argument About the Interpretation of Historical Dress". Sabretache: Journal of the Military Historical Society of Australia. 29 (2): 20–32.
- — (October 1988). "'A Horn to Put Your Powder In': Interpreting Artefacts of British Soldiers in Colonial Australia". Journal of the Australian War Memorial: 13–29.
- — (October 1988). "Calling a Truce: 'Amateurs' and 'Academics' in Australian Military History". Sabretache: Journal of the Military Historical Society of Australia. 29 (4): 21–27.
- — (March 1990). "The Riddles of ANZAC" (PDF). Australian Defence Force Journal (81): 70–73. Archived from the original (PDF) on 2009-10-30.
- — (March 1991). "Heritage of Strangers: The Australian Army's British legacy" (PDF). Australian Defence Force Journal (87): 21–26.
- — (November 1991). "Research and the Australian War Memorial: The AWM Research Grants Scheme, 1976–91". Journal of the Australian War Memorial: 42–43.
- — (April 1993). "The Green Hole: Exploring Our Neglect of the New Guinea Campaigns of 1943–44". Sabretache: Journal of the Military Historical Society of Australia. 34 (2): 3–11.
- — (November 1993). "Happy Birthday, HRS: A Decade of the Australian War Memorial's Historical Research Section". Public History Review: 54–65.
- — (April 1994). "Echoes of the Guns: Remembering the Great War, 1914–18". Journal of the Australian War Memorial (24).
- — (October 1994). "'Sniffing the Ground': Australians and Borneo – 1945, 1994". Journal of the Australian War Memorial (25).
- — (1996). "'Dear Comrades': Barrack-room Culture and the 'White Mutiny' of 1859–60". Indo-British Review.
- — (1996). "The Australian War Memorial: National or Nationalist Institution?". Agora. 31 (4): 11–19.
- — (June 1996). "Shaik Abdoolah, or the Reluctant Renegade". Soldiers of the Queen: The Journal of the Victorian Military Society (85).
- — (August 1996). "The Moon under Water: The Australian War Memorial's Staff Research Policy". Museum National. 5 (1).
- — (Winter 1996). "'Highly Inflammatory Writings': Soldiers' Graffiti and the Indian Rebellion". Journal of the Society for Army Historical Research. 74 (4).
- — (March 1998). "'Our Big World': The Social History of the Light Horse Regiment, 1916–18". Sabretache: Journal of the Military Historical Society of Australia. 39 (1).
- — (November 1998). "'A Reasonable Degree of Recognition': The Australian War Memorial, Veterans and the Second World War Gallery". Locality.
- — (December 1998). "Paul the Pimp Re-considered: Australian 'G' Staffs on the Western Front and the 'Kiggell Anecdote'". Sabretache: Journal of the Military Historical Society of Australia. 39 (4).
- — (March 1999). "Being Dead, Yet Speaketh: Berhampore, a Bengal Cantonment". Soldiers of the Queen: The Journal of the Victorian Military Society (96).
- — (October 2002). "Great in Adversity: Indian Prisoners of War in New Guinea". Journal of the Australian War Memorial. 37.
- — (Spring 2005). "Threat Made Manifest". Griffith Review (9): 11–24.
- — (Autumn–Winter 2005). "Australia and 1945". Everyone's War: The Journal of the Second World War Experience Centre (12).
- — (July 2005). "'An Extraordinary Town...': Whyalla Sixty Years Ago". History Matters. 15 (2).
- — (2007). "In the Street of the Historians: Practising History at the Australian War Memorial" (PDF). Dialogue: Academy of the Social Sciences in Australia. 26 (2).
- — (Winter 2007). "What is the Battle for Australia?" (PDF). Australian Army Journal. 4 (2): 17–34.
- — (August 2008). "Reflections of a Public Historian on a Battle for Australia". Symposium: Newsletter of the Australian Academy of the Humanities (40): 14–17.
- — (April 2010). "Working Machines and 'Broken Britain': Re-enactment and the Historical Politics of Goodwood Revival". ReCollections: A Journal of Museums and Collections. 5 (1).
- —; Scates, Bruce; et al. (July 2012). "Anzac Day at Home and Abroad: Towards a History of Australia's National Day". History Compass. 10 (7): 523–536. doi:10.1111/j.1478-0542.2012.00862.x.
- — (April 2014). "Sulabh International Museum of Toilets, New Delhi". ReCollections: A Journal of Museums and Collections. 9 (1).
- — (April 2014). "Not Only, But Also: A Short History of Honest History". History Australia: Journal of the Australian Historical Association. 11 (1): 219–224. doi:10.1080/14490854.2014.11668508. S2CID 143175301.
- — (April 2015). "Remembering Gallipoli in a Global Context: India". History Australia: Journal of the Australian Historical Association. 12 (1): 43. doi:10.1080/14490854.2015.11668549. S2CID 218623112.
- — (Winter 2015). "A Hundred in a Million". Griffith Review (48): 262–271.
- — (October 2015). "Fading Colours: Britain's Regimental Museums". ReCollections: A Journal of Museums and Collections. 10 (2).
- — (January 2017). "Diminishing City". Griffith Review (55).

=== Conference proceedings ===
- Stanley, Peter (1995). "An Oboe Concerto: Reflections on the Borneo landings, 1945". In Wahlert, Glenn (ed.). Australian Army Amphibious Operations in the South-West Pacific 1942–45: Edited Papers of the Australian Army History Conference Held at the Australian War Memorial, 15 November 1994 (PDF). Georges Heights, New South Wales: Army Doctrine Centre. ISBN 0642226679. Archived from the original (PDF) on 24 March 2016.
- — (2000). "With Banjo to Kimberley: Banjo Paterson's South African Verse as History". In Dennis, Peter; Grey, Jeffrey (eds.). The Boer War: Army, Nation and Empire: The 1999 Chief of Army/Australian War Memorial Military History Conference (PDF). Canberra: Army History Unit. ISBN 0642704821.
- — (2001). "Diversity of Visitors, Diversity of Interpretation: The Australian War Memorial's Second World War Gallery". In McIntyre, Darryl; Wehner, Kirsten (eds.). Negotiating Histories: National Museums: Conference Proceedings. Canberra: National Museum of Australia. ISBN 1876944013.
- — (2004). "The Green Hole Reconsidered". In Dennis, Peter; Grey, Jeffrey (eds.). Foundations of Victory; The Pacific War 1943–1944: The Chief of Army's History Conference 2003 (PDF). Canberra: Army History Unit. ISBN 0646435906.

=== Encyclopaedia entries ===
- Stanley, Peter (1995). "The British Army in Australia". In Dennis, Peter; Grey, Jeffrey; Ewan, Morris; et al. (eds.). The Oxford Companion to Australian Military History. Melbourne: Oxford University Press. ISBN 0195532279.
- — (2003). "Army Temperance Association". In Fahey, David; Tyrrell, Ian; Blocker, Jack (eds.). Alcohol and Temperance in Modern History: An International Encyclopedia. Vol. I. Santa Barbara: ABC-CLIO. ISBN 1576078337.
- — (2004). "Australia". In Keat Gin, Ooi (ed.). Southeast Asia: A Historical Encyclopedia, from Angkor Wat to East Timor. Santa Barbara: ABC-CLIO. ISBN 1576077705.
- — (2004). "Admiral Lord Louis Mountbatten". In Keat Gin, Ooi (ed.). Southeast Asia: A Historical Encyclopedia, from Angkor Wat to East Timor. Santa Barbara: ABC-CLIO. ISBN 1576077705.
- — (2004). "General Douglas MacArthur". In Keat Gin, Ooi (ed.). Southeast Asia: A Historical Encyclopedia, from Angkor Wat to East Timor. Santa Barbara: ABC-CLIO. ISBN 1576077705.
- — (2004). "Sandakan Death March". In Keat Gin, Ooi (ed.). Southeast Asia: A Historical Encyclopedia, from Angkor Wat to East Timor. Santa Barbara: ABC-CLIO. ISBN 1576077705.
- — (2004). "South-East Asia Command". In Keat Gin, Ooi (ed.). Southeast Asia: A Historical Encyclopedia, from Angkor Wat to East Timor. Santa Barbara: ABC-CLIO. ISBN 1576077705.

=== Popular history articles ===
- Stanley, Peter (April 1998). "The Shoot and Scoot Brigade: Australian Trench Mortar Batteries on the Western Front, 1916–18". Wartime (2).
- — (Summer 1998). "'Huzza, My Boys, for Botany Bay': The Soldier's Farewell". Wartime (4).
- — (1999). "Names, Faces and Stories: Four Stories from the Memorial's New Second World War Exhibition". Wartime (5).
- — (Summer 1999). "'Rendering them Safe': Royal Australian Navy Volunteer Reserve Mine Disposal Officers during the Second World War". Wartime (5).
- — (Summer 1999). "Getting Our Knees Brown: Exploring the El Alamein Battlefield". Wartime (8): 22–24.
- — (Autumn 2000). "Michael Sheehan's War". Wartime (10).
- — (Summer 2000). "A Bold Risk: Kaiapit". Wartime (12).
- — (January 2001). "'Wild Eye' the Souvenir King". Wartime (13): 18–20.
- — (Spring 2001). "A Good Dishing: 42nd Street". Wartime (15).
- — (Autumn 2002). "Farewell, Once More". Wartime (17).
- — (January 2003). "Our Little Imbros Cottage". Wartime (21): 56–57.
- — (July 2003). "New Guinea Offensives". Wartime (23).
- — (October 2003). "Charlie and Joan". Wartime (24).
- — (January 2004). "One Big Unit". Wartime (25): 29–32.
- — (January 2004). "Official History On Line". Wartime (25): 58–60.
- — (October 2004). "'Founder' of the Australian War Museum". Wartime (28).
- — (November 2004). "The People's Poppies". Capital Magazine.
- — (11 November 2004). "Legends in Our Lifetime". The Australian.
- — (January 2005). "Quinn's Post: 'The Most Critical Position'". Wartime (29).
- — (April 2005). "Arguing about Gallipoli". Wartime (30).
- — (April 2005). "Australia and Denmark in War". Wartime (30).
- — (April 2005). "Sandakan: The Greatest Atrocity". Wartime (30).
- —; Manera, Brad (April 2005). "Two seasons on Gallipoli". Wartime (30).
- — (23–24 April 2005). "How History Has Changed the Anzac Legend". The Courier-Mail. Brisbane.
- — (25 April 2005). "Good Idea, Bad Execution". The Australian.
- — (25 April 2005). "A Hush Over the Peninsula". The Australian.
- — (9 May 2005). "The Pacific War Was Closer, But Europe Was Our Victory Too". The Australian.
- — (July 2005). "Soldier of 'Utmost Courage': Diver Derrick". Wartime (31).
- —; Alperovitz, Gar; Blair, Teruko (July 2005). "Dropping the Bomb". Wartime (31).
- — (12 August 2005). "Our Invasion Myth". The Australian Financial Review.
- — (12 August 2005). "Jubilant VP Celebrations". The Canberra Times.
- — (September 2005). "Turkish Delight". Two Wheels Scooter (6).
- — (October 2005). "Weary Dunlop: Emblematic Prisoner". Wartime (32): 12–13.
- — (November 2005). "Writing History". ACTWrite.
- —; Hore-Lacy, John (April 2006). "A Happy Lot on Tarakan". Wartime (34).
- — (April 2006). "The Mutiny That Wasn't". Wartime (34).
- — (October 2006). "More Than Just a Comic Strip". Wartime (36).
- — (April 2008). "Writing History: Finding the Bridge". ACTWrite. 14 (3): 4.
- — (26 July 2008). "Australia Invaded by a Myth". The Canberra Times.
- — (6 August 2008). "Understanding the Invasion Myth". On-Line Opinion: Australia's e-Journal of Social and Political Debate.
- — (3 September 2008). "What 'Battle for Australia'?". ABC Unleashed.
- — (11 November 2008). "The Guns Are Silent But the Questions Remain". Sydney Morning Herald.
- — (December 2008). "Out and About With the Centre for Historical Research". Friends Magazine. 19 (4).
- — (6 March 2009). "High Time For New Demarcation of War's Frontier". The Canberra Times.
- — (11 April 2010). "A War on Emotion". The Canberra Times.
- — (April 2012). "Four Words I Hate". ACTWrite. 18 (3): 10.
- — (9 January 2013). "Quinn's Post". The Age. Melbourne.
- — (March 2013). "In Search of the Lost Boys of Anzac". Inside History (15): 52–55.
- — (27 August 2013). "Gallipoli – 98 Years On". On-Line Opinion: Australia's e-Journal of Social and Political Debate.
- — (Winter 2013). "Jai Hind! And Banzai!". Wartime (63): 26–29.
- — (June 2013). "Australia's Misplaced Friendship with Turkey". Eureka Street. 23 (17): 60–61.
- — (Spring 2013). "What to Know In Egypt". Wartime (64): 52–57.
- — (December 2014). "Wesley College Athletic Team, 1914". In the Frame. The National Library of Australia Magazine. 6 (4): 18–19.
- — (March 2015). "'Leaving for the Dardanelles' 1915" (PDF). In the Frame. The National Library of Australia Magazine. 7 (1): 18–19.
- — (April 2015). "What Should Editors Check? Spilling the Beans On a Cautionary Tale" (PDF). The Canberra Editor. 24 (2): 10–11.
- — (18 April 2015). "The Early Recruits Became the Lost Boys of Anzac". Herald Sun. Melbourne.
- — (24 April 2015). "Our First Wars Forgotten". Centralian Advocate. Alice Springs.
- — (June 2015). "'Off to the Great War' : Woolloomooloo, 1915" (PDF). In the Frame. The National Library of Australia Magazine. 7 (2): 22–23.
- — (Dec 2015). "Like a Gippsland bushfire". In the Frame. The National Library of Australia Magazine. 7 (4): 18–19.
- — (Mar 2016). "Belgian Day: Burnie, 24 May 1915". In the Frame. The National Library of Australia Magazine. 8 (1): 18–19.
- — (1 April 2017). "Q&A with Peter Stanley". Australian Historical Association Early Career Researchers. Australian Historical Association.
