= Prime Minister's Prize for Australian History =

The Prime Minister's Prize for Australian History was created by the Prime Minister of Australia, John Howard following the Australian History Summit held in Canberra on 17 August 2006. The Summit looked at how the Australian government could strengthen Australian history in the school curriculum. The winner (or winners) receive a gold medallion and a grant worth A$100,000.

The prize is awarded to an individual or a group, for an outstanding publication or body of work that contributes significantly to an understanding of Australian history. The subject of works submitted can include, but are not limited to:

- historical events;
- historical figures (including biographies) and
- work covering a relevant subject.

In 2012, the prize was incorporated into the Prime Minister's Literary Awards.

== Honorees ==
Prime Minister's Prize for Australian History winners and shortlists
Year	Author(s)	Title	Result	Ref.
2007	Les Carlyon	The Great War	Winner	
2007	Peter Cochrane	Colonial Ambition: Foundations of Australian Democracy	Winner	
2007	David Branagan	TW Edgeworth David: A Life	Shortlist	
2007	Josephine Flood	The Original Australians: Story of the Aboriginal People	Shortlist	
2008	Tom Griffiths	Slicing the Silence: Voyaging to Antarctica	Winner	
2008	Robert Kenny	The Lamb Enters the Dreaming: Nathanael Pepper and the Ruptured World	Winner	
2008	John Fitzgerald	Big White Lie: Chinese Australians in White Australia	Shortlist	
2008	Philip Jones	Ochre and Rust: Artefacts and Encounters on Australian Frontiers	Shortlist	
2008	Paul Rudd, Stephen Amezdroz, Tony Wright, Wain Fimeri, and Matthew Thomason	Captain Cook: Obsession and Discovery	Shortlist	
2009	Martin Butler and Bentley Dean	Contact (a documentary film)	Winner	
2009	Various	First Australians	Shortlist	
2009	Robin Gerster	Travels in Atomic Sunshine: Australia and the Occupation of Japan	Shortlist	
2009	Grace Karskens	The Colony: A History of Early Sydney	Shortlist	
2009	Marilyn Lake and Henry Reynolds	Drawing the Global Colour Line	Shortlist	
2010 / 2011	Jim Davidson	A Three-Cornered Life: The Historian W K Hancock	Winner	
2010 / 2011	Peter Stanley	Bad Characters: Sex, Crime, Mutiny and Murder in the Great War	Winner	
2010 / 2011	James Curran and Stuart Ward	The Unknown Nation; Australia After Empire	Shortlist	
2010 / 2011	Paul Daley	Beersheba: A Journey through Australia’s Forgotten War	Shortlist	
2010 / 2011	Kirsten McKenzie	A Swindler's Progress: Nobles and Convicts in the Age of Liberty	Shortlist	
2010 / 2011	Penny Russell	Savage or Civilised? Manners in Colonial Australia	Shortlist	
2012	Bill Gammage	The Biggest Estate on Earth: How Aboriginies Made Australia	Winner	
2012	James Boyce	1835: The Founding of Melbourne and the Conquest of Australia	Shortlist	
2012	Charles Massey	Breaking the Sheep’s Back	Shortlist	
2012	Russell McGregor	Indifferent Inclusion: Aboriginal people and the Australian Nation	Shortlist	
2012	Renegade Films Australia Pty Ltd	Immigration Nation: The Secret History of Us	Shortlist	
2013	Ross McMullin	Farewell, Dear People	Winner	
2013	Frank Bongiorno	The Sex Lives of Australians: A History	Shortlist	
2013	Paul Ham	Sandakan	Shortlist	
2013	Jenny Hocking	Gough Whitlam	Shortlist	
2013	Nicole Moore	The Censor's Library	Shortlist	
2014	Joan Beaumont	Broken Nation: Australians in the Great War	Winner	
2014	Hal G. P. Colebatch	Australia's Secret War: How Unionists Sabotaged our Troops in World War II	Winner	
2014	Mike Carlton	First Victory: 1914	Shortlist	
2014	Michael Pembroke	Arthur Phillip: Sailor, Mercenary, Governor, Spy	Shortlist	
2014	Clare Wright	The Forgotten Rebels of Eureka	Shortlist	
2015	Ross Coulthart	Charles Bean	Winner	
2015	David Horner	The Spy Catchers, Volume 1 of The Official History of ASIO	Winner	
2015	Alan Atkinson	The Europeans in Australia, Volume 3: Nation	Shortlist	
2015	Peter Brune	Descent into Hell	Shortlist	
2015	Anne Henderson	Menzies at War	Shortlist	
2016	Geoffrey Blainey	The Story of Australia's People: The Rise and Fall of Ancient Australia	Winner	
2016	Sam Lipski and Suzanne D. Rutland	Let My People Go: The Untold Story of Australia and the Soviet Jews, 1959–89	Winner	
2016	Peter Monteath and Valerie Munt	Red Professor: The Cold War Life of Fred Rose	Shortlist	
2016	Doug Morrissey	Ned Kelly: A Lawless Life	Shortlist	
2016	Robert Stevenson	The War with Germany, Volume III of the Centenary History of Australia and the Great War	Shortlist	
2017	Elizabeth Tynan	Atomic Thunder: The Maralinga Story	Winner	
2017	Josephine Bastian	A Passion for Exploring New Countries: Matthew Flinders and George Bass	Shortlist	
2017	Neil McDonald	Valiant Truth: The Life of Chester Wilmot, War Correspondent	Shortlist	
2017	John Murphy	Evatt: A Life	Shortlist	
2017	Charlie Ward	A Handful of Sand: The Gurindji Struggle, After the Walk-Off	Shortlist	
2018	John Edwards	John Curtin's War: The Coming of War in The Pacific, and Reinventing Australia, Volume 1	Winner	
2018	Judith Brett	The Enigmatic Mr Deakin	Shortlist	
2018	Paul Irish	Hidden in Plain View: The Aboriginal People of Coastal Sydney	Shortlist	
2018	Jayne Persian	Beautiful Balts: From Displaced Persons to New Australians	Shortlist	
2018	Tim Rowse	Indigenous and Other Australians Since 1901	Shortlist	
2019	Meredith Lake	The Bible in Australia	Winner	
2019	Billy Griffiths	Deep Time Dreaming: Uncovering Ancient Australia	Shortlist	
2019	Anna Haebich	Dancing in Shadows: Histories of Nyungar Performance	Shortlist	
2019	David Kemp	The Land of Dreams: How Australians Won Their Freedom, 1788–1860	Shortlist	
2019	Clare Wright	You Daughters of Freedom: The Australians Who Won the Vote and Inspired the World	Shortlist	
2020	Tiffany Shellam	Meeting the Waylo: Aboriginal Encounters in the Archipelago	Winner	
2020	Judith Brett	From Secret Ballot to Democracy Sausage: How Australia got compulsory voting	Shortlist	
2020	Marilyn Lake	Progressive New World: How Settler Colonialism and Transpacific Exchange Shaped American Reform	Shortlist	
2020	Susan Lawrence and Peter Davies	Sludge: Disaster on Victoria’s Goldfields	Shortlist	
2020	Scott Patterson	The Oarsmen: The Remarkable Story of the Men Who Rowed from the Great War to Peace	Shortlist	
2021	Grace Karskens	People of the River: Lost worlds of early Australia	Winner	
2021	Michael Bennett	Pathfinders: A history of Aboriginal trackers in NSW	Shortlist	
2021	Mark Dunn	The Convict Valley: The Bloody Struggle on Australia's Early Frontier	Shortlist	
2021	Jason M. Gibson	Ceremony Men: Making Ethnography and the Return of the Strehlow Collection	Shortlist	
2021	Amanda Harris	Representing Australian Aboriginal Music and Dance 1930-1970	Shortlist	
2022	Christine Helliwell	Semut: The Untold Story of a Secret Australian Operation in WWII Borneo	Winner	
2022	Sheila Fitzpatrick	White Russians, Red Peril: A Cold War History of Migration to Australia	Shortlist	
2022	Mark McKenna	Return to Uluru	Shortlist	
2022	Deirdre O'Connell	Harlem Nights: The Secret History of Australia's Jazz Age	Shortlist	
2022	Peter Sutton and Keryn Walshe	Farmers or Hunter-Gatherers? The Dark Emu Debate	Shortlist	

== See also ==
- List of history awards
