= Military Historical Society of Australia =

Australian organization

- Founded: 1957
- Type: Historical society
- Location: Garran, Australian Capital Territory
- Region served: Australia
- Website: Homepage

The Military Historical Society of Australia (MHSA) is a voluntary organisation formed in 1957, focused upon promoting research and study of Australia's military history. Administered by a federal council based in the Australian Capital Territory, the society has state and regional branches in all states of Australia, except New South Wales, which split from the organisation in 1968. The society has published a quarterly journal, Sabretache, continuously since mid-1958.

== History ==
Formed on 17 May 1957 in Melbourne, the society was originally known as the "Military Collectors Society". This name was changed in July 1959 to the "Military Research and Collectors Society of Australia", before being changed to its current name in April 1964. These changes reflected the evolution of the society's focus from modelling, uniforms, badges and other collectables towards military history more broadly. The society's first president was Robert Powell, with Alfred Festberg as Secretary and Barry Videon as Treasurer and editor of the society journal.

In 1961, the society began expanding, with the New South Wales branch being established at Punchbowl. This was followed by an Australian Capital Territory (ACT) branch in 1963, a Victorian branch in 1965, and a South Australian branch in 1966. In 1968, two more branches were added in Western Australia and Geelong. The final branches were added in Albury-Wodonga in 1977 and Tasmania in 2011. Of these, though, several have closed: the New South Wales branch split away from the society in 1968, forming the Military Historical Society of New South Wales, while the Albury–Wodonga branch closed in 2012 due to declining membership, and the Geelong branch closed in 2016, with some members forming the Geelong Military Reenactment Group. In 2009, the Victorian branch relocated from Toorak Bowling Club, to the Oakleigh-Carnegie Returned and Services League Club.

The society currently aims to encourage "study and research in military history, customs, traditions, dress, arms, equipment … the promotion of public interest and knowledge in these subjects, and the preservation of historical military objects with particular reference to the armed forces of Australia". Now administered from Garran, in the Australian Capital Territory, it is governed by a constitution and has a federal council consisting of a president, vice president, treasurer and secretary, and as of March 2017 had 311 members across Australia. While many members of the society are ex-service personnel, membership is open to anyone interested in military history, and members range in age "from their 20s to their 80s". Each regional or state branch also has a president, secretary and treasurer, and hold regular meetings throughout the year.

National conferences are biennial, and are hosted by a regional or state branch on rotation. The 2014 conference was held in Maryborough, Queensland, and included presentations looking at the history of HMS Bounty, in association with the Museum of Tropical Queensland. The University of South Australia's Narratives of War research group worked with the society's South Australian branch to plan the 2017 conference.

The activities of the ACT branch have been covered in The Canberra Times since the branch was established. The branch held annual exhibitions throughout this period, which included displays of medals, uniforms, badges, captured war materials, and firearms. In 1988, the branch hosted a talk by Professor Syd Wise focusing on American Civil War battlefields. A symposium was also held the same year, focusing on Australian military history between 1788 and 1988. In June 2000, the branch hosted the society's the biennial conference, focusing on the Boer War, over three days at the Canberra Returned and Services League Club. As well as presentations from several historians, the conference included displays of weapons and uniforms, and a tour of the Australian War Memorial and other memorials along Anzac Parade.

== Presidents and patrons ==
Nigel Webster is the current president, and the society's current patron is retired Lieutenant General Peter Leahy, who succeeded retired Air Marshal Barry Gration.

Past presidents include: Rohan Goyan, Robert Powell, Barry Videon, Alfred Festberg, Warren Perry, John Lyons, Neville Foldi, John Frewen, Ian Barnes, Ian Teague, Hans Zwillenberg, Tan Roberts, Roger Lee, and Robert Morrison.

== Journal ==
Sabretache
- Discipline: Military history
- Language: English
- Edited by: Justin Chadwick

Publication details
- History: 1958–present
- Publisher: Military Historical Society of Australia (Australia)
- Frequency: Quarterly

Standard abbreviations
- ISO 4: Sabretache

Indexing
- ISSN: 0048-8933

Links
- Journal home page

The society is funded by an annual membership subscription, and publishes the quarterly journal Sabretache, subtitled The Journal and Proceedings of the Military Historical Society of Australia. First published in June/July 1958, the journal has been published continually since then. Since 1986, it has been indexed by the Australian Public Affairs Information Service (APAIS), and later the Australian Public Affairs Full Text (APAFT) service with access back to 1994. It includes articles on a diverse range of topics, usually written based on original research, as well as editorials, obituaries, book reviews, letters, and society notices. Contributions to the journal come from the society's members, and from professional historians and authors including Chris Coulthard-Clark (a previous editor), Mark Johnston, Peter Stanley, Graham McKenzie-Smith, Anthony Staunton, and Jeff Hopkins-Weise, as well as retired military personnel such as Gordon Maitland, Ronald Austin, Clem Sargent, and Paul Rosenzweig. The current editor is Justin Chadwick.

Articles from December 2011 can be accessed online through the Informit database, and the journal is held in libraries across Australia, either in hard copy form or electronically. The journal is also held by museums such as the Australian War Memorial, the Auckland Museum, and the Imperial War Museum. WorldCat records that the journal is held in over 400 libraries worldwide.

Past editors include: Barry Videon, John Lyons, James Courtney, Chris Coulthard-Clark, Peter Kelly, Peter Stanley, Barry Clissold, Alan Fraser, Stephen Allen, Elisabeth Topperwien, Anthony Staunton, and Paul Skrebels.

== Other publications ==
In addition to its journal, the society has also been involved with publishing a number of other works since its establishment. WorldCat lists 34 works in 50 different publications, with 778 library holdings worldwide. Some of these works, including those listed in the National Library of Australia catalogue, include:

- Australia's First Naval Fight, November 1914
- To Shoot and Ride: The Australians in the South African War, 1899–1902, by Walter Chamberlain
- The Citizen General Staff: The Australian Intelligence Corps, 1907–1914, by Chris Coulthard-Clark
- Victoria Cross Winners of New Zealand, by Walter Chamberlain
- Australian Army Insignia, 1903–1966, by Alfred Festberg
- But Little Glory: The New South Wales Contingent in Sudan, edited by Peter Stanley
- From Khaki to Blue, by R.J. Brownell
- Gallant and Distinguished Service – Vietnam 1972–1973, by Ian Barnes

In the late 1970s, the society began researching a book on medals awarded to Papua New Guineans, and sought submissions from local residents through the Papua New Guinea Post Courier. The Western Australian branch of the society has a regular newsletter, titled War Diary, that is held in the collection of the State Library of Western Australia, while the Queensland branch, based out of Maryborough, also has a regular newsletter, titled "The Queensland Crusader" which is held by the State Library of Queensland. The Victorian branch's newsletter is titled Despatches and is held by the State Library of Victoria.

In 2017, the society published Fighting on All Fronts, the first volume of its centenary of World War I series. Consisting of 11 articles that had been previously published in various editions of Sabretache, the volume deals with a diverse range of topics covering the period 1916–1917, with a preface from Peter Stanley.
