= Archie Barwick =

Australian farmer and soldier

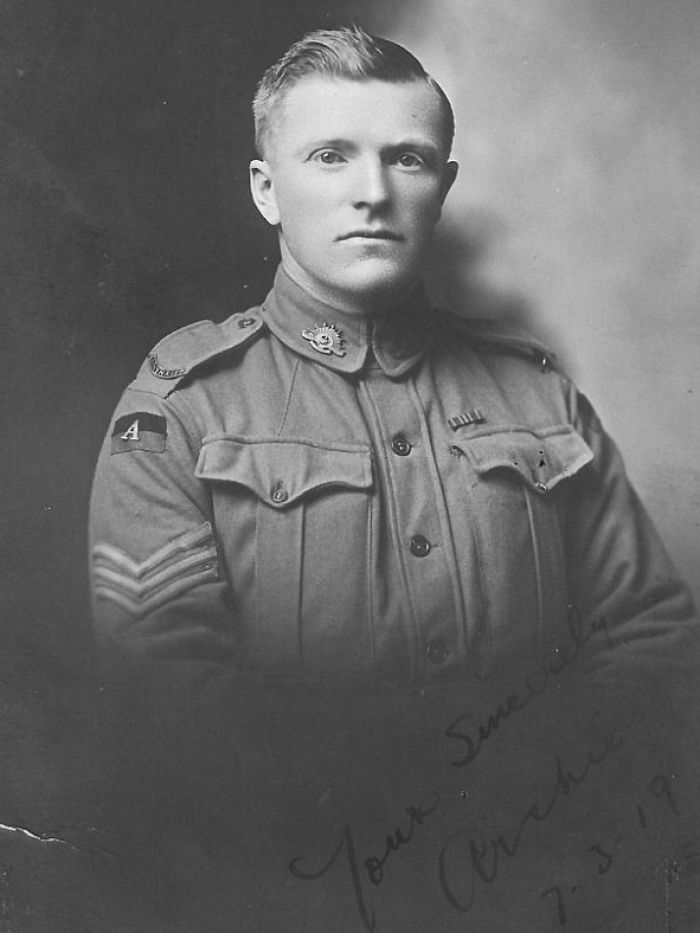
- Barwick in 1919
- Born: 7 March 1890; Colebrook, Tasmania
- Died: 28 January 1966 (aged 75); Uralla, New South Wales
- Military career
- Allegiance: Australia
- Branch: Australian Imperial Force; Volunteer Defence Corps
- Service years: 1914–1919; 1942–1945
- Rank: Lieutenant
- Service number: 914
- Unit: 1st Battalion
- Conflicts: First World War; Gallipoli Campaign; Battle of Sari Bair; Battle of Lone Pine; Western Front; Battle of the Somme; Battle of Pozières; Battle of Passchendaele; Battle of Broodseinde; Battle of Poelcappelle; German spring offensive; Battle of the Lys
- Awards: Croix de Guerre (Belgium)

Archie Albert Barwick (7 March 1890 – 28 January 1966) was an Australian farmer and soldier known for his diaries of the First World War. His set of diaries have been described by military historian Peter Stanley as "one of the most extensive, informative and well written first hand accounts of an Australian soldier's military service in the Great War".

== Early life ==
Barwick was born at Colebrook, Monmouth County (now known as Southern Midlands Council), Tasmania, on 7 March 1890, to George Arthur Sturgeon Barwick and Elizabeth Ann Barwick. He worked from an early age on the family's farm near Hobart, Tasmania. He received an education and was raised in the Anglican Christian faith. As a young man he obtained a farm managers position on Alex Mitchell's Surveyors Creek property near Woolbrook, high in the New England district of New South Wales, raising sheep.

== First World War ==
Archie Barwick enlisted for service in the First World War at Randwick, New South Wales, on the 24 August 1914, just three weeks after the British Empire declared war on the German Empire. He served mostly in the 1st Battalion (aka Sydney Regiment) in C Company. He was enthusiastic about enlisting, recording in his diary that he "threw 2 or 3 somersaults" in celebration. He was measured by the army at 5' 4" height and 152lbs weight, with ruddy complexion, fair hair and blue eyes. He was equipped for the infantry at Randwick Racecourse Camp, and underwent basic training at Kensington Racecourse Camp for seven weeks. Barwick embarked as part of the Australian Imperial Force (AIF), sailing on the steamship HMAT A19 Afric on 18 October 1914 and stopped at Albany, Western Australia, from 25 to 31 October for a gathering of military ships. The first convoy was then formed, comprising 38 transport ships and escorted by four warships, and departed Australia on 1 November. They sailed north across the Indian Ocean and were warned about the presence of enemy warships on 8 November, and then the ships were blacked out at night. As the convoy passed the Cocos Islands the next day, the escort cruiser HMAS Sydney detached. It fought a battle with the German cruiser Emden and destroyed it on 9 November. The convoy stopped at Colombo, British Ceylon (now Sri Lanka), from 15 to 16 November for supplies, and the battle scarred Sydney rejoined them. The convoy continued to Suez, Egypt, and stopped from 1–2 December for military instructions, and then sailed north through the Suez Canal on 3 December and reached Alexandria on 5 December. Barwick and the 1st Battalion disembarked on 9 December 1914. They went by train south to Egypt's capital city of Cairo and set up Mena Camp beneath the pyramids. Barwick, like many soldiers, climbed the Pyramid of Khafre and the Pyramid of Khufu, and considered the limestone capped Khafre to be the more difficult. They underwent military training for three months, which included musketry and attack tactics and co-ordinating with other units. He was joined in C Company of the 1st Battalion by his young brother, Len Barwick, on 3 April 1915, as they were leaving Mena Camp.

Barwick was sent to fight in the Gallipoli campaign in European Turkey in April 1915, where the British aimed to capture the Ottoman Turkish capital of Constantinople (now Istanbul). They were shipped on HMT Minniwaaka from Alexandria on 4 April, and sailed north across the Mediterranean Sea, and stopped at Mudros, Lemnos Island, Greece, from 8–24 April, for a gathering of an invasion armada. They would leave the ship for periods of training, including amphibious landings on Lemnos. The 1st Battalion, part of the 1st Brigade, attached to the 1st Australian Division, all sailed on the night of 24 April to just off Gallipoli. On the journey there, the soldiers were paid with Turkish currency, which Barwick said in his diary showed the confidence of success of the British. He fought in the Landing at Anzac Cove on 25–26 April 1915, where the Australian and New Zealand Army Corps launched an amphibious assault and established a foothold on the Gallipoli peninsula. He fought in the Battle of Sari Bair on 6–10 August and the Battle of Lone Pine. There, his 1st Battalion comrades Len Keysor was awarded the Victoria Cross for quickly throwing back unexploded Turkish bombs on 7 and 8 August, and Captain Alfred Shout was awarded the Victoria Cross for charging down lost trenches throwing bombs on 9 August. Barwick fought in the action of Hill 60, Suvla, on 21–27 August, and survived eight months of the campaign. He was in the second last group to leave Gallipoli, during the successful evacuation of Anzac on 19–20 December. Barwick said it was "one of the most glorious and at the same time disastrous campaigns as Great Britain ever had anything to do with".

Barwick returned to Alexandria on 28 December 1915, and fell sick with septic sores and was separated from his brother Len. He recovered over six weeks in Cairo. He went to the Suez Canal and rejoined his brother Len in the 1st Battalion at Serapeum on 6 March 1916, as they guarded the east bank of the canal in the Sinai Desert. Most of the AIF were transferred as reinforcements to the Western Front in France. The 1st Battalion embarked from Alexandria on 22 March 1916 and sailed west across the Mediterranean Sea and landed at Marseille on 28 March 1916, and went by train north to Flanders. Barwick returned to trench warfare, fighting in Flanders. He was separated from his brother again, when Len contracted an illness on 22 June 1916 and recovered in France. Archie Barwick fought in the Battle of the Somme at Picardy and in the Battle of Pozières on 23 July – 3 September 1916, where he was promoted in the field to corporal on 1 August. His company was involved in the capture of the town of Pozières under a "fearful bombardment" of German shells. He was promoted to sergeant on 26 October, and rejoined by his brother Len in the Battle of Flers–Courcelette on 4–19 November, where Archie was wounded in action on 5 November, but was not evacuated. The next year he was separated from his brother again, when Len transferred to the Anzac Workshops in France on 2 February 1917. Barwick fought in an engagement near Demicourt, Artois, on the Hindenburg Line, and was wounded in action again, with a gunshot through his right shoulder on 8 April 1917. He was admitted to No. 6 General Hospital in Rouen, and made a quick recovery and rejoined the 1st Battalion on 22 April, as it was fighting up to the Hindenburg Line. He fought in the battle of Bullecourt II from 3–17 May, where his 1st Battalion comrade George Howell was awarded the Victoria Cross for running along a parapet of a lost trench throwing bombs down on Germans. After nearly a year of conflict, he was transferred away from the battle on 6 May 1917.

Barwick obtained a position as an instructor for the 1st Australian Training Battalion at Durrington Camp near Salisbury, Wiltshire, England. He undertook training at Tidworth for six weeks and then worked for three months, before returning to France, leaving Southampton for Le Havre on the night of 25 September 1917. He rejoined the 1st Battalion in Belgium on 2 October 1917 and fought in the Battle of Passchendaele. The battalion then fought in the battle of Broodseinde on 4 October, and in the battle of Poelcappelle on 9 October. Later the King of the Belgians recognised his 'conspicuous services rendered'. The next year Barwick fought against the German spring offensive, including in the Battle of the Lys from 9–29 April 1918. He was wounded in action for a third occasion, when an exploding shell inflicted a 'severe' chest wound on 15 April 1918. He was admitted to hospital in Etaples, but his condition was serious and he was transferred to Queens Civil Hospital in Birmingham, England, on 20 April for nine week's treatment. He was discharged to leave in London but caught influenza and was admitted to Harefield Hospital, Middlesex, on 26 June for three week's treatment. He recovered and was transferred to No. 1 Convalescent Unit at Sutton Veny, Wiltshire, on 18 July. After six months of treatment and rehabilitation he obtained Special Leave for 1914 soldiers and went to St Budeux Barracks, Devenport on 16 October. He shipped out of England on 3 December and returned to Australia, landing at Melbourne on 27 January 1919. Barwick was discharged from the AIF as a sergeant after four and a half years service at Hobart on 30 March 1919.

His two brothers, Leonard George Barwick and Norman Stanley Barwick, also served in the war. Len enlisted at Liverpool, New South Wales, on 26 October 1914 and served mostly in the 1st Battalion, alongside Archie. He obtained Special Leave for 1914 soldiers and returned to Australia, landing at Melbourne on 2 December 1918. Stan enlisted at Clermont, Tasmania, on 8 July 1916 and served mostly in the 12th Battalion. After training in England, Stan was sent to the 1st Australian Division Base Depot at Etaples, France, on 11 April 1917, where he was reunited with his brother Archie recovering from his second wound. Stan was killed in action near Remus Wood, Belgium, on 8 October 1917. He was commemorated on the Menin Gate Memorial, Ypres, Belgium.

=== Honours ===
Barwick was awarded the Belgian Croix de Guerre on 19 January 1918, receiving notification on 5 February. His award was published in the London Gazette on 12 July 1918, and in the Commonwealth of Australia Gazette on 27 November 1918. He was presented with his medal in England on 13 September 1918.

Barwick was one of the six Australians whose war experiences were presented in The War That Changed Us, a four-part television documentary series about Australia's involvement in the First World War. He has also featured in projects such as AnzacLive and Anzac360.ac360.

=== Diary ===
Barwick wrote 16 diaries documenting his war service, approximately 400,000 words in total. He tried to keep a daily record of his experiences, however he sometimes wrote entries later or from notes. His diaries are noted for their detailed description of his experiences and for their style, which has been described as similar to the Boys' Own publications.

About 4 oclock Reveille sounded & upon we all jumped & got dressed ... we heard a tremendous roar, up we all rushed, to get a look at what was going on, one of our ships had opened fire on "Gaba Tepe" soon the whole fleet of warships were belting away for all they were worth ... we watched this scene for about 10 minutes, & the order came for every man to get ready to move off ... about 5 or 5.30 we heard a crackle of rifle fire & we knew then that the 3rd Brig. had landed, we then got the order to fill the boats & down we filed on to a destroyer ... she had a few wounded & dead men on her, they were the first we had ever seen, they made no difference to us, & now let me say right here, for it is true as true can be, those of our chaps who had cards, fetched them out & started playing ... the destroyer rushed us over as fast & as far as she could & then the sailors met us with rowing boats we quickly filled these & off we went with shells bursting all around us, we were lucky in our boat for only one man was hit ... we reached the beach at last & we leaped out quick & lively, I must have jumped into a deep place for I went in up to my arm-pits & had to struggle ashore with about 150 lb on my back, & rifle held high over my head to keep it from getting wet. some of our Battn's boats were not so lucky as we were, for one or two of them got smashed right up & everyone was drowned they would sink like a stone with such a weight on them after we got ashore Lieut Payne got us together & we started up for the firing line. I should think it was about 6 oclock then for the sun was just rising. ... we scrambled up the hill for about 200 yards, & then we dumped our packs, & started off at a fair pace for the firing line ... it did seem funny to hear the bullets cutting into the scrub alongside of us as we went along, but no one seemed afraid, & we were laughing & joking as we went along, I don't want you to think I am skiting when you read this, for I will take my oath on it that it is true, I know myself I never felt the slightest fear the first day or two, it was when we began to realize that bullets hurt when they hit you, that we knew what fear was.

— Archie Barwick, Diary entry for 25 April 1915 describing the first landing at Gallipoli

An abridged edition of approximately 133,000 words was published in 2013.

== Post-war life ==
After his return from the war, a welcome party was held for him at Woolbrook, Walcha Shire, New South Wales, on 3 May 1919. He lived for some time in Tasmania before returning to New England.

Barwick married Mona Carroll in 1930. The couple had three children, John, Judy and Tim, and lived on the property Rooya, Abington Creek, near Armidale, New South Wales. He was a justice of the peace.

When invasion by Japan was feared in the Second World War, Barwick was placed in charge of the local Volunteer Defence Corps (VDC). He served as a lieutenant in the VDC from April 1942 to October 1945.

Barwick died on 28 January 1966 at Uralla, New South Wales.

== Works ==
- Barwick, Archie (2013), In great spirits: the WWI diary of Archie Barwick, Sydney South, NSW HarperCollins Publishers, ISBN 978-0-7322-9718-3

== See also ==
- Anzac Day
- List of Australian diarists of World War I
