= The Bible in Australia =

2018 book by Meredith Lake

The Bible in Australia: A Cultural History
- Author: Meredith Lake
- Genre: Non-fiction
- Publisher: NewSouth Books
- Publication date: 1/7/2018
- Publication place: Australia
- Pages: 439
- Awards: Prime Minister's Prize for Australian History
- ISBN: 9781742235714

The Bible in Australia: A Cultural History is a 2018 non-fiction book by Meredith Lake. The book describes the role of the Bible in Australian history. The book received the 2019 Australian History Prize at the New South Wales Premier's History Awards and the 2019 Prime Minister's Prize for Australian History.

== Summary ==
The Bible in Australia is written chronologically, tracing the history of the Bible in Australia from the First Fleet to the twenty-first century. It is structured in four sections: Colonial Foundations, The Great Age of the Bible, Bible and Nation, and A Secular Australia?. The book distinguishes between three roles of the Bible, as a "globalising" force, a "cultural" force, and as a "theological" force. Lake argues that the Bible has played a significant and multifaceted role in shaping the Australian experience for most of the period since European colonisation.

== Reception ==
The book received generally positive reviews. In a review for the Sydney Morning Herald, Michael McGirr described it as an "endlessly fascinating book, told with a rich understanding of the strange ways of the human family". Clare Monagle wrote in Australian Historical Studies that Lake had done "a wonderful job of revealing the ubiquity of the Christian Bible in Australian history". Reviewing the book for The Australian, Roy Williams reserved particular praise for Lake's writing about the role that the Bible has played in the history of race relations in Australia.

Reviewing the book in History Australia, Joanna Cruickshank described it as a "beautifully written book, combining fascinating anecdotes about both well-known and obscure figures of Australian history with thoughtful analysis", but wrote that Lake's distinction between the "globalising", "cultural" and "theological" Bibles was "too unstable to bear close examination". In a review for Australian Book Review, Alan Atkinson described the book as "remarkable", but noted that theology and the impact of the Bible on the Australian intellectual worldview was "not one of the book’s particular strengths".

== Awards ==
Awards for The Bible in Australia
Year	Award	Result	Ref.
2019	New South Wales Premier's History Awards	Winner	
2019	Prime Minister's Prize for Australian History	Winner	
