= Kensington Racecourse, Sydney =

Racecourse in Australia

Coordinates: 33.917046°S 151.228073°E

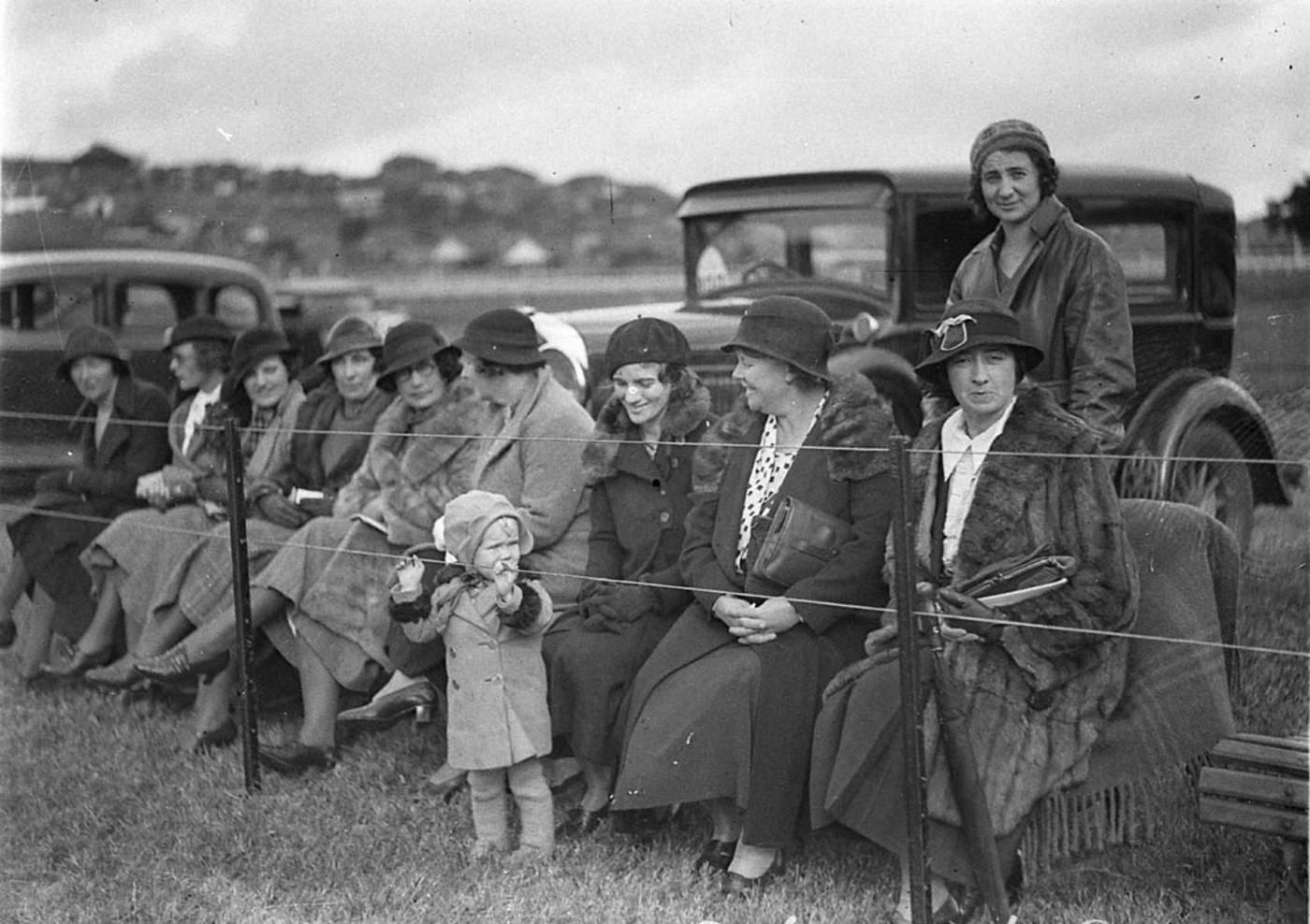
Polo at Kensington Racecourse

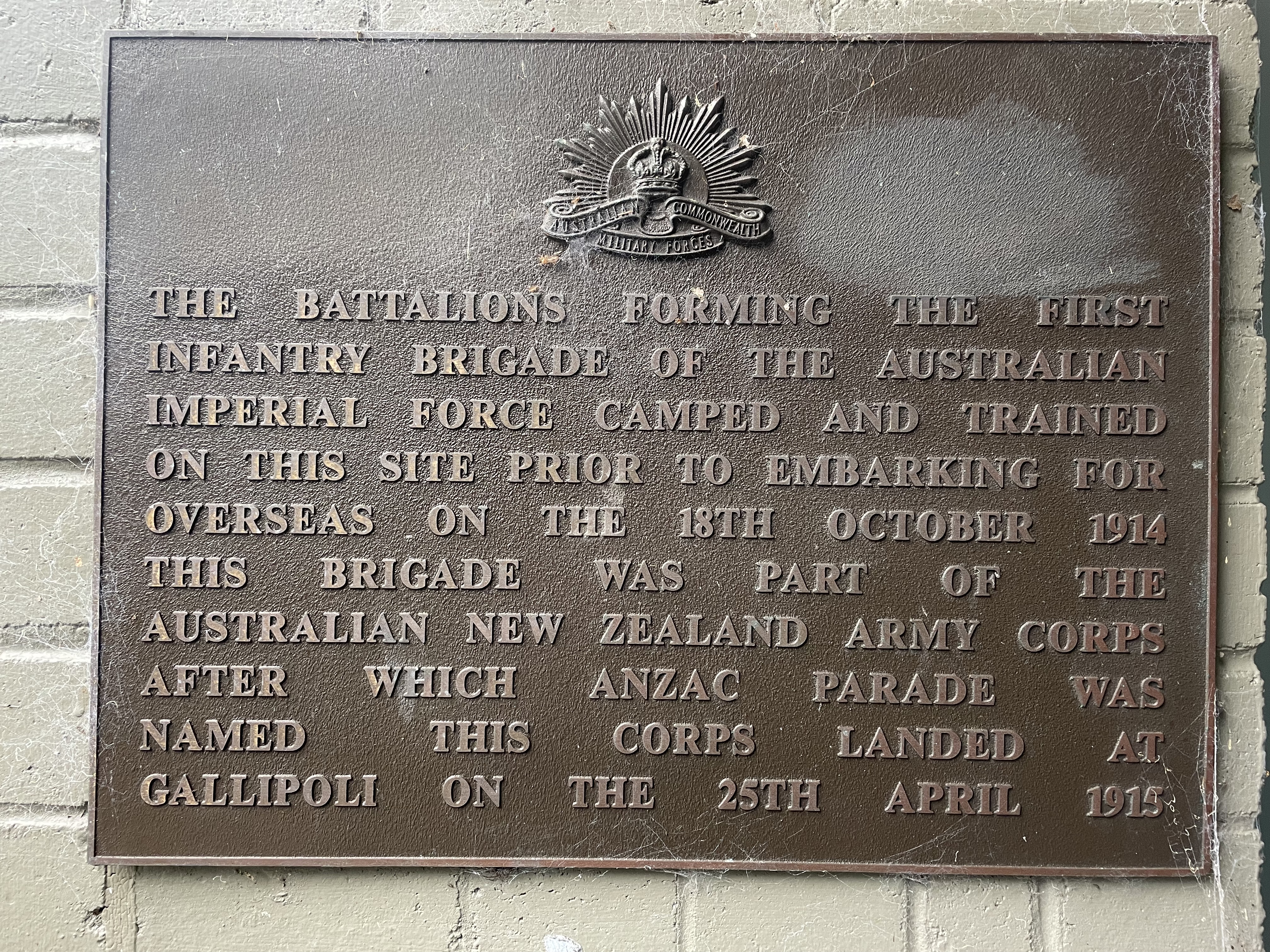
The Memorial linking the Anzac Corps with the University of New South Wales site at Kensington

Kensington racecourse is a now-closed pony racecourse on the current site of the University of New South Wales in the suburb of Kensington, Sydney, Australia. The course was in operation between 1893 and 1942, and during the Boer War and World Wars I and II it was taken over as a military camp. Many of the first Anzacs trained at Kensington Racecourse in 1914 before leaving for Egypt and Gallipoli. An extensive account of the training in late 1914 appears in the diary of Archie Barwick.

A migrant hostel was located on the site in the late 1940s. Construction of the university began in 1951.

The Old Tote building of the racecourse survived and in the 1960s and 1970s was the home of the Old Tote Theatre Company. It is now the Figtree Theatre in the grounds of UNSW.

== 1902 racebook ==
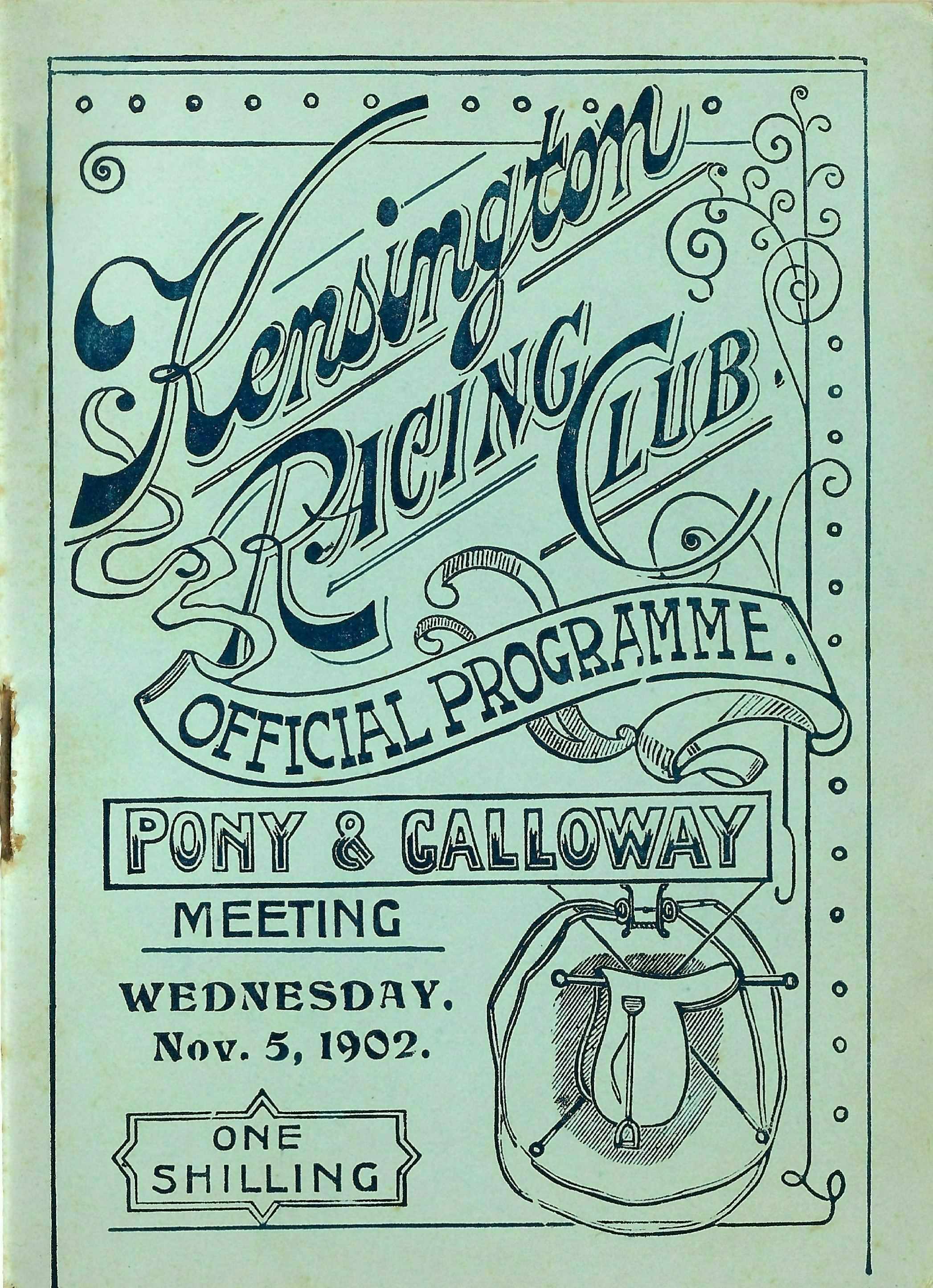
1902 Kensington Race Club racebook front cover

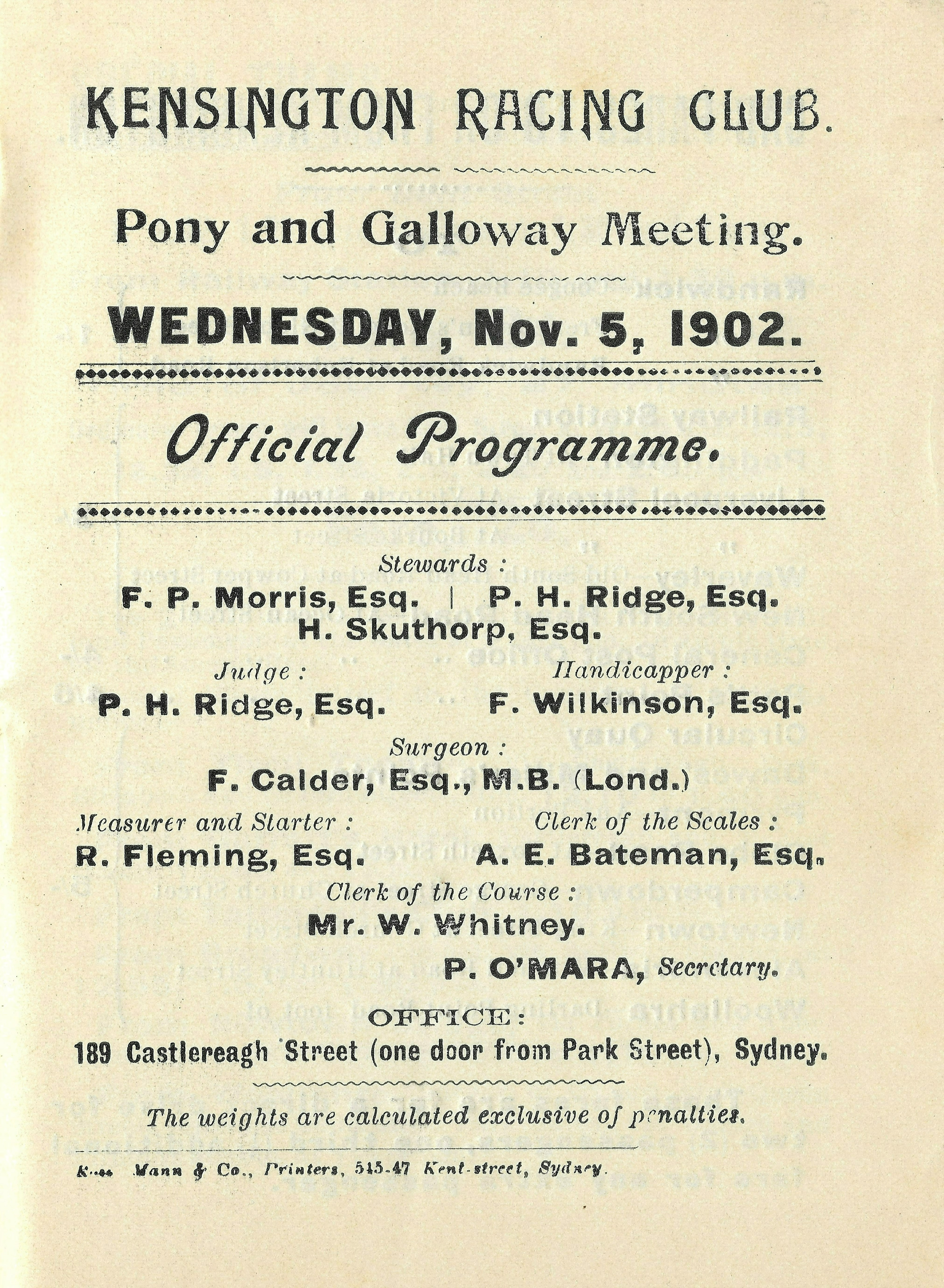
1902 Kensington Race Club raceday officials

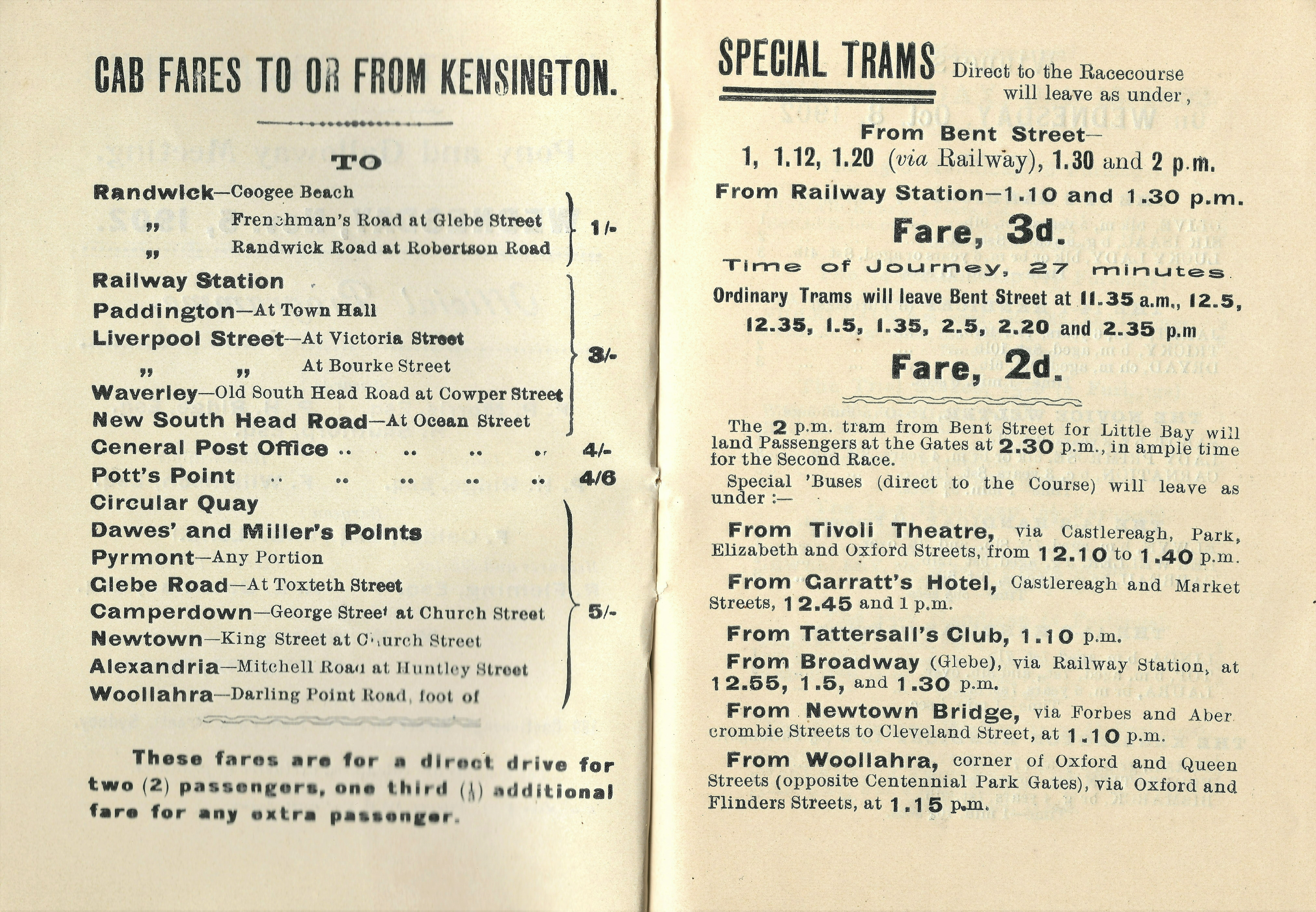
1902 Kensington Race Club transport arrangements

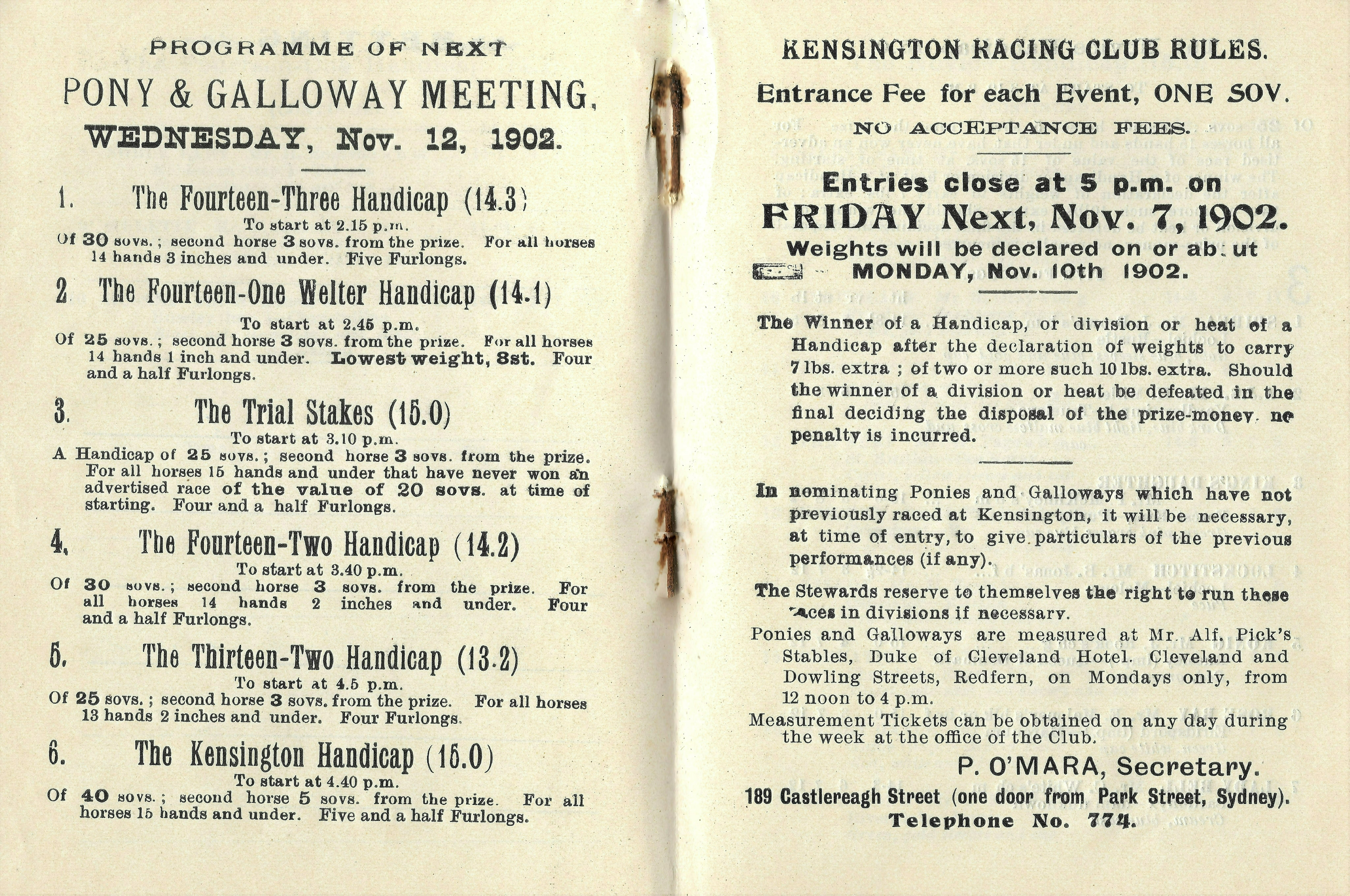
1902 Kensington Race Club rules of racing

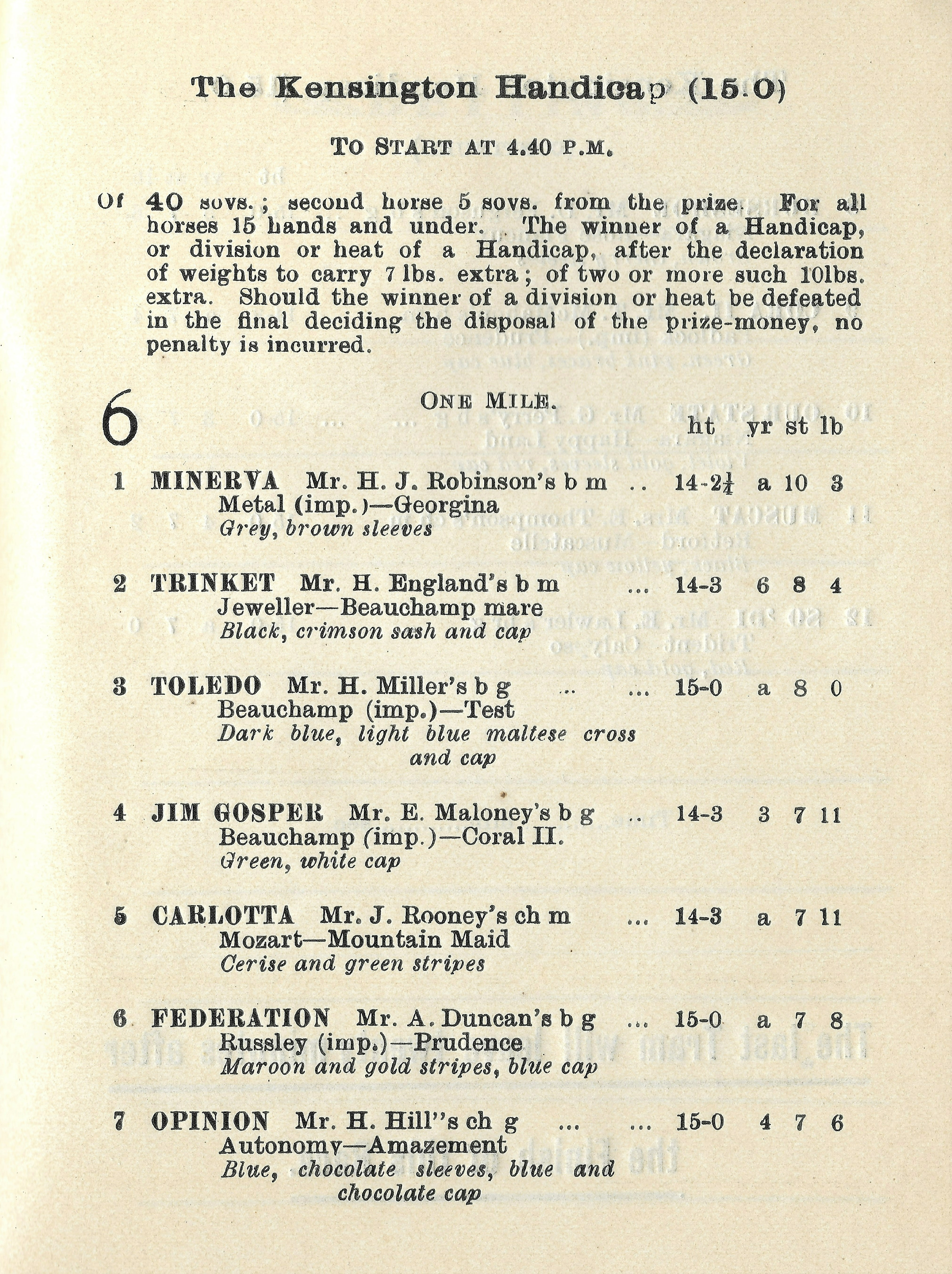
1902 Kensington Handicap showing the winner, Trinket

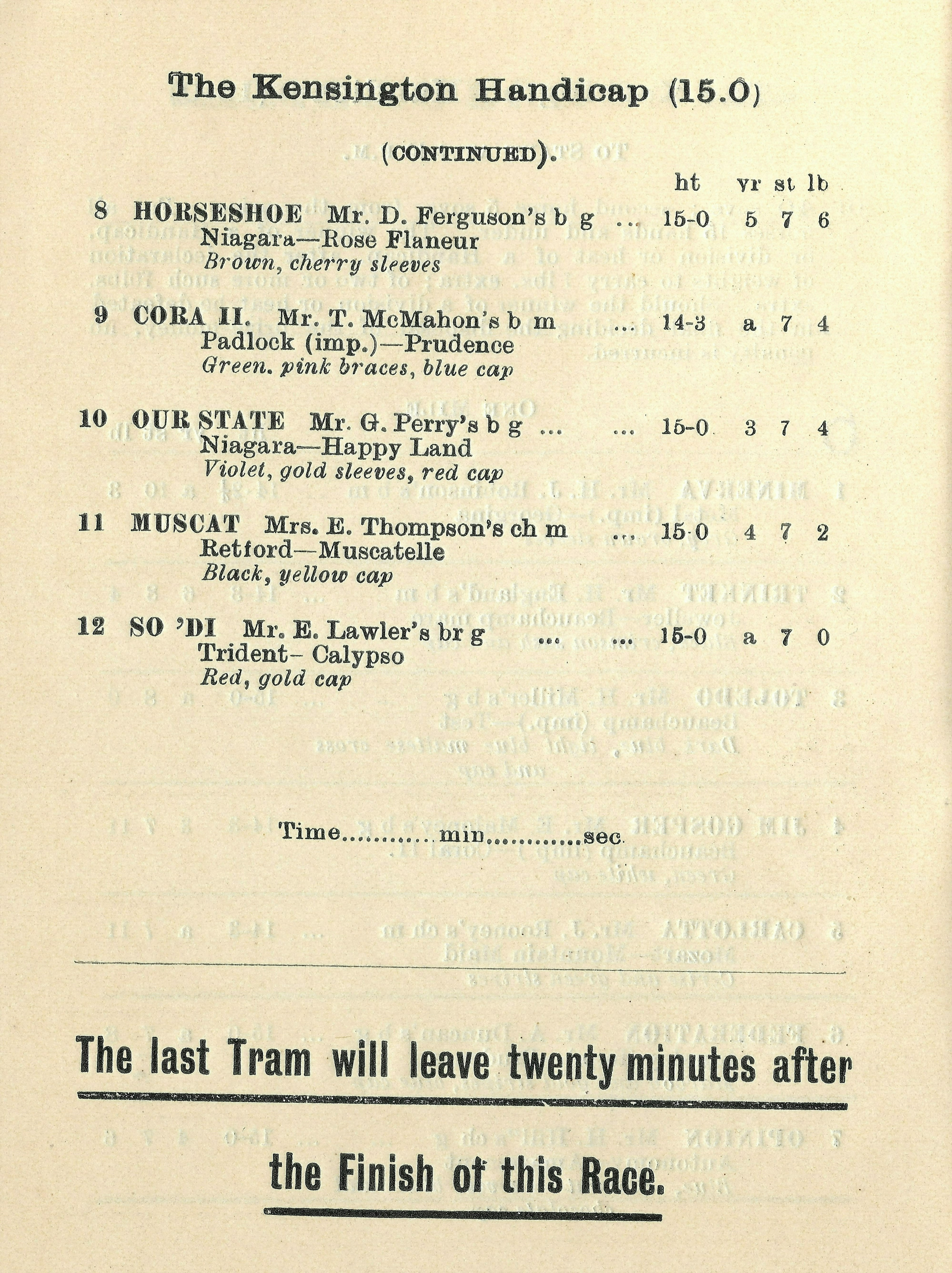
1902 Kensington Handicap starters and results

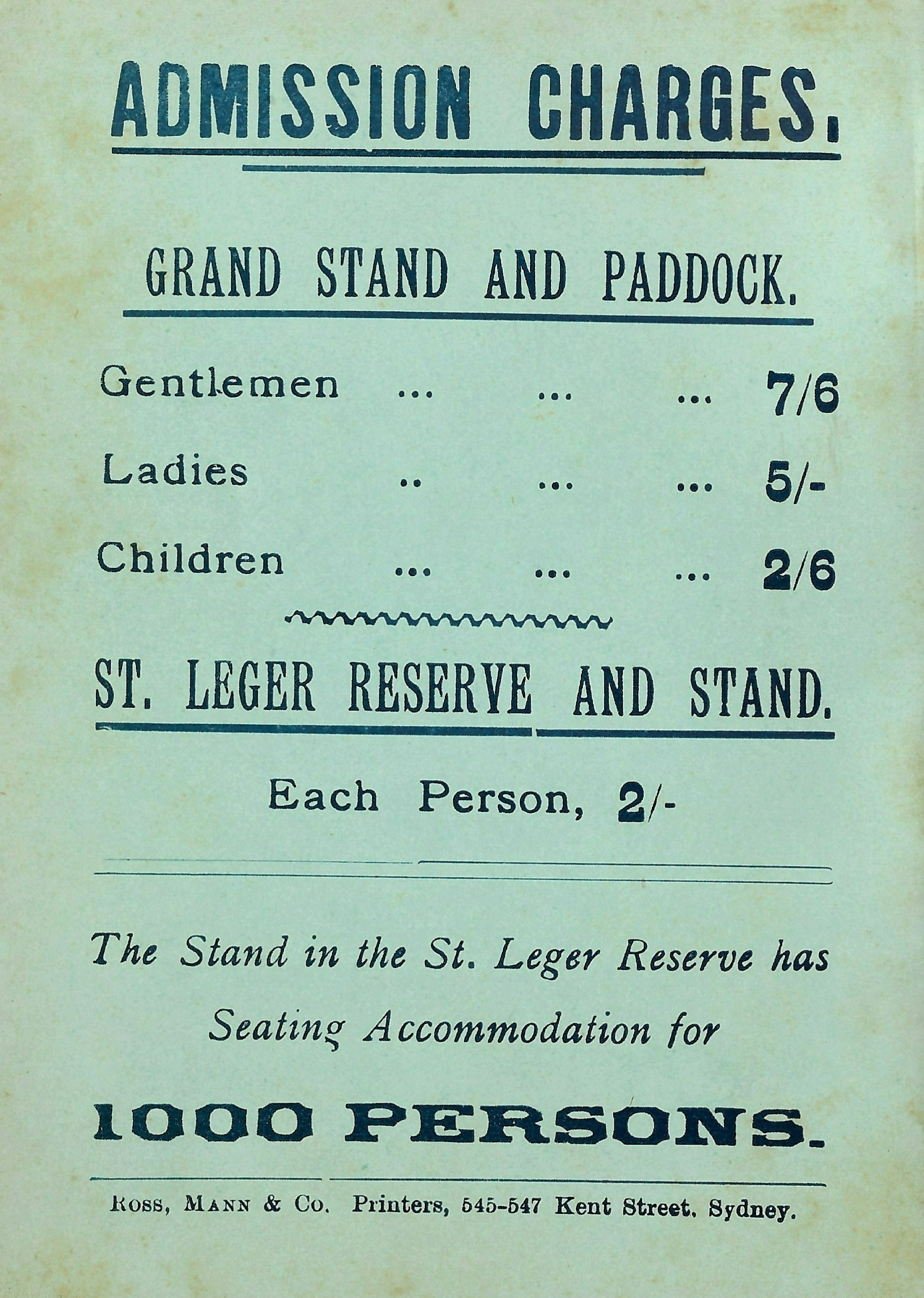
Back cover showing admission charges
