= The War That Changed Us =

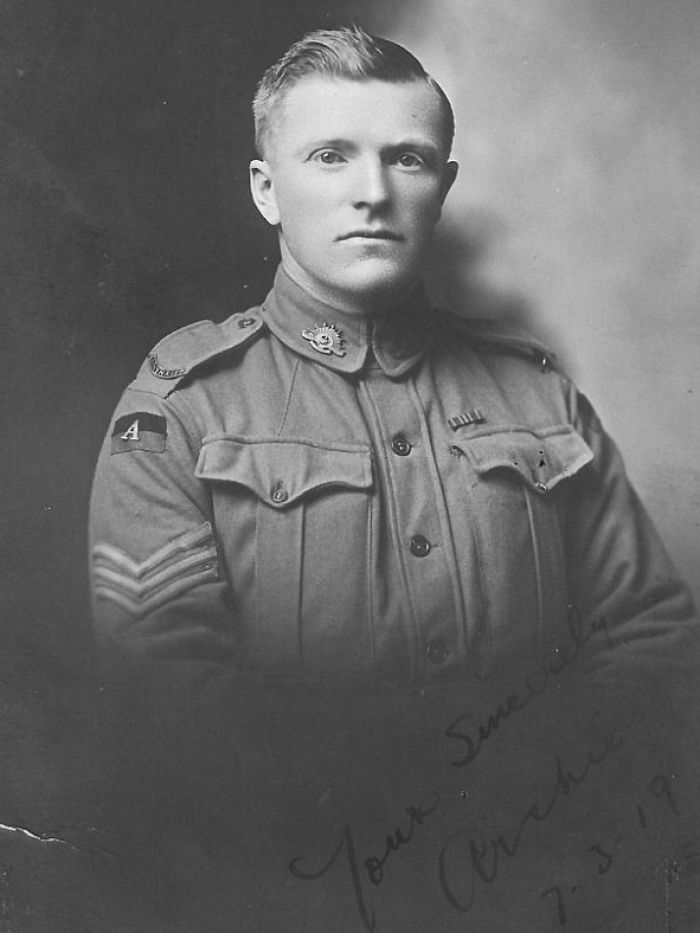
Archie Barwick

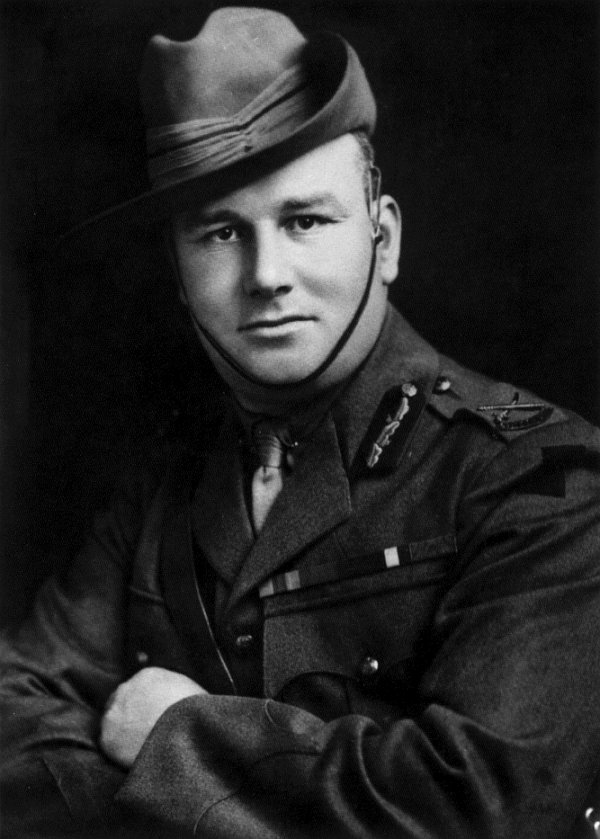
Harold "Pompey" Elliott

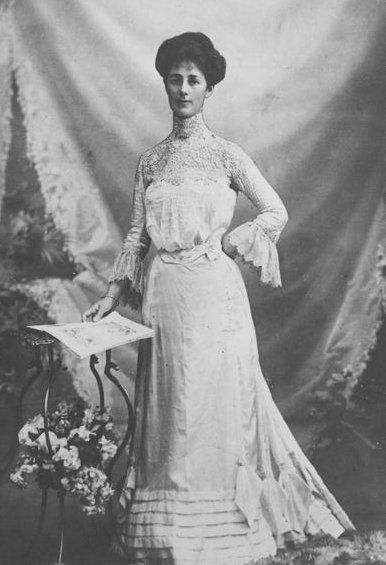
Vida Goldstein

The War That Changed Us is a 4-episode Australian television documentary series presenting the true stories of six Australians in World War I. The series, produced by Electric Pictures, based on an original concept by historian Clare Wright, was first shown by the Australian Broadcasting Corporation on four consecutive Sunday evenings commencing on 19 August 2014. Australia entered World War I in August 1914, one hundred years earlier.

== Characters ==
The series follows the range of experiences of the following real-life people:

- soldier Archie Barwick
- army officer Harold "Pompey" Elliott
- army nurse Kit McNaughton
- Anti-war activist and trade unionist Tom Barker
- Anti-war activist and publisher Vida Goldstein
- Pro-war crusader Eva Hughes

These people were chosen because there was a substantial amount of material they had written. Archie Barwick and Kit McNaughton kept diaries. Pompey Elliott wrote many detailed letters to his wife. The speeches of Tom Barker, Vida Goldstein, and Eva Hughes were widely reported in newspapers. Vida Goldstein also published many opinion pieces.
