= Michael Pembroke =

Australian author and a former Australian judge

Michael Pembroke is an Australian author and former judge.

== Early life and education ==
Pembroke was born the eldest son of Lois and Arthur Pembroke MC in Sydney in 1955. As a child, he travelled between the UK, Australia, and Singapore.

Pembroke studied at Saint Ignatius' College, Riverview and then graduated from the University of Sydney with a Bachelor of Arts degree in 1976 and a Bachelor Laws degree in 1978. He subsequently attained a Master of Laws degree at Cambridge University.

== Career ==
Pembroke became a solicitor in 1978 and was admitted to the bar in 1982. He became a QC in 1995.

Pembroke was a judge of the Supreme Court of New South Wales from 2010 to 2020.

Pembroke's 2013 book Arthur Phillip – Sailor, Mercenary, Governor, Spy was a nominee for the 2014 Prime Minister's Prize for Australian History, and the 2014 Prime Minister's Literary Award.

== Bibliography ==
- Trees of history and romance (2009)
- Arthur Phillip – Sailor, Mercenary, Governor, Spy (2013)
- Korea: where the American century began (2018)
- Play by the rules (2020)
- Silk, silver, opium (2025)
