= Graham McKenzie-Smith =

Australian military historian

Graham Robert McKenzie-Smith, AM is an Australian historian and forester.

== Military historian ==
McKenzie-Smith has written books about Australian Second World War army units and movements. He has been a regular contributor to Sabretache, the journal of the Military Historical Society of Australia.

McKenzie Smith spent some 35 years working on The Unit Guide – a six-volume box set which gives profiles of all 5,700 units that made up the Australian Army in the Second World War.

The trove summary for the set states that:

725,000 Australian men and women joined the Australian Army in World War Two and served in one or more of the 5,700 separate units which were formed in the AIF and AMF... (there were) 5,500 units in the Australian Army during the war (which between them had over 13,700 unit names)...Only 409 (7%) of the units have any published unit history.

Each unit profile covers what is known of the unit's formation, role, organisation, movements, operations and place in the army's hierarchy, including references to the unit's war diary at the Australian War Memorial. The series was published in 2018, and led to the Chief of Army awarding Graham a Gold Level Commendation presented at the Army Museum of Western Australia in Fremantle in November 2018. In the 2020 Australia Day Honours McKenzie-Smith was appointed a Member of the Order of Australia for "significant service to military history preservation, and to forestry".

== Western Australia ==
McKenzie-Smith's recent works include a book about the coastal defences of Albany, Bunbury, and Fremantle in the Second World War, and the Royal Australian Engineers in Western Australia.

== Forester ==
In the 1980s and 1990s McKenzie-Smith was a forester in Western Australia. When resident in Canberra in the mid-1990s, he was CEO of ACT Forests. He was also a member of the ACT Bush Fire Council in 1998–2000.

McKenzie-Smith is currently resident in Perth, Western Australia.

== Sabretache articles ==
- McKenzie Smith, Graham R (October 1997). "Encyclopaedia of the Australian Army, 1939 to 1945". Sabretache. 38 (4): 20–30. ISSN 0048-8933.
- McKenzie-Smith, Graham (March 2010). "The unluckiest unit in the Second AIF?: 2/12th Field Ambulance AAMC". Sabretache. 51 (1): 17–20. ISSN 0048-8933.
- McKenzie-Smith, Graham (December 2011). "13 field squadron: The oldest unit in the Australian army?". Sabretache. 52 (4): 40–46. ISSN 0048-8933.
- McKenzie Smith, Graham R (April 1989). "The numerology of the Second AIF (Infantry) 1939 to 1945". Sabretache. 30 (2): 3–11. ISSN 0048-8933.
- McKenzie-Smith, Graham (March 2012). "The other Dick Smith and the Sio code books". Sabretache. 53 (1): 13–16. ISSN 0048-8933.
- McKenzie-Smith, Graham (March 2015). "The army's grocers and truckies: Understanding the Australian Army Service Corps in WW2". Sabretache. 56 (1): 16–22. ISSN 0048-8933.
- McKenzie-Smith, Graham (December 2016). "'We make 'EM and we break 'EM': Understanding the royal Australian engineers in the Second World War". Sabretache. 57 (4): 43–48. ISSN 0048-8933.
- McKenzie-Smith, Graham (September 2016). "'To the warrior his arms': Understanding the Australian army ordnance corps in World War 2". Sabretache. 57 (3): 13–17. ISSN 0048-8933.
