= Meredith Lake =

Australian historian of religion

- Born: 1980 (age 45–46); Sydney, Australia
- Occupations: Author, historian

Meredith Lake (born 1980) is an Australian author, historian of religion and broadcaster.

== Early life and education ==
Lake grew up in Sydney in a devout Anglican household. She has a PhD from the University of Sydney, exploring religious narratives about land in colonial Australia, with a 2008 thesis titled "'Such Spiritual Acres': Protestantism, the land and the colonisation of Australia 1788–1850".

== Career ==
Lake is an Honorary Associate of the Department of History at University of Sydney. Her 2011 essay on Christianity and colonialism, "Provincialising God: Anglicanism, place, and the colonisation of Australian land", won the Bruce Mansfield Prize for best article in the Journal of Religious History. Her 2013 book Faith in Action: HammondCare is a history of one of Australia's "largest but least known" Christian charities, founded by Reverend Robert Brodribb Hammond whose relief centre in Sydney helped people including "Mr Eternity" Arthur Stace and politician John Hatton.

Lake's 2018 book The Bible in Australia: A Cultural History, which looks at the impact of the Bible on Australia, won the Australian History Prize at the 2019 Prime Minister's Literary Awards, the NSW Premier's History Award, and the Non-Fiction award at the 2020 Adelaide Festival Award for Literature, and was the 2018 Australian Christian Book of the Year and the 2019 Council for the Humanities Arts and Social Sciences Book of the Year. The judges of the Prime Minister's Award said the book "presents, for the first time, a thorough examination of the broad cultural, political, and historical context that Christianity and the Bible have played in Australia since 1788" and called Lake's writing "lively, energetic and highly accessible."

Since January 2019, Lake has presented the ABC Radio National program Soul Search about faith and spirituality. She has also appeared on ABC TV and community radio stations as well as guest-hosting the TV program Compass. In April 2021, she gave the annual May McLeod Lecture at the United Theological College in Sydney.

She was elected an Honorary Fellow of the Australian Academy of the Humanities in 2025.

== Personal life ==
Lake is a Christian and is married with children. Her youngest child was born in 2018, around the same time she completed her book manuscript.

== Publications ==
=== Books ===
- Lake, Meredith (2013). Faith in Action: HammondCare. University of New South Wales Press. ISBN 9781742246161.
- Lake, Meredith (2018). The Bible in Australia: A Cultural History. University of New South Wales Press. ISBN 9781742237213.

=== Articles and chapters ===
- Lake, Meredith (2008). "Salvation and conciliation: First missionary encounters at Sydney Cove". In Amanda Barry; Joanna Cruickshank; Andrew Brown-May (eds.). Evangelists of Empire? Missionaries in Colonial History. University of Melbourne. pp. 87–102.
- Lake, Meredith (2009). "Protestant Christianity and the Colonial Environment: Australia as a Wilderness in the 1830s and 1840s". Journal of Australian Colonial History. 11: 21–44.
- Lake, Meredith (2010). "Samuel Marsden, work and the limits of evangelical humanitarianism". History Australia. 7 (3): 57.1–23. doi:10.2104/ha100057. S2CID 143845554.
- Lake, Meredith (2010). "Faith in crisis: Christian university students in peace and war". Australian Journal of Politics & History. 56 (3): 441–454. doi:10.1111/j.1467-8497.2010.01564.x.
- Lake, Meredith (2011). "Provincialising God: Anglicanism, place, and the colonisation of Australian land". Journal of Religious History. 35 (1): 72–90. doi:10.1111/j.1467-9809.2010.00972.x.
- Lake, Meredith (2017). "The Bible in Australian history and culture". St Mark's Review. 240: 12–33.
- Lake, Meredith (16 April 2018). "Why our Declining Biblical Literacy Matters". The Conversation.
- Lake, Meredith (22 November 2018). "Why we should remember Boorong, Bennelong's third wife, who is buried beside him". The Conversation.
