= Peter Cochrane (historian) =

Australian historian and writer

- Born: 15 April 1950 (age 76); Melbourne, Victoria
- Awards: Fellowship of Australian Writers Award for Nonfiction (1992); Prime Minister's Prize for Australian History (2007); Fellow of the Australian Academy of the Humanities (2013)

Academic background
- Education: La Trobe University (BA [Hons]); University of Adelaide (PhD)
- Thesis: Industrialisation and Dependence: Australia, 1919–1939 (1977)

Academic work
- Institutions: University of Sydney (1982–96); University of Adelaide (1979–80)
- Main interests: Australian history
- Notable works: Simpson and the Donkey (1992); Colonial Ambition (2007)

Peter John Cochrane FAHA (born 15 April 1950) is an Australian historian and writer. In 2007, his book Colonial Ambition: Foundations of Australian Democracy shared the inaugural Prime Minister's Prize for Australian History with Les Carlyon's The Great War.

== Early life and career ==
Cochrane was born in Melbourne in 1950. He completed an honours degree at La Trobe University in 1974 and a doctorate at the University of Adelaide in 1978. After working for a couple of years in the Parliamentary Library of South Australia and as a tutor at the University of Adelaide, he published his first book Industrialisation and Dependence: Australia's Road to Economic Development, 1870–1939 in 1980.

Cochrane worked as a lecturer in history at the University of Sydney between 1982 and 1996. He published Simpson and the Donkey: The Making of a Legend, which won a Fellowship of Australian Writers Award for Nonfiction. Tom Curran criticised Cochrane's version of the story of John Simpson Kirkpatrick and his donkey in a 1996 article in Quadrant.

== Later works ==
Cochrane published two books in 2001, a history of the National Library of Australia and Australians at War a companion book to an Australian Broadcasting Corporation series of the same name.

In 2004, Cochrane published a collection of photos from the First World War called The Great War: 1916–1918. He published a book of photographs from the 1941 Siege of Tobruk in 2005.

Cochrane published Colonial Ambition: Foundations of Australian Democracy, which told the story of the introduction of responsible government to New South Wales. It was funded by the New South Wales Government to mark the 150th anniversary of that event. Colonial Ambition shared the inaugural Prime Minister's Prize for History with Les Carlyon's The Great War.

Cochrane's Best We Forget: The War for White Australia, 1914–18 was published in 2018.

In November 2019 Cochrane's The Making of Martin Sparrow was shortlisted for the Voss Literary Prize.
