= Travels in Atomic Sunshine =

History book by Robin Gerster

Travels in Atomic Sunshine: Australia and the Occupation of Japan
- Author: Robin Gerster
- Language: English
- Publisher: Scribe Publications
- Publication place: Australia
- Pages: 336
- ISBN: 978-1921215346
- Website: Publisher website

Travels in Atomic Sunshine: Australia and the Occupation in Japan is a history book by Robin Gerster dealing with the Australian contribution to the British Commonwealth Occupation Force.
