= Robin Gerster =

Australian author (born 1953)

- Born: 1953 (age 72–73); Melbourne, Victoria
- Awards: The Age Non-Fiction Award (1988); New South Wales Premier's Australian History Prize (2009)

Academic background
- Education: Monash University (BA [Hons], MA, PhD)
- Thesis: Big-noting the Promotion of an Heroic Theme in Australian War Prose (1985)

Academic work
- Institutions: Monash University; University of Tokyo
- Main interests: Cultural histories of war and travel, Japan
- Notable works: Big-noting (1987); Travels in Atomic Sunshine (2008)

Robin Gerster is an Australian author who was born in Melbourne and educated in Melbourne and Sydney. Emeritus Professor in the School of Languages, Literatures, Cultures and Linguistics at Monash University, Gerster has written extensively on the cultural histories of war and travel, and on Western representations of Japan. As a postgraduate, he won the Australian War Memorial's inaugural C.E.W. Bean Scholarship, for a research project on Australian war literature. The PhD thesis that emerged from this research was later published as Big-noting: The Heroic Theme in Australian War Writing, which remains the landmark study in its field. In 1988, it won The Age Book of the Year Award in the non-fiction category. It has been criticised for not discussing women's roles in the war.

In the 1990s he held the Chair in Australian Studies at the University of Tokyo – an experience which led to the "provocative" travel book, Legless in Ginza: Orientating Japan (1999). His book, Travels in Atomic Sunshine: Australia and the Occupation of Japan, won the New South Wales Premier's Prize for Australian History in 2009, and was shortlisted for the Queensland Premier's Non-Fiction Book Award and the Prime Minister's Prize for Australian History. It was republished in a new paperback edition, with an afterword, in 2019. Published in 2020, Hiroshima and Here: Reflections on Australian Atomic Culture is a cultural history of Nuclear Age Australia, focusing on the reverberating impact of the atomic bombings of August 1945, and the complexity of Australian responses to the fact and possibility of nuclear destruction.

== Major works: author ==
- — (1987). Big-noting: The Heroic Theme in Australian War Writing. Carlton, Victoria: Melbourne University Press. ISBN 0522843360.
  - — (1992). Big-noting: The Heroic Theme in Australian War Writing. Revised paperback ed. Carlton, Victoria: Melbourne University Press. ISBN 0522845010.
- —; Bassett, Jan (1991). Seizures of Youth: The Sixties and Australia. South Yarra, Victoria: Hyland House. ISBN 0947062750.
- — (1999). Legless in Ginza: Orientating Japan. Carlton, Victoria: Melbourne University Press. ISBN 052284863X.
- — (2008). Travels in Atomic Sunshine: Australia and the Occupation of Japan. Melbourne: Scribe. ISBN 9781921215346.
  - — (2019). Travels in Atomic Sunshine: Australia and the Occupation of Japan. New paperback ed. with afterword. Melbourne: Scribe. ISBN 9781925849370.
- —; Miles, Melissa (2018). Pacific Exposures: Photography and the Australia–Japan Relationship. Canberra: ANU Press. ISBN 9781760462543.
- _ (2020). Hiroshima and Here: Reflections on Australian Atomic Culture. Lanham, Md: Lexington Books/Rowman and Littlefield. ISBN 978-1-4985-8759-4.

== Major works: editor ==
- —, ed. (1995). Hotel Asia: Australian Literary Travelling to 'the East'. Ringwood, Victoria: Penguin. ISBN 0140245421.
- —; Pierce, Peter, eds. (2004). On the Warpath: An Anthology of Australian Military Travel. Carlton, Victoria: Melbourne University Press. ISBN 0522850871.
- —; de Matos, Christine, eds. (2009). Occupying the "Other": Australia and Military Occupations from Japan to Iraq. Newcastle upon Tyne: Cambridge Scholars Publishing. ISBN 9781443803397.
