= Mark Johnston (historian) =

Australian historian, teacher and author (born 1960)

- Born: 1960 (age 65–66); Hobart, Tasmania

Academic background
- Education: University of Tasmania; University of Melbourne (MA, PhD)
- Thesis: We Can Take It: The Experience and Outlook of Australian Front-line Soldiers in the Second World War (1991)

Academic work
- Institutions: Scotch College, Melbourne
- Main interests: Australian experience of war Operational and unit history
- Website: http://www.markjohnstonhistorian.com/

Mark Robert Johnston (born 1960) is an Australian historian, teacher and author. Johnston was employed as Head of History at Scotch College in Melbourne, ultimately retiring in 2025 with over 10+ years of service. He has written several publications about Australian history.

== Early life and career ==
Johnston was born in Hobart, Tasmania, in 1960. He was educated at Friends' School and the University of Tasmania, before going on to complete a Master of Arts and later a Doctor of Philosophy at the University of Melbourne. He graduated with his doctorate in 1991 and his thesis, entitled "We Can Take It: The Experience and Outlook of Australian Front-line Soldiers in the Second World War", served as the basis for his first book, At the Front Line (1996).

A teacher, Johnston has taught at Scotch College, Melbourne since 1991, was formerly Head of History, Politics and Philosophy, retiring in 2025.

== Bibliography ==
- — (1996). At the Front Line: Experiences of Australian Soldiers in World War II. Cambridge: Cambridge University Press. ISBN 0521523230.
- — (2000). Fighting the Enemy: Australian Soldiers and their Adversaries in World War II. Cambridge: Cambridge University Press. ISBN 0521782228.
- —; Stanley, Peter (2002). Alamein: The Australian Story. Melbourne: Oxford University Press. ISBN 0195516303.
- — (2002). That Magnificent 9th: An Illustrated History of the 9th Australian Division 1940–46. St. Leonards, New South Wales: Allen & Unwin. ISBN 9781865086545.
- — (2005). The Silent 7th: An Illustrated History of the 7th Australian Division 1940–46. Crows Nest, New South Wales: Allen & Unwin. ISBN 1741141915.
- — (2007). The Australian Army in World War II. Illustrated by Carlos Chagas. Oxford: Osprey. ISBN 9781846031236.
- — (2008). The Proud 6th: An Illustrated History of the 6th Australian Division 1939–1946. Port Melbourne: Oxford University Press. ISBN 9780521514118.
- — (2011). Whispering Death: Australian Airmen in the Pacific War. Crows Nest, New South Wales: Allen & Unwin. ISBN 9781741759013.
- — (2013). Anzacs in the Middle East: Australian Soldiers, Their Allies and the Local People in World War II. Port Melbourne: Cambridge University Press. ISBN 9781107030961.
- — (2015). Stretcher-Bearers: Saving Australians from Gallipoli to Kokoda. Melbourne: Cambridge University Press. ISBN 9781107087194.
- — (2018). An Australian Band of Brothers: Don Company, Second 43rd Battalion, 9th Division. Sydney: NewSouth Publishing. ISBN 9781742235721.
