= Clare Wright =

Australian historian, author and broadcaster

Clare Wright OAM
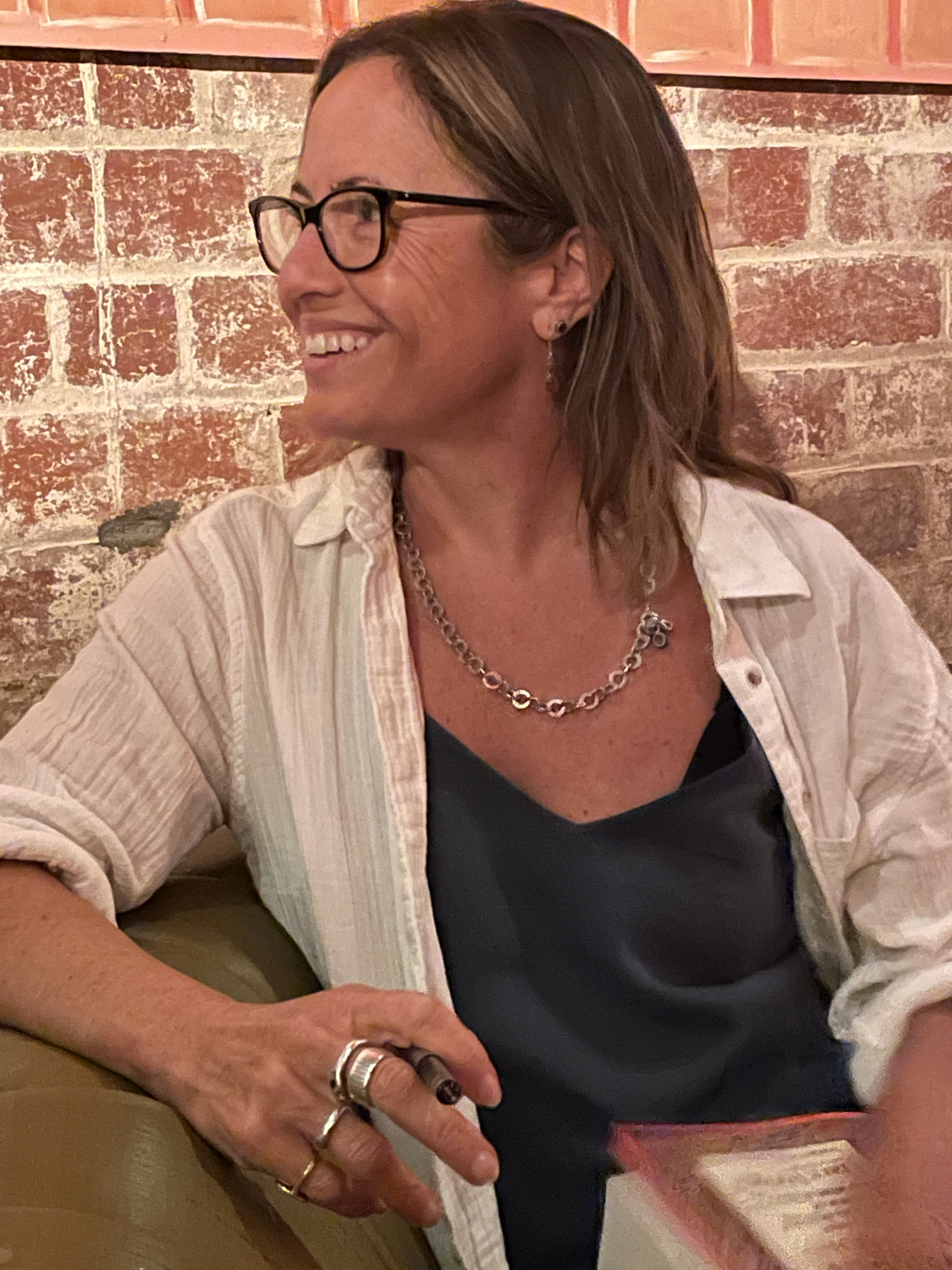
- Wright in May 2025
- Born: 1969 (age 56–57); Ann Arbor, Michigan
- Awards: Serle Award (2002); Max Kelly Medal (2002); Stella Prize (2014); Medal of the Order of Australia (2020)

Academic background
- Education: University of Melbourne (BA, PhD); Monash University (MA)
- Thesis: Beyond the Ladies Lounge: A History of Female Publicans in Victoria, 1875–1945 (2002)

Academic work
- Institutions: La Trobe University
- Notable works: The Forgotten Rebels of Eureka (2013)
- Website: clarewright.com.au

Clare Alice Wright (born 1969) is an Australian historian, author, broadcaster and podcaster. As of November 2025 she is professor of history and professor of public engagement at La Trobe University. She won the 2014 Stella Prize.

== Early life and education ==
Clare Alice Wright was born in Ann Arbor, Michigan, in 1969. She migrated to Australia in 1974 with her mother.

Wright attended Mac.Robertson Girls' High School in Melbourne from 1983 to 1986. She holds a Bachelor of Arts degree (with honours) in history from the University of Melbourne (1991), a Master of Arts degree in public history from Monash University (1993) and a Doctor of Philosophy degree in Australian studies from the University of Melbourne (2002).

== Career ==
Wright was the executive officer of the History Council of Victoria from 2003 to 2004.

=== Academia ===
From 2004 to 2009, Wright was an Australian Research Council postdoctoral research fellow at La Trobe University.

She was an Australian Research Council Future Fellow at La Trobe University from 2014 to 2022, from which time she has been a professor of history and the inaugural professor of public history at the university.

=== Writing ===
Wright is the author of a number of books which have received both critical and popular acclaim.

In her second book, The Forgotten Rebels of Eureka (2013), she describes the events surrounding the Eureka Rebellion and Eureka Stockade, which took place on the Ballarat goldfields in the 1850s, from women's point of view, based on several real historical figures. The book took her 10 years to research and write.

In 2019 she published You Daughters of Freedom: The Australians Who Won the Vote and Inspired the World.

In 2024 Wright published Näku Dhäruk: The Bark Petitions, a detailed account of the events leading up to and following the Yirrkala bark petitions in 1963.

=== Broadcasting ===
As of April 2020, Wright writes and presents Shooting the Past, a history radio series and podcast for ABC Radio National. She started co-hosting the La Trobe University podcast Archive Fever with Yves Rees in 2019. She is an executive producer of Hey History!, the first Australian history podcast designed for use in schools, which was launched in 2024.

Wright created, wrote and presented the ABC television history documentary Utopia Girls and created and co-wrote the ABC television docudrama series The War That Changed Us, which won an ATOM award for best factual program and was nominated for a Logie Award.

== Other activities ==
In 2019, Wright co-founded and has since co-convened A Monument of One's Own, a not-for-profit advocacy group which campaigns for statue equality.

She is a former board director at the Wheeler Centre and a former member of the expert advisory panel for the Australian Republic Movement.

She was on the Independent Advisory Panel of the Albanese government's National Cultural Policy. She co-wrote the policy document's vision statement with Christos Tsiolkas.

In August 2024, Wright was appointed as chair of the council of the National Museum of Australia.

== Honours and awards ==
The Forgotten Rebels of Eureka won the 2014 Stella Prize and the Nib Waverley Library Award, and was shortlisted for many other literary prizes, including for Australian history at the Prime Minister's Literary Awards and the New South Wales Premier's History Awards. It was longlisted for that year's Walkley Book Award.

In 2016, Wright won the Alice Literary Award, presented by the Society for Women Writers, for "distinguished and long-term contribution to literature by an Australian woman".

In 2019, You Daughters of Freedom: The Australians Who Won the Vote and Inspired the World was shortlisted for the Prime Minister's Literary Awards, shortlisted for the Queensland Literary Awards University of Southern Queensland History Book Award, and longlisted for the CHASS Australia Book Prize (an annual prize awarded by the Council for the Humanities, Arts and Social Sciences).

She was awarded the Medal of the Order of Australia in the 2020 Australia Day Honours in recognition of her "service to literature, and to historical research".

Näku Dhäruk: The Bark Petitions won the 2025 Queensland Literary Award for non-fiction and was shortlisted for both the Victorian Premier's Prize for Nonfiction and the Prime Minister's Literary Award for Australian History in that year. In May 2026 it won the Douglas Stewart Prize for Non-Fiction as well as Book of the Year at the NSW Premier's Literary Awards.

== Works ==
- Beyond the Ladies Lounge: Australia's Female Publicans. Carlton, Victoria: Melbourne University Press. 2003. ISBN 9780522850710.
- The Forgotten Rebels of Eureka. Melbourne: Text Publishing. 2013. ISBN 9781922147370.
- We Are the Rebels: The Women and Men Who Made Eureka. Melbourne: Text Publishing. 2016. ISBN 9781922182784.
- You Daughters of Freedom: The Australians Who Won the Vote and Inspired the World. Melbourne: Text Publishing. 2018. ISBN 9781925603934.
- Näku Dhäruk: The Bark Petitions — How the People of Yirrkala Changed the Course of Australian Democracy. Melbourne: Text Publishing. 2024. ISBN 9781922330864.

== Personal life ==
As of 2024, Wright was living in Melbourne. She has three adult children.
