= The Forgotten Rebels of Eureka =

2013 book by Clare Wright

- Author: Clare Wright
- Language: English
- Series: Democracy Trilogy #1
- Subject: Women in the Eureka Stockade
- Genre: Non-fiction
- Publisher: Text Publishing
- Publication date: 23 October 2013
- Publication place: Australia
- Media type: Print
- Pages: 512 pp.
- Awards: 2014 Stella Prize
- ISBN: 9781922182548
- Followed by: You Daughters of Freedom

The Forgotten Rebels of Eureka is a 2013 non-fiction book by historian and author Clare Wright. The book describes the role of women in the Eureka Stockade, an 1854 revolt in Ballarat against the British administration during the Victorian gold rush. The book, which has been described as a work of feminist history, was the recipient of the 2014 Stella Prize. The book is the first installment of Wright's Democracy Trilogy, and was followed by You Daughters of Freedom in 2018 and Naku Dharuk: The Bark Petitions in 2024.

== Publication history ==
The Forgotten Rebels of Eureka was first published by Text Publishing in October 2013 (ISBN 9781922147370). A paperback edition was released in May 2014 (ISBN 9781922182548). The book is the first entry in Wright's Democracy Trilogy and was followed by You Daughters of Freedom, published in 2018, and Naku Dharuk: The Bark Petitions, published in 2024.

In 2018, La Trobe University invested $200,000 in a proposed TV series based on The Forgotten Rebels of Eureka.

== Reception ==
The book received generally positive reviews. In a review for The Conversation, Zora Simic called the book a "career-defining work of scholarship and storytelling" and praised the "power and flair of Wright’s narrative voice". Simic emphasised the importance of Wright's feminist retelling of Australian history, writing that "while Wright’s history offers one of the richest social histories of the goldfields yet, its lasting legacy will be as feminist history". In a review for The Guardian, Alison Bartlett wrote that the book was "part of an ongoing genre of revisionist histories which seek not only to add gender, sexuality, race and class into existing national histories, but to reimagine such narratives as rich social dramas not unlike our own place and time". A review in Australian Book Review called the work an "extraordinary new history", while a review in ABC News wrote that the book "adds to our understanding of the men who were in Ballarat at the time as much as it contributes to our understanding of women's history".

Robyn Annear, reviewing the book in The Monthly, praised Wright's attempt to disrupt one of Australia's founding stories, but criticised the book's tendency to "speculate and fulminate" without adequate historical evidence. Anne Beggs-Sunter, reviewing the book for the journal Labour History, wrote that the book was "based on exemplary research, and enriched by some little-known illustrations", but that it "caters to the popular rather than the academic market". Some reviewers criticised Wright's suggestion that her research was unique, pointing out that the role of women in the Ballarat goldfields had already been studied extensively by other historians.

== Awards ==
Awards for The Forgotten Rebels of Eureka
| Year | Award | Category | Result | Ref. |
|---|---|---|---|---|
| 2014 | New South Wales Premier's History Awards | Australian History | Shortlisted | |
| 2014 | Prime Minister's Literary Awards | Australian History | Shortlisted | |
| 2014 | Queensland Literary Awards | History Book | Shortlisted | |
| 2014 | Stella Prize | — | Won | |
| 2014 | Western Australian Premier's Book Awards | Non-Fiction | Shortlisted | |
| 2014 | Nib Waverley Library Award for Literature | — | Won | |
