= Peter Stanley =

Australian historian

- Born: 28 October 1956 (age 69); Liverpool, England
- Awards: Prime Minister's Prize for Australian History (2011); Fellow of the Australian Academy of the Humanities (2014)

Academic background
- Education: Australian National University
- Thesis: White Mutiny: The Bengal Europeans, 1825–75, A Study in Military Social History (1993)
- Doctoral advisor: Iain McCalman

Academic work
- Institutions: University of New South Wales (2013–); National Museum of Australia (2007–13); Australian War Memorial (1980–07)
- Main interests: Australian military history British Indian military history; British medical history
- Website: http://peterstanley.net/

Peter Alan Stanley FAHA (born 28 October 1956) is an Australian historian and research professor at the University of New South Wales in the former Australian Centre for the Study of Armed Conflict and Society. (The centre, established by Prof. Jeff Grey c. 2011, was euthanised in 2017.) He was Head of the Centre for Historical Research at the National Museum of Australia from 2007–13. Between 1980 and 2007 he was an historian and sometime exhibition curator at the Australian War Memorial, including as head of the Historical Research Section and Principal Historian from 1987. He has written eight books about Australia and the Great War since 2005, and was a joint winner of the Prime Minister's Prize for Australian History in 2011.

== Early life and education ==
Stanley was born in Liverpool, England on 28 October 1956 to Albert Edward Stanley and his wife Marjorie Patricia. The family emigrated to Australia in 1966 and settled in the South Australian city of Whyalla, where Stanley was educated at the local high school. In 1975, he relocated to Canberra to attend the Australian National University (ANU). After graduating with a Bachelor of Arts in 1977, Stanley gained a Graduate Diploma of Education from Canberra College of Advanced Education (now the University of Canberra), and initially embarked on a career as a secondary teacher, a decision he later termed a career "false start". He abandoned teaching to assume a position at the Australian War Memorial in 1980, and returned to ANU to complete a Bachelor of Letters (1984) and a Doctor of Philosophy (1993).

Stanley has been married to Claire Cruickshank since 2009. He has two daughters from a previous marriage to Mary-Ann Capel.

== Historical career ==
Stanley has published over fifty books, mainly in Australian military history, with a strong bent towards social history. He has also written on the military history of British India, and has published a book on British surgery in the final decades of surgery before the introduction of anaesthesia, and on the effects of bushfire on an Australian community. His writing expresses his concern to integrate operational and social approaches within military history and relates in one way or another to the theme of human experience in extreme situations.

His historical ventures also include leading the Memorial's Borneo battlefield tour, 1997; Commentator, ABC television broadcast of Anzac Day march, Sydney, 1998–2001; Historical advisor, television series Australians at War (Beyond Productions, 1999–2001); Commentator, Anzac Day national ceremony, Canberra, 2002–06; Leader, Australian War Memorial-Imperial War Museum Joint Study Tour to Crete and Egypt, Sep 2002; Presenter, Revealing Gallipoli, December Films, Apr 2005; Participant, National Summit on History Education, Canberra, Aug 2006; Commentator, ABC television broadcast national ceremony Anzac Day, Canberra, 2007–10. In 2008 he appeared in the documentaries Monash: the Forgotten Anzac and the 4 Corners report on The Great Great History War and Wain Fimeri's recent Charles Bean's Great War. In 2011 he participated in the Shine/Channel 9 series In Their Footsteps as an historical consultant and an on-screen presenter, and contributed to an episode of Who do you think you are? in 2013.

Stanley has been a major participant in several public debates over history. He strongly contested the idea that there was a "Battle for Australia" in 1942, disagreeing opinions that events in Darwin in 1942 during the Second World War represented Japan's intention to invade Australia. He argues that the wartime slogan of a 'battle for Australia', used by John Curtin in February 1942 in anticipating invasion by Japan, was taken up in the mid-1990s and applied unjustifiably. These ideas he has developed in his 2008 book Invading Australia. As President of 'Honest History', he has criticised the excesses of the centenary of the Great War and the return toward 'Anzackery' in Australian commemoration.

In his work at the National Museum of Australia Stanley wrote a book about the effects of the 2009 bushfires on a small rural community in Victoria, Black Saturday at Steels Creek (published in 2013 by Scribe Publications).

Stanley also writes as a freelance author. One of his most recent military history books, surveying the Australian experience of the Great War, is told entirely through the lives and words of people called Smith or Schmidt – Digger Smith and Australia's Great War published by Murdoch/Pier 9 in October 2011. Stanley published Lost Boys of Anzac with NewSouth in 2014, and Die in battle: Do not Despair: Indians on Gallipoli, 1915 with Helion (UK) in 2015. He edited A Welch Calypso, Tom Stevens's memoir of his time in the West Indies in the early 1950s, also for Helion.

Stanley writes historical fiction. His novel 'The Weight of Light', set in the islands in 1945 was accepted by Pandanus Press in 2014 – just before the publisher failed. Simpson's Donkey, a fictional book for children, was published by Murdoch/Pier 9 in 2011. The first novel in his Mansergh series, following the exploits of Sergeant Nelson Mansergh of the Bengal Artillery, The Cunning Man (set in the first Anglo-Sikh War), was published by Bobbie Graham in 2014. Five further volumes, following Mansergh through to the First Burmese War, have been self-published by Two Dogs Leaping Press: Alienation and The Devil's Uncle in 2020, and The Weight of Light, On Private Affairs, and Golden Pagoda in 2022. Four further volumes to round out the series will be issued as e-books only.

In 2001, Stanley criticised the ABC Television mini-series Changi, claiming that the program was an in-accurate and misleading portrayal of the Second World War POW camp in Singapore.

== Bibliography ==
Starting in 1977—and as at 2019—Stanley has written (or co-written) 27 books and edited eight others, published two novels and co-authored a booklet, and composed at least 46 chapters in books and anthologies, more than 60 journal articles, seven encyclopaedia entries and numerous papers. In 2011, his book Bad Characters: Sex, Crime, Mutiny, Murder and the Australian Imperial Force (2010) was the joint winner of the Prime Minister's Prize for Australian History.
