= List of antiquarian societies =

A list of antiquarian societies.

An antiquarian society is a learned society or professional association for antiquarians, people who study history with particular attention to ancient artifacts, archaeological and historic sites, and/or historic archives and manuscripts.

== Australia ==
=== National societies ===
- Australian Age of Dinosaurs
- Australian Antiquarian Horological Society
- Australian Association for Jewish Studies
- Australian Catholic Historical Society
- Australian Computer Museum Society
- Australian Forest History Society
- Australian Garden History Society
- Australian Jewish Genealogical Society
- Australian Jewish Historical Society
- Australian Society for Sports History
- Australian Society for the Study of Labour History
- Australasian Federation of Family History Organisations
- Federation of Australian Historical Societies
- Military Historical Society of Australia
- National Trust of Australia
- Naval Historical Society of Australia
- Royal Australian Historical Society
- Society of Australian Genealogists

=== Regional and local societies ===
- Cairns Historical Society
- Kilcoy District Historical Society
- National Trust of Queensland
- Queensland Family History Society
- Queensland Women's Historical Association
- Royal Historical Society of Queensland

== United Kingdom ==
=== National societies ===
- Antiquarian Horological Society
- Cambrian Archaeological Association, which covers Wales and the Marches of Wales.
- Council for British Archaeology or CBA
- Royal Society of Antiquaries of Ireland
- Society of Antiquaries of London
- Society of Antiquaries of Scotland

=== Regional and local societies ===
- Anglesey Antiquarian Society
- Cambridge Antiquarian Society
- Clifton Antiquarian Club
- Lancashire and Cheshire Antiquarian Society
- Orkney Antiquarian Society
- Society of Antiquaries of Newcastle upon Tyne
- Society for Lincolnshire History and Archaeology
- Spalding Gentlemen's Society

== United States ==
=== National societies ===
- American Antiquarian Society

=== Regional and local societies ===
- Plymouth Antiquarian Society

== See also ==
- Antiquarians
- Historical societies
- Text publication society
