= History of Tasmania =

The history of Tasmania begins at the end of the Last Glacial Period (approximately 12,000 years ago) when it is believed that the island was joined to the Australian mainland. Little is known of the human history of the island until the British colonisation of Tasmania in the 19th century.

== Indigenous people ==
Tasmania was inhabited by an Indigenous population, the Aboriginal Tasmanians, and evidence indicates their presence in the territory, later to become an island, at least 35,000 years ago. At the time of the British occupation and colonisation in 1803 the Indigenous population was estimated at between 3,000 and 10,000. Historian Lyndall Ryan's analysis of population studies led her to conclude that there were about 7,000 spread throughout the island's nine nations; Nicholas Clements, citing research by N.J.B. Plomley and Rhys Jones, settled on a figure of 3,000 to 4,000.

The combination of the so-called Black War, internecine conflict and, from the late 1820s, the spread of infectious diseases to which they had no immunity, reduced the population to about 300 by 1833. Almost all of the Indigenous population was relocated to Flinders Island by George Augustus Robinson. Until the 1970s, most people thought that the last surviving Tasmanian Aboriginal person was Truganini, who died in 1876. However, this "extinction" was a myth, as documented by Lyndall Ryan in 1991.

== European arrival ==
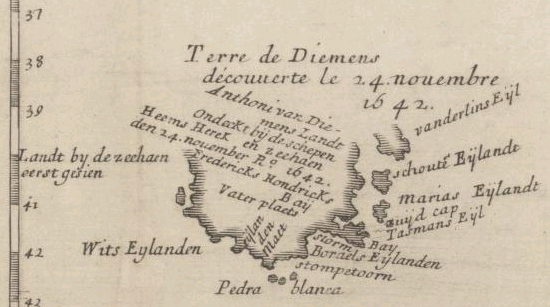
Seventeenth century map of Tasmania, showing the parts seen by Tasman.

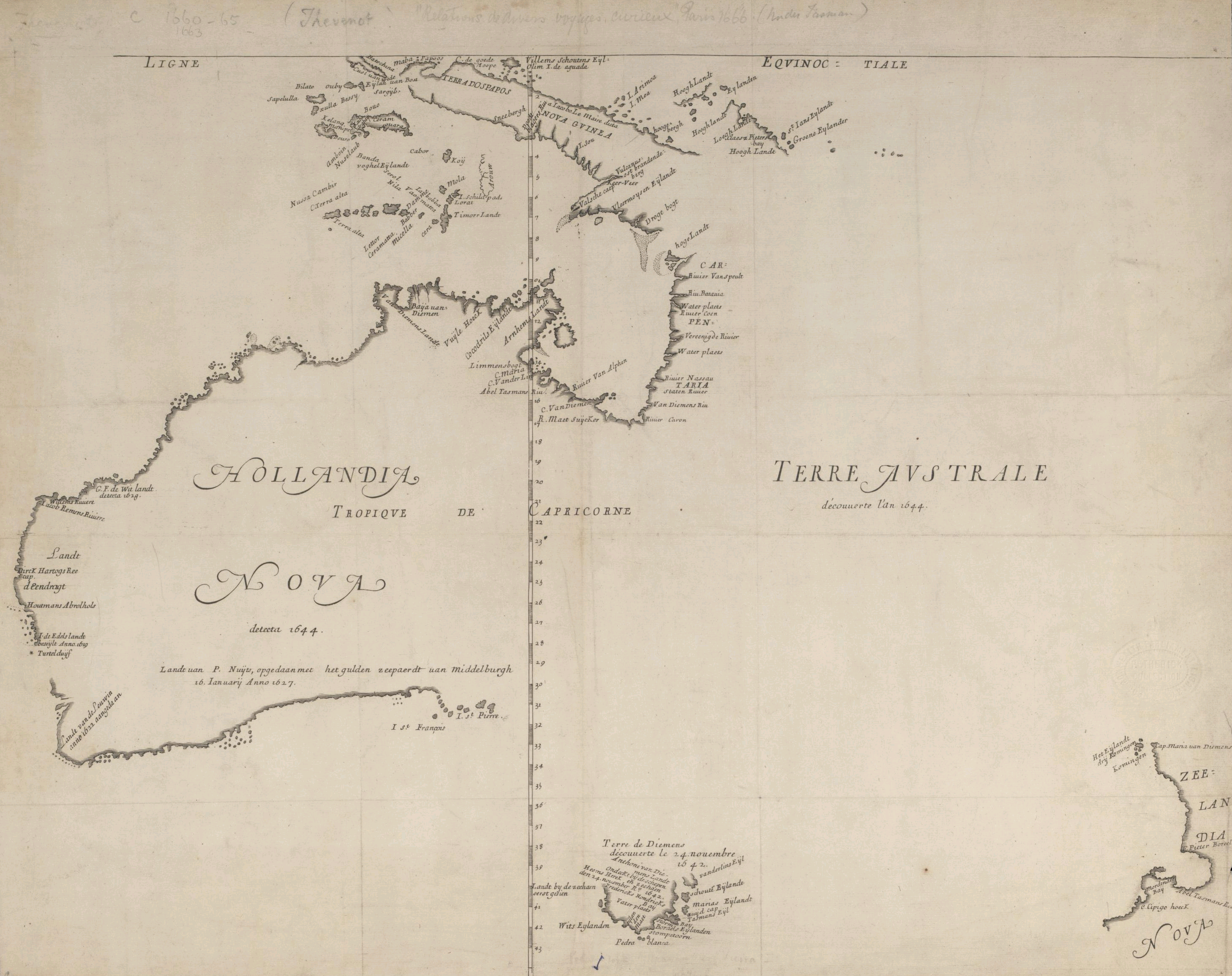
Melchisedech Thevenot (1620?–1692): Map of New Holland 1644, based on a map by the Dutch cartographer Joan Blaeu.

Despite mapping parts of the southern Australian coast in 1627, the Dutch did not establish permanent settlements on the continent, leaving an opportunity for the British to later assert their presence in the region. The first reported sighting of Tasmania by a European was on 24 November 1642 by the Dutch explorer Abel Tasman, who named the island Anthoonij van Diemenslandt, after his sponsor, the Governor of the Dutch East Indies. The name was later shortened to Van Diemen's Land by the British. In 1772, a French expedition led by Marc-Joseph Marion du Fresne landed on the island. Captain James Cook also sighted the island in 1777, and numerous other European seafarers made landfalls, adding a colourful array to the names of topographical features.

The first settlement was by the British at Risdon Cove on the eastern bank of the Derwent estuary in 1803, by a small party sent from Sydney, under Lt. John Bowen. An alternative settlement was established by Capt. David Collins 5 km to the south in 1804 in Sullivans Cove on the western side of the Derwent, where fresh water was more plentiful. The latter settlement became known as Hobart Town, later shortened to Hobart, after the British Colonial Secretary of the time, Lord Hobart. The settlement at Risdon was later abandoned.

The early settlers were mostly convicts and their military guards, with the task of developing agriculture and other industries. Numerous other convict settlements were made in Van Diemens Land, including secondary prisons, such as the particularly harsh penal colonies at Port Arthur in the south-east and Macquarie Harbour on the West Coast. The Aboriginal resistance to this invasion was so strong, that troops were deployed across much of Tasmania to drive the Aboriginal people into captivity on nearby islands.

== Timeline ==
=== Pre-1800 ===
- Date unknown (BC): Mouheneener band of South-East Tasmanian Aboriginal peoples settle in what is now the Hobart area
- 1642: Abel Tasman, of the Dutch East India Company, becomes first European to sight Tasmanian mainland; he names it Van Diemen's Land after fellow Dutch East Indies (now Indonesia) Governor-General Anthony van Diemen
- 1792: Captain William Bligh anchors in Adventure Bay for a second time and names Table Mountain (now kunanyi/Mount Wellington)
- 1793: French explorer Bruni d'Entrecasteaux surveys Derwent, naming it Rivière du Nord
- 1793: John Hayes, of British East India Company, unaware of the French visit, sails up the river, which he names Derwent
- 1798: Explorers George Bass and Matthew Flinders visit Derwent as part of circumnavigation of Van Diemen's Land; Bass climbs at least part of Mount Wellington (then known as Table Mountain) on Christmas Day
- 1798: Adventure Bay became the site of a whaling station, then later on a Timber station.

=== 1800–1809 ===
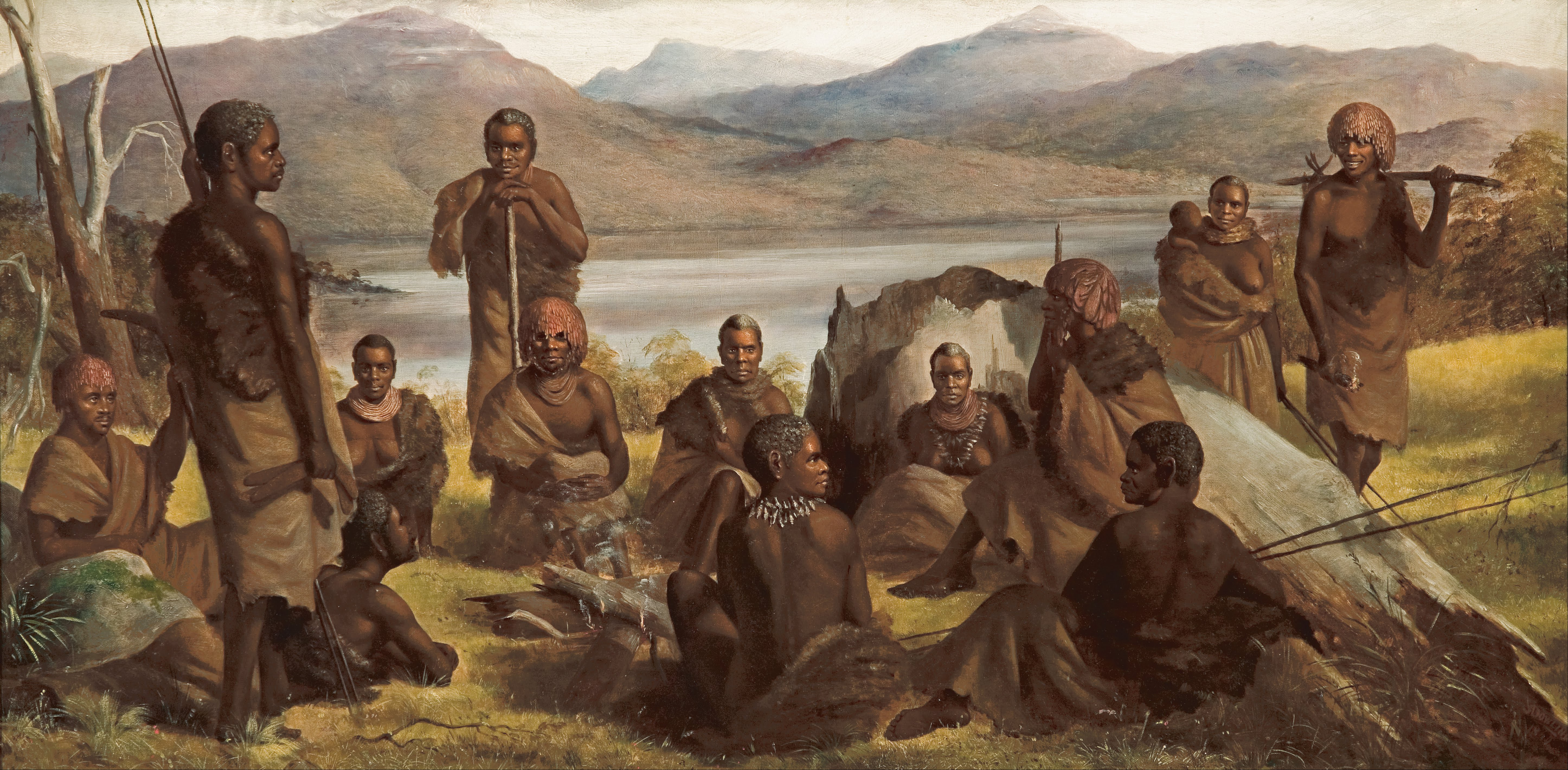
Group of natives of Tasmania

- 1802: French explorer Nicolas Baudin surveys Derwent during month-long visit to South-East Tasmania, on which his party makes extensive notes on Aboriginal people, plants and animals.
- 1803: Lieutenant John Bowen's 49-member party, with the ships Lady Nelson and Albion, starts first British settlement of Tasmania at Risdon Cove, naming it Hobart.
- 1804: Lieutenant-Colonel David Collins' 262-member party lands at Sullivans Cove in February; the settlement, which becomes known as Hobart Town, grows to 433 with arrival in June of rest of his Port Phillip party.
- 1804: Soldiers temporarily refuse guard duties at Risdon amid fears of convict rebellion.
- 1804: Aboriginal people killed in Risdon affray and settlement there abandoned.
- 1804: Church of England clergyman Robert Knopwood conducts first divine service at Sullivans Cove.
- 1804: Hobart's first cemetery opens, later St David's Park.
- 1804: Colonel William Paterson establishes Port Dalrymple (Tamar River) settlement, first at George Town, then at York Town on river's western side.
- 1805: After supply ships fail to arrive on time, famine forces David Collins to cut rations by one-third
- 1805: Collins leaves tent home to take up residence in first Government House, a wooden cottage.
- 1805: Harbourmaster William Collins establishes Australia's first whaling station at Ralphs Bay.
- 1805: First land grants include 10 acres (40,000 m^{2}) to Robert Knopwood
- 1806: Colonel William Paterson begins transfer of York Town settlement to site of modern Launceston
- 1807: First Norfolk Island settlers arrive in Hobart in the Lady Nelson and settle at New Norfolk
- 1807: Lieutenant Thomas Laycock leads five-man party on first overland journey from Launceston to Hobart, taking nine days, mainly to seek supplies for the northern settlement.
- 1809: Deposed New South Wales Governor William Bligh arrives in Hobart and temporarily disrupts David Collins' authority as lieutenant-governor.
- 1809: Floods in Derwent

=== 1810–1819 ===
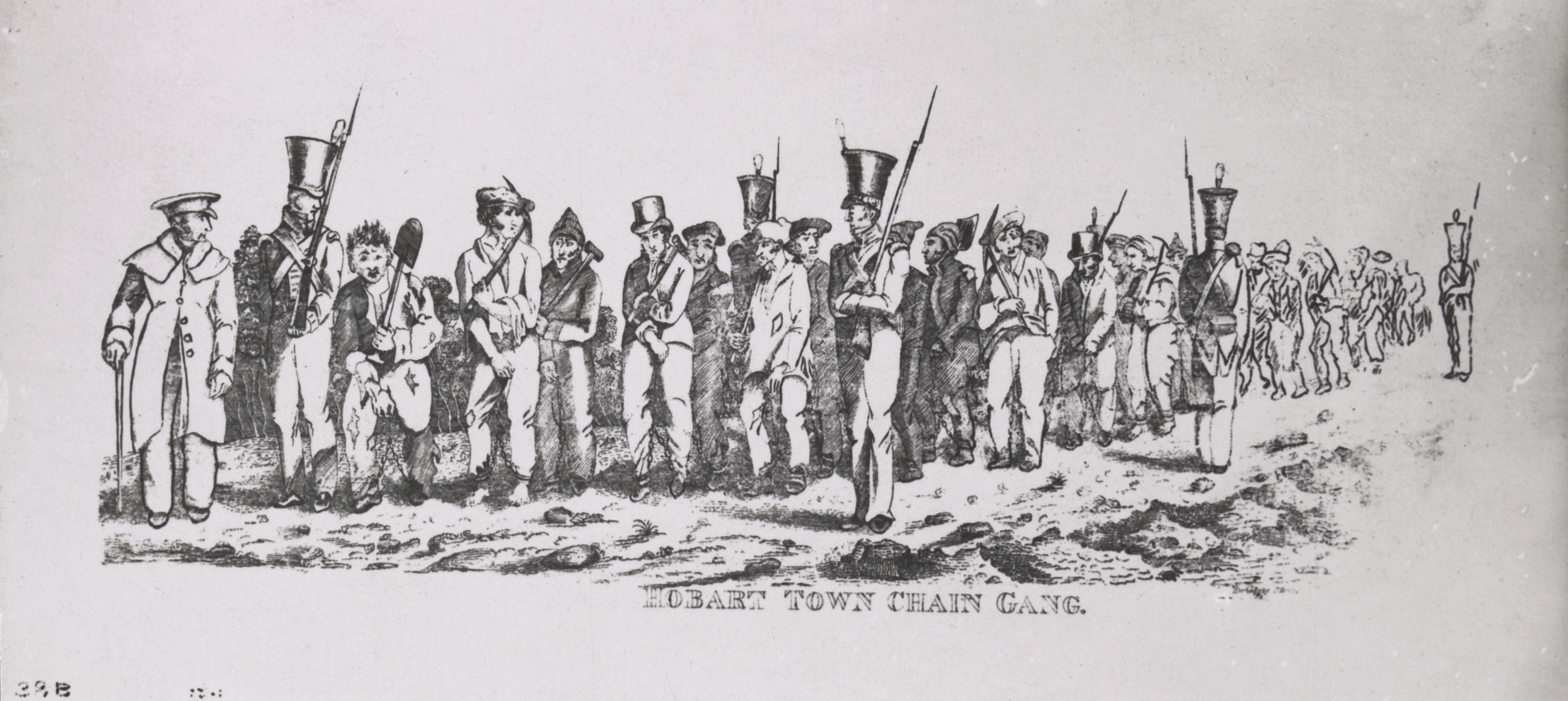
Hobart Town chain gang

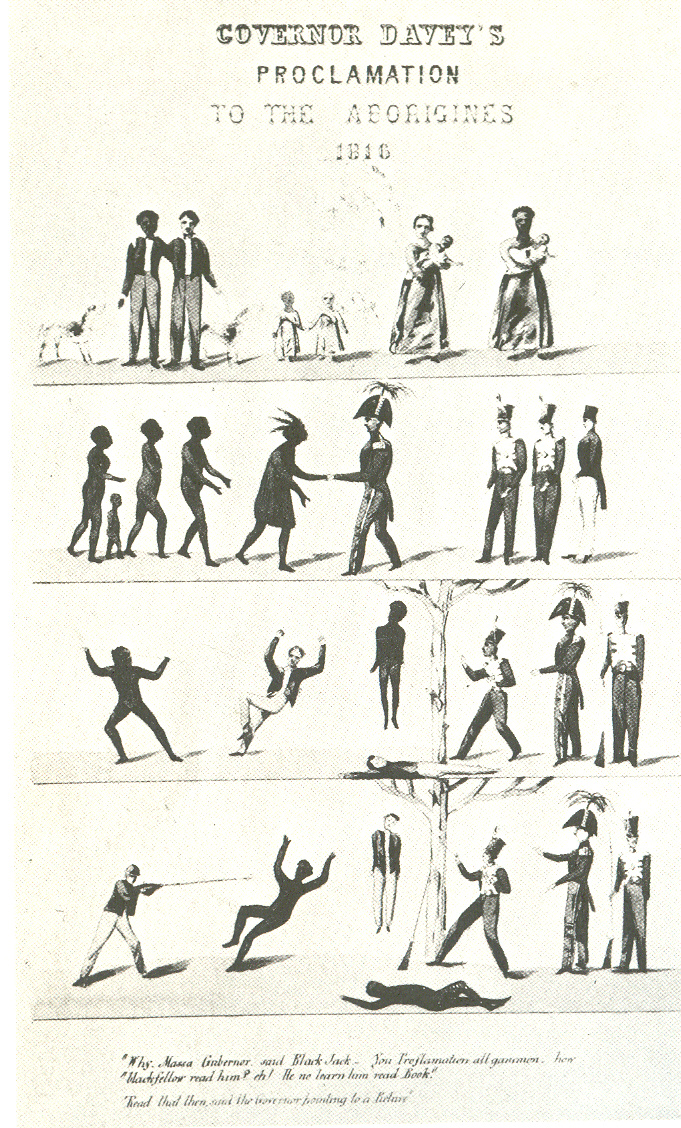
Proclamation issued in 1816 to promote friendship between Aboriginal and white people, though it had little effect

- 1810: David Collins dies suddenly, Lieutenant Edward Lord takes over and first of three administrators pending appointment of second lieutenant-governor.
- 1810: First church, St David's, built
- 1810: Colony's first flour mill built beside Rivulet between Murray St and Elizabeth St, operated by Edward Lord and William Collins
- 1810: Administration launches colony's first newspaper, the Derwent Star and Van Diemen's Land Intelligencer
- 1810: Sealing expedition discovers Macquarie Island
- 1811: After arriving from Sydney, Governor Lachlan Macquarie draws up plan for Hobart streets and orders construction of public buildings and Mount Nelson signal station.
- 1812: Michael Howe (later bushranging gang leader) among first convicts to arrive directly from England in HMS Indefatigable
- 1812: Northern Tasmania's lieutenant-governorship ceases, Government House in Hobart takes control of whole island
- 1813: Schooner Unity not heard of again after convicts seize it in Derwent
- 1813: First Post Office opens in postmaster's house on corner of Argyle St and Macquarie St
- 1814: Work starts on Anglesea Barracks, Australia's longest continuously occupied military building
- 1814: Colony's first horse races believed to have taken place at New Town
- 1814: Lieutenant-governor's court created to deal with small personal financial disputes.
- 1814: Governor Lachlan Macquarie offers amnesty to bushrangers
- 1814: Ship Argo disappears after seizure by convicts in Derwent
- 1815: Michael Howe's bushranging gang kills two settlers in New Norfolk raid
- 1815: Lieutenant-Governor Thomas Davey declares martial law against all bushrangers, mainly escaped convicts, with some military deserters; Governor Lachlan Macquarie later revokes order.
- 1815: Captain James Kelly circumnavigates island in whaleboat
- 1815: First Van Diemen's Land wheat shipment to Sydney.
- 1816: First emigrant ship arrives with free settlers from England
- 1817: Weekly mail service begins between Hobart and Launceston
- 1817: Work starts on new St David's Church, replacing earlier structure blown down in storm
- 1817: First convict ships arrive directly from England
- 1817: New Government House occupied in Macquarie St, on site of present Town Hall, lower Elizabeth St and Franklin Square.
- 1818: Government opens flour mill in Hobart
- 1818: Soldiers and convict kill bushranger Michael Howe on banks of Shannon River
- 1818: Government establishes nucleus of Royal Tasmanian Botanical Gardens
- 1819: First proper hospital opens
- 1819: Hobart-New Norfolk road built
- 1819: St David's Church opens

=== 1820–1829 ===
In 1820, Tasmanian roads were first macadamised and carthorses began to replace bullocks. In the same year, the first substantial jail was completed on the corner of Macquarie Street and Murray Street; and merino sheep arrived from John Macarthur's stud in New South Wales. 1820 also saw the first Wesleyan (Methodist) meeting in the colony. The following year marked the arrival of the first Catholic clergyman, Father Phillip Conolly; and on his second visit, Governor Lachlan Macquarie chose sites for Perth, Campbell Town, Ross, Oatlands, Sorell and Brighton. In 1821, officials and convicts left Port Dalrymple to establish Macquarie Harbour penal settlement at Sarah Island.

1822 was the first year Van Diemen's Land Agricultural Society held a meeting in Hobart. In 1823 the Presbyterian Church's first official ministry in Australia occurred in Hobart and the first Tasmanian bank, Bank of Van Diemen's Land, was established.

The inauguration of the Supreme Court occurred in 1824, as did the opening of Cascade Brewery, Australia's longest continuously operating Brewery. Convict Alexander Pearce was hanged after escaping twice from Macquarie Harbour and surviving by eating his companions. Convict Matthew Brady began his bushranging career after escaping from Macquarie Harbour.

On 3 December 1825, Van Diemen's Land became independent from New South Wales with an appointed Executive Council, its own judicial establishment, and Legislative Council. Also in that year, the Richmond Bridge, Australia's oldest existing bridge, was opened; and a party of soldiers and convicts established Maria Island penal settlement.

In 1826, Van Diemen's Land Company launched the North-West pastoral and agricultural development at Circular Head; and the Tasmanian Turf Club was established. Settler John Batman, later one of Melbourne's founders, helped capture bushranger Matthew Brady near Launceston. Hobart experienced a disease epidemic which was blamed on rivulet pollution. A courthouse was built on the corner of Macquarie Street and Murray Street; and street lighting with oil lamps was introduced. 1826 was also the year that the Legislative Council met formally for the first time.

1827 saw the first regatta-style events on Derwent River; and Van Diemen's Land Company began settlement at Emu Bay (now Burnie).

A proclamation made in 1828 by Lieutenant-Governor George Arthur excluded Aboriginal people from settled areas and was the year of the Cape Grim massacre. In 1828, martial law was also declared against Aboriginal people in settled areas after Van Diemen's Land Company shepherds killed 30 Aboriginal people at Cape Grim. Regular mail services to and from Sydney began. That year also saw widespread floods. The following year a jail for women convicts ("female factory") opened at Cascades; "Protector" George Augustus Robinson started an Aboriginal mission at Bruny Island, convicts seized the brig Cyprus at Recherche Bay and sailed to China; Van Diemen's Land Scientific Society was formed under patronage of Lieutenant-Governor George Arthur; and a Hobart-New Norfolk coach service began.

=== 1830–1839 ===
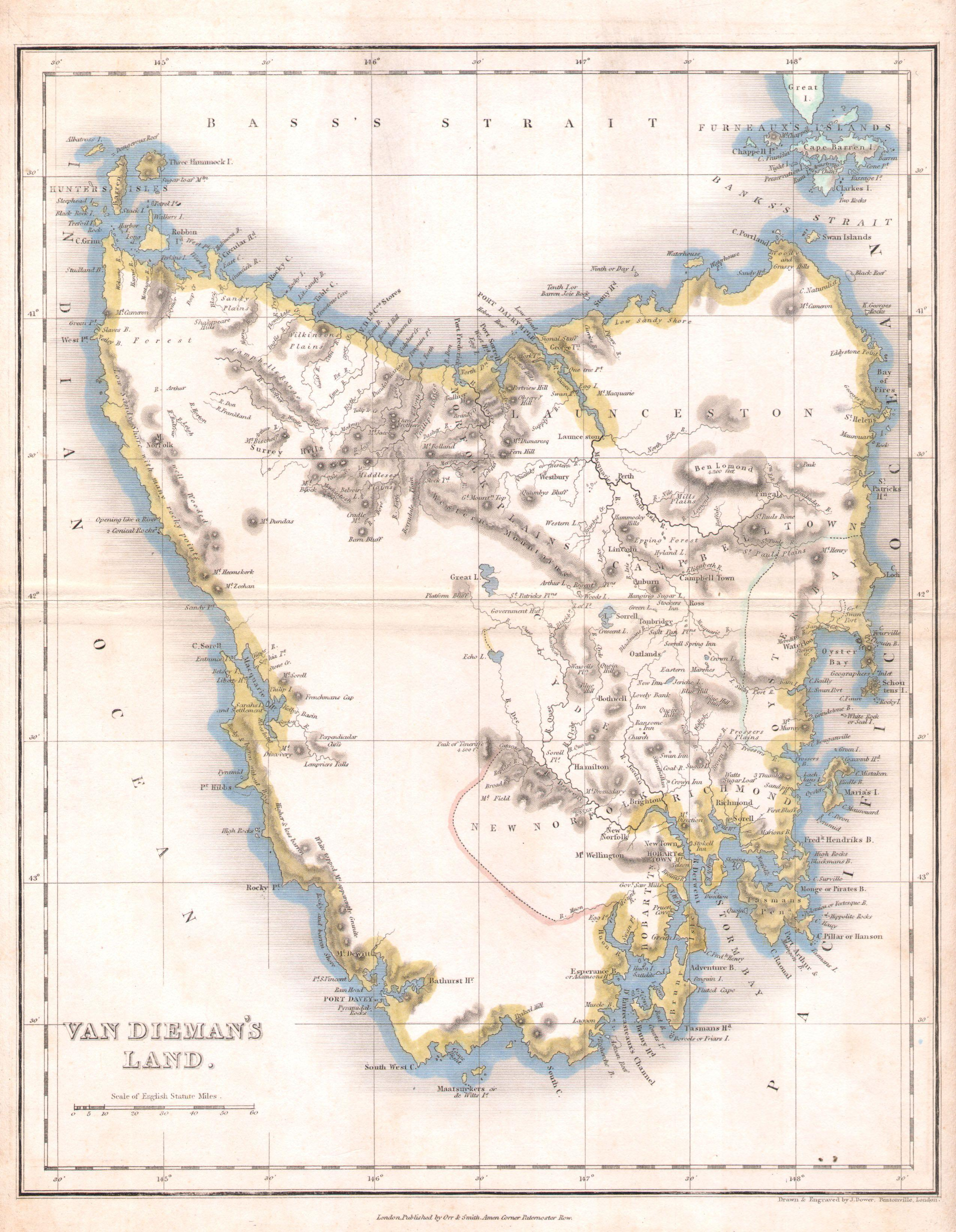
A map of Tasmania from 1837.

- 1830: George Augustus Robinson starts reconciliation efforts with Aboriginal people by visiting west coast
- 1830: Samuel Anderson, Pioneer Settler, arrives in Hobart aboard the Lang, employed as book keeper with Van Diemens Land Co. Will go on to establish the third permanent settlement in Victoria at Westernport.
- 1830: Administration launches "Black Line" military campaign across most of colony to round up Aboriginal people; in seven weeks two are shot and two are captured
- 1830: Port Arthur penal settlement established
- 1830: Convict chain gang starts work on causeway across Derwent at Bridgewater
- John Glover English landscape painter, arrives in Van Diemen's Land on his 64th birthday
- 1831: Australia's first novel, Quintus Servinton, by Henry Savery, published in Hobart
- 1831: New land regulations discontinue free land grants, replacing them with sales
- 1832: George Augustus Robinson arrives in Hobart with Aboriginal people from Oyster Bay and Big River tribes, the last Aboriginal people removed from European-settled areas; Wybalenna, Flinders Island, chosen for Aboriginal resettlement site.
- 1832: Ends of martial law against Aboriginal people
- 1832: Work starts on Cascade Brewery
- 1832: Regular Hobart-Launceston coach service begins
- 1832: Maria Island penal settlement closes
- 1832: Derwent Light ("Iron Pot") lit for first time
- 1833: Robert Massie arrives in Tasmania takes up position as Engineer with Van Diemens Land Co.
- 1833: First professional theatrical performance in Hobart
- 1833: Macquarie Harbour penal settlement closes, convicts transferred to Port Arthur
- 1834: Convicts evacuating Macquarie Harbour capture brig Frederick and sail to Chile
- 1834: Stagecoaches begin daily Hobart-New Norfolk, weekly Hobart-Launceston services
- 1834: Daily Hobart-New Norfolk steamship trips begin
- 1834: Launceston "female factory" completed
- 1834: Point Puer boys' convict establishment opens at Port Arthur
- 1834: First coal shipment leaves convict mines on Tasman Peninsula
- 1834: Jury trial system for all civil cases begins
- 1834: Horse-drawn coaches begin taxi-style service
- 1834: Henty brothers leave Launceston for Portland Bay to make first European settlement in Victoria
- 1835: Nearly all remaining Tasmanian Aboriginal people surrender to George Augustus Robinson and are moved to Flinders Island
- 1835: Transport George III sinks in D'Entrecasteaux Channel with loss of 139 male convicts of 220 aboard
- 1835: In separate expeditions, John Batman and John Pascoe Fawkner leave Launceston to launch first European settlements at Port Phillip, which developed into Melbourne.
- 1835: Samuel Anderson leaves Launceston to establish third permanent Victorian settlement at Bass in Western Port.
- 1835: Colonial artist John Glover sends 35 paintings of Van Diemen's Land to London exhibition.
- 1835: First meeting to establish Launceston Bank for Savings.
- 1836: First Catholic Church was built—St John the Evangelist's Church in Richmond. It is the oldest running Catholic Church in Australia.
- 1836: Charles Darwin visits Hobart during round-the-world voyage in HMS Beagle
- 1836: Hobart Post office moves to premises on corner of Elizabeth Street and Collins Street
- 1836: Eleven counties, and some parishes therein, proclaimed; establishing the cadastral divisions of the colony
- 1837: Theatre Royal opens
- 1837: Lieutenant Governor Sir John Franklin founds Tasmanian Society for the Study of Natural Science
- 1837: Police office built on corner of Macquarie Street and Murray Street
- 1838: The first secular register of births, deaths and marriages in the British colonies established
- 1838: First annual Hobart Regatta on Derwent
- 1838: Work begins on old Customs House, which becomes Parliament House at start of responsible self-government in 1856
- 1838: Sir John Franklin establishes board of education to introduce non-denominational schools
- 1838: Bruny Island Lighthouse completed

=== 1840–1849 ===
- 1840: Economic depression starts, continues until 1845
- 1840: Captain James Ross arrives with Antarctic expedition in HMS Erebus and HMS Terror
- 1840: Sir John Franklin establishes Ross Bank meteorological observatory site, named after explorer, near present Government House site
- 1840: Dr William Bedford founds first Hobart private hospital (in house near Theatre Royal) after dispute at government hospital
- 1840: Transportation from Britain to NSW ends, causing heavier influx of convicts to Tasmania
- 1842: Colony's first official census, population 57,471
- 1842: The Weekly Examiner begins publication in Launceston
- 1842: Hobart proclaimed a city
- 1842: Tasmanian Journal of Natural Science, first Australian scientific journal, begins publication
- 1842: Peak year for convict arrivals (5329)
- 1842: Maria Island's Darlington penitentiary reopened
- 1843: Arrival of Tasmania's first Anglican bishop, Francis Russell Nixon
- 1843: Bushranger Martin Cash captured in Hobart, his death sentence was commuted and he was later pardoned
- 1844: First Catholic bishop, Robert Willson, arrives
- 1844: Formation of Royal Society of Tasmania, first branch outside Britain, as development of society founded in 1837 by Sir John Franklin; society branch takes over botanical gardens
- 1844: Norfolk Island, formerly administered by NSW, comes under Tasmanian control
- 1845: Emigrant ship Cataraqui wrecked near King Island, 406 lives lost
- 1845: Hobart Savings Bank opens
- 1845: Jewish community consecrates Hobart Synagogue, Australia's oldest
- 1845: Artist John Skinner Prout organises first known Australian exhibition of pictures in Hobart
- 1846: Absconding Act introduced to detain escaping convicts.
- 1846: Foundation of the Hutchins School and Launceston Grammar School
- 1846: Lieutenant-governor Sir John Eardley-Wilmot dismissed, allegedly for failure to suppress convict homosexuality
- 1846: Convict transportation to Tasmania suspended until 1848
- 1846: Tasmania becomes first Australian colony to enact legislation to protect native animals
- 1847: Britain orders closure of NSW convict establishment and transfer of remaining prisoners to Tasmania
- 1847: Big Hobart meeting petitions Queen Victoria for end to transportation
- 1847: Wybalenna Aboriginal settlement at Flinders Island closes and surviving 47 Aboriginal people move to Oyster Cove
- 1847: News of Sir John Franklin's death during Arctic exploration reaches Hobart
- 1847: Charles Davis founds hardware business
- 1847: Launceston doctor W. R. Pugh uses ether as general anaesthetic for first time in Tasmania
- 1848: Hobart peaks as whaling port, with 1046 men aboard 37 ships
- 1848: Colony now only place of transportation in British Empire
- 1849: "Young Irelanders" (Irish political prisoners), including William Smith O'Brien, arrive at Port Arthur
- 1849: Anti-transportation league formed after Launceston public meeting
- 1849: Tasmania gets first public library
- 1849: Tasmanian apple growers export to the United States of America and New Zealand

=== 1850–1859 ===
- 1850: Prisoner Patrick O'Donoghue starts publishing 'The Irish Exile', first Irish Nationalist paper in Australia.
- 1850: First secular high school built at Domain
- 1850: Constitution Dock officially opened
- 1851: O'Donoghue sent to a chain-gang, released, restarts his paper and sent again to a chain-gang.
- 1851: Black Thursday bushfires in February
- 1851: Influenza epidemic
- 1851: First election for 16 non-appointed members of Legislative Council
- 1851: Hobart Chamber of Commerce established
- 1851: Launceston host for first intercolonial cricket match (Van Diemen's Land v Port Phillip district)
- 1851: Maria Island's Darlington penitentiary abandoned
- 1852: Elections for first Hobart and Launceston municipal councils
- 1852: Payable gold discovered near Fingal
- 1853: Jubilee festival in Hobart celebrates end of convict transportation after arrival of last ship, the St Vincent
- 1853: First Tasmanian adhesive postage stamp issued
- 1854: Severe floods, fires hit city
- 1854: The Mercury founded as bi-weekly publication
- 1855: Horse-drawn "buses" (large carts) begin services, mainly on city–New Town route; they later become enclosed vehicles
- 1855: Henry Young becomes first vice-regal representative to have title of Governor
- 1856: Name of Van Diemen's Land officially changed to Tasmania after grant of responsible self-government
- 1856: New two-house Parliament opens after elections, William Champ becomes colony's first Premier
- 1856: Norfolk Island transferred from Tasmanian to NSW control
- 1857: Hobart's municipal Incorporation
- 1857: Hobart-Launceston telegraph line opens
- 1857: Hobart customers start using coal gas, streets get gas lighting
- 1858: First meeting of Hobart's Marine Board, Australia's oldest port authority
- 1858: Hobart and Launceston councils form municipal police forces
- 1858: Council of Education established
- 1858: Hobart Savings Bank founded
- 1858: Parliament passes Rural Municipalities Act
- 1859: Worries about public health prompt Hobart Town Council to appoint health officer
- 1859: New Government House at Domain occupied for first time, by Governor Henry Young and Lady Young

=== 1860–1869 ===
- 1860: British troops sail from Hobart for Māori war in New Zealand
- 1860: Volunteer corps of infantry, cavalry and artillery formed
- 1860: Economic depression
- 1860: The Mercury begins daily publication
- 1862: Tasmania adopts Torrens title land-conveyancing and registration system
- 1862: Serious Derwent flooding
- 1862: Hobart's post office moves to the rebuilt courthouse on corner of Macquarie St and Murray St
- 1863: Opening of Tasmanian Museum on present site
- 1864: First shipment of trout and salmon ova arrives from England
- 1866: Hobart Town Hall opened
- 1866: Hobart Philharmonic Society formed
- 1867: George Peacock launches one of Australia's first jam factories in Hobart (later operated by Henry Jones and Co under the name IXL)
- 1868: First royal visit, during which Prince Alfred (Duke of Edinburgh) lays foundation stone for St David's Cathedral and turns first sod for Tasmania's first railway, Launceston-Deloraine line, built by a private company.
- 1868: With Education Act, Tasmania becomes first Australian colony to have compulsory state education system, administered by local school boards
- 1869: Death of William Lanne ("King Billy"), reputedly the last full blood Tasmanian Aboriginal man; whose remains were disrespected horribly after disagreement over who should have his remains.
- 1869: Submarine communications cable successfully establishes link between Tasmania and Melbourne.

=== 1870–1879 ===
- 1870: British troops leave
- 1870: Tasmanian Public Library formally constituted
- 1871: Opening of Launceston–Deloraine railway, Tasmania's first—(1,600 mm (5 ft 3 in))
- 1871: James "Philosopher" Smith discovers tin at Mount Bischoff
- 1872: Direct telegraphic communication begins between Tasmania and England
- 1873: Work begins on private operated Hobart–Launceston rail link—(1,067 mm (3 ft 6 in))
- 1873: Government takes over Launceston-Deloraine line
- 1874: St David's Cathedral consecrated
- 1874: Tasmanian Racing Club established
- 1874: Launceston rioters protest against rates levy for Deloraine railway
- 1874: First book publication of Marcus Clarke's For the Term of His Natural Life, set mainly in Tasmania
- 1875: Hobart Hospital begins professional training of nurses
- 1875: Widespread flooding
- 1876: Truganini, described as last Tasmanian full blooded Aboriginal person, dies in Hobart
- 1876: Hobart-Launceston railway opens
- 1877: Port Arthur penal settlement closed
- 1877: Gold discovered at Beaconsfield
- 1878: Mount Heemskirk tin mining begins

=== 1880–1889 ===
- 1880: Earthquake hits Hobart
- 1880: Tasmania gets first telephone with line from city centre to Mount Nelson signal station
- 1880: Start of Derwent Sailing Boat Club (later Royal Yacht Club of Tasmania)
- 1880: Gold discovered at Pieman River on West Coast, Tasmania
- 1881: William Shoobridge organises first trial shipment of apples from Hobart to Britain
- 1881: Hobart officially replaces 'Hobart Town' as capital's name
- 1882: Married Women's Property Act allows wives to own property in their own right
- 1882: Silver-lead discovered at Zeehan
- 1882: Hobart Stock Exchange opens
- 1883: Typhoid and diphtheria epidemic prompt public health legislation
- 1883: Government opens first Hobart and Launceston telephone exchanges
- 1883: Trades and Labor Council formed
- 1883: Discovery of gold at "Iron Blow" at Mount Lyell amidst increased West Coast, Tasmania mineral prospecting
- 1885: Education Department created, centralising control of schools
- 1885: Mersey and Deloraine Railway opened—4′6″ gauge
- 1885: Oatlands to Parattah Railway opened
- 1885: Formation of the Mt Lyell Prospecting Association
- 1886: Copper found at Mount Lyell
- 1886: Government takes over Tasmanian Museum and Royal Tasmanian Botanical Gardens
- 1886: Federal Council of Australasia discusses Federation at its first assembly held in Hobart
- 1886: Public Health Act creates local boards of health
- 1887: Derwent Valley railway line to New Norfolk opens, extended to Glenora within a year
- 1887: Establishment of The Friends School in Hobart by the Society of Friends (Quakers).
- 1887: Italian entrepreneur Diego Bernacchi floats company to develop Maria Island
- 1888: Hobart gets first technical school
- 1888: Reservoir water supply opened
- 1888: Launceston proclaimed a city
- 1889: Launceston Post Office built

=== 1890–1899 ===
- 1890: University of Tasmania opens at the Domain
- 1890: Government takes over Hobart-Launceston railway
- 1890: Legislation provides for payment of Tasmanian parliamentarians
- 1891: Bank of Van Diemen's Land collapses, economic depression follows
- 1891: Queen Victoria Museum and Art Gallery opens in Launceston
- 1891: Apsley Railway opened
- 1892: George FitzGerald founds FitzGeralds department store chain, now owned by Harris Scarfe
- 1893: Private company begins electric tramway in Hobart, first in an Australian capital city
- 1893: Mount Lyell Mining and Railway Company formed
- 1893: Government establishes Tasmanian Tourist Association
- 1894: Hobart international exhibition opens
- 1894: Government introduces flat-rate income tax system
- 1895: The premiers conference in Hobart discusses proposals for federal constitution and plebiscite.
- 1895: Launceston becomes first southern hemisphere city to get electric light after first Tasmanian hydro-electric station opens at Duck Reach on South Esk River
- 1895: All Tasmanian districts move to Australian Eastern Standard Time, ending different time zones in colony
- 1896: Entrepreneur George Adams launches Tattersalls lottery venture in Hobart; first lottery held to dispose of assets of failed Bank of Van Diemen's Land
- 1896: Ore smelting begins at Mount Lyell
- 1897: Hare-Clark voting system used on trial basis for state polls in Hobart and Launceston (six members in Hobart, four in Launceston)
- 1897: Formation of Southern Tasmania Football Association
- 1897: Serious bushfires start on New Year's Eve, end with six lives lost
- 1898: Tasmanians vote four to one in favor of referendum on federation with mainland colonies
- 1898: Municipal police forces become part of new statewide government force
- 1898: Electric street lighting begins in Hobart
- 1898: Norwegian-born Carsten Borchgrevink's Antarctic expedition arrives in Hobart on way south; Tasmanian Louis Bernacchi joins as physicist
- 1899: First Tasmanian troops leave for Second Boer War in South Africa
- 1899: Federation of Australia wins overwhelming Tasmanian approval in the second referendum

=== 1900–1909 ===
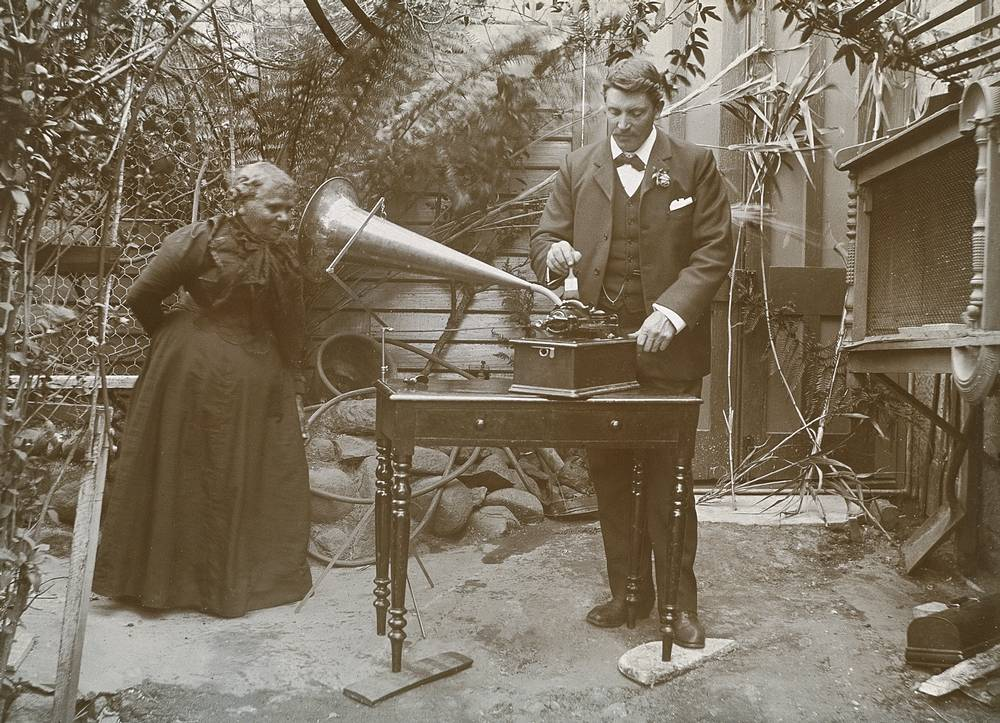
Horace Watson recording the songs of Fanny Cochrane Smith, considered to be the last fluent speaker of a Tasmanian language, 1903.

- 1900: More Tasmanian troops leave for Second Boer War
- 1900: Adult male suffrage for House of Assembly adopted, with property qualifications abolished
- 1900: End of whaling operations from Hobart
- 1900: Bubonic plague scare grips Tasmania
- 1900: Macquarie Island becomes a Tasmanian dependency
- 1901: Administrator Sir John Dodds reads proclamation of Commonwealth of Australia from Tasmanian Supreme Court steps
- 1901: Visit by Duke and Duchess of Cornwall and York (future King George V and Queen Mary)
- 1901: First elections for Federal Parliament
- 1901: Zeehan conference leads to formation of Tasmanian Workers' Political League (forerunner to Labor Party)
- 1902: Last Tasmanian troops return from the Boer War
- 1902: Robert Carl Sticht completes world's first successful pyritic smelting at Mount Lyell
- 1903: Women get House of Assembly voting right (the already had it for federal polls)
- 1903: Hobart-Launceston telephone line opens
- 1903: Two ships leave Hobart on relief expedition to free British explorer Robert Scott's Discovery from Antarctic ice
- 1903: Launceston smallpox epidemic forces cancellation of Tasmanian centenary celebrations, some festivities a year later
- 1904: Legislation allows Tasmanian women to become lawyers
- 1904: Formation of Tasmanian National Association (forerunner to Liberal Party)
- 1904: Native flora and fauna reserve declared at Schouten Island and Freycinet Peninsula
- 1905: Wireless telegraphy experiments between Hobart and Tasman Island and between state and mainland
- 1905: Hobart General Post Office building opens
- 1906: Marconi Co. demonstrated a wireless telegraphy service between Devonport and Queenscliff, Victoria
- 1906: Tasman Lighthouse first lit
- 1907: New public library, built with money from American philanthropist Andrew Carnegie, opens in Hobart
- 1907: Hare-Clark voting system extended to all of Tasmania
- 1908: State school fees abolished
- 1908: Queen Alexandra Maternity Hospital opens in Hobart
- 1908: First Scout troops formed
- 1909: Guy Fawkes Day (5 November) fire destroy Hobart market, City Hall later built on site
- 1909: First statewide use of Hare-Clark voting system elects first Labor government, led by John Earle; government lasts only one week, with return of conservatives
- 1909: Irish blight wipes out potato crop

=== 1910–1919 ===
- 1910: Carters' wage strike paralyses Hobart for a week, ends with win for workers
- 1910: Legislation sets maximum 48-hour working week and minimum wages in several trades
- 1910: Great Lake hydro-electric project starts
- 1911: The Christian Brothers founded and opened the St. Virgil's College School in what is now, Barrack Street in Hobart.
- 1911: Douglas Mawson's ship Aurora docks in Hobart on way to Antarctic
- 1911: Philip Smith teachers' college opens at Domain, Electric trams begin running in Launceston
- 1912: Mount Lyell fire traps miners underground, 42 die
- 1912: Norwegian Roald Amundsen, first man to reach South Pole, arrives in Hobart on return from Antarctic expedition
- 1912: Hobart City Council takes over tramway service
- 1912: First Tasmanian Girl Guide company formed
- 1913: First government high schools open in Hobart and Launceston
- 1913: Hobart City Council buys tram service
- 1913: Term "free by servitude" referring to ex-convicts, appears for last time in official documents, after use for more than 100 years
- 1914: A. Delfosse Badgery makes Tasmania's first flight from Elwick in a plane he built himself
- 1914: First Tasmanian troops leave to fight in World War I
- 1914: The town of Bismarck is renamed Collinsvale due to anti-German sentiment inflamed by the war
- 1914: State government buys hydro-electric company
- 1915: Tasmanian legislation establishes Australia's first special authority to create and manage parks and reserves
- 1915: Serious bushfires
- 1916: In Tasmania's worst rail disaster, driver and six passengers die, 31 survive injuries, after Launceston-Hobart express crashes near Campania
- 1916: First all-Tasmanian battalion (the 40th) leaves for World War I
- 1916: Opening of Great Lakes hydro scheme's first stage, Waddamana power station
- 1916: State's first national parks declared at Mount Field and Freycinet
- 1916: Daylight saving time first introduced as temporary wartime measure
- 1917: Electrolytic Zinc Company works at Risdon and Australian Commonwealth Carbide's plant at Electrona established
- 1917: Ridgeway reservoir completed
- 1919: Worldwide Spanish influenza epidemic reaches Tasmania, affecting one-third of the population and claiming 171 lives
- 1919: Ex-World War I airman A. L. Long makes first flight over Bass Strait
- 1919: Frozen Tasmanian meat exported for the first time

=== 1920–1929 ===
- 1920: Visit by Prince of Wales, future King Edward VIII
- 1920: Miena dam completed
- 1920: Launceston-born Hudson Fysh helps found Qantas
- 1922: Legislation enables women to stand in state elections
- 1922: Legacy movement starts with founding of Remembrance Club in Hobart by Major-General Sir John Gellibrand
- 1922: Cradle Mountain-Lake St Clair National Park proclaimed
- 1923: First concert by Hobart Symphony Orchestra
- 1923: Severe flooding in Hobart
- 1923: Labor's Joseph Lyons, a future prime minister, becomes state premier
- 1924: Private company starts first Tasmanian radio station, 7ZL (now part of ABC), with regular broadcasts from The Mercury building
- 1924: Electrolytic Zinc Co makes first superphosphate at Risdon
- 1925: Workmen open David Collins' grave during conversion of old St David's Cemetery into St David's Park
- 1925: Osmiridium fields discovered at Adamsfield in south-west
- 1927: Inquiry into proposed bridge linking Hobart city with eastern shore
- 1927: Visit by Duke and Duchess of York (future King George VI and Queen Elizabeth)
- 1928: Cadbury's Claremont factory makes first chocolate
- 1928: Voting in Tasmanian state elections becomes compulsory (federal voting became compulsory in 1924)
- 1929: Disastrous floods, mainly in Northern Tasmania, take 22 lives; dam burst damages Derby township and tin mines
- 1929: Hobart gets automatic telephone system
- 1929: Great Depression begins
- 1929: Legislation creates Hydro-Electric Commission, replacing government department

=== 1930–1939 ===
- 1931: Tasmanian Harold Gatty and American Wiley Post make record round-the-world flight (eight days, 15 hours)
- 1932: Ivan and Victor Holyman start air service between Launceston and Flinders Island
- 1932: Lyell Highway opens, linking Hobart with West Coast
- 1932: Former premier Joseph Lyons becomes prime minister, only Tasmanian to hold that office
- 1933: Commonwealth Grants Commission appointed to inquire into affairs of claimant states, including Tasmania
- 1934: Holyman's Airways (a forerunner of Ansett) launches Launceston–Melbourne service, within months, company plane Miss Hobart disappears over Bass Strait with loss of 12 people, including proprietor Victor Holyman
- 1934: Election of government led by Albert Ogilvie starts 35 years of continuous Labor governments
- 1935: Five die when Holyman Airways plane Loina crashes off Flinders Island.
- 1935: Hobart gets first electric trolley buses
- 1935: Legislation for three-year state parliament terms
- 1936: SS Paringa sinks in Bass Strait while towing tanker, 31 die
- 1936: ABC forms orchestra
- 1936 (7 September): Last known Tasmanian tiger (thylacine) dies at Hobart's Beaumaris Zoo
- 1936: First commercial flights use federal aerodrome at Cambridge
- 1936: Submarine telephone cable service begins between Tasmania and Victoria via King Island
- 1936: First two area schools (renamed district schools in 1973) open at Sheffield and Hagley
- 1937: Open of Mount Wellington summit road, built as Depression relief work project
- 1937: Poliomyelitis epidemic
- 1937: Five-year state parliamentary terms return
- 1938: Production starts at APPM's Burnie mill
- 1938: Work begins on a floating arch bridge across Derwent in Hobart
- 1939: World War II begins
- 1939: Death in office of prime minister Joseph Lyons
- 1939: Royal Hobart Hospital opens on present site

=== 1940–1949 ===
- 1940: Tasmanian soldiers leave for North African campaign with Australian 6th Division
- 1940: German naval raiders Pinguin and Atlantis lay mines off Hobart and other Australian areas. Hobart closed to shipping because of mine threat; Bass Strait closed after mine sinks British steamer Cambridge.
- 1941: Tasmanian soldiers leave for Malaya with Australian 8th Division
- 1941: Australian Newsprint Mills' Boyer plant becomes first in world to produce newsprint from hardwood
- 1942 (January–March): daylight saving time introduced as wartime measure
- 1942: Women 18 to 30 called up for war work
- 1943: Floating-arch pontoon bridge Hobart Bridge opens
- 1943: Enid Lyons (later Dame Enid), widow of Joseph Lyons, elected first woman member of House of Representatives, winning seat of Darwin (now Braddon).
- 1944: University of Tasmania begins transfer to Sandy Bay site
- 1944: State Library established
- 1945: Rani wins first Sydney to Hobart Yacht Race
- 1946: Australian National Airways plane crashes at Seven Mile Beach, killing 25
- 1946: Last horse-drawn Hobart cab ceases operation
- 1946: Poliomyelitis epidemic
- 1947: War-affected migrants begin arriving from Europe to work for Hydro-Electric Commission
- 1947: Edward Brooker takes over as Labor premier after Robert Cosgrove's resignation to face corruption and bribery charges
- 1947: Major flooding in south of state
- 1948: Margaret McIntyre wins Legislative Council seat in May, becoming the first woman member of Tasmanian Parliament; airliner crash in NSW in September kills her and 12 others.
- 1948: Robert Cosgrove resumes premiership after acquittal on corruption and bribery charges
- 1948: ABC forms Tasmanian Symphony Orchestra on permanent basis
- 1948: Fire destroys Ocean Pier
- 1948: Antarctic research station established on Macquarie Island
- 1949: Poliomyelitis epidemic
- 1949: Government introduces compulsory X-rays in fight against tuberculosis
- 1949: Tasmanian politician Dame Enid Lyons, widow of former prime minister Joseph Lyons, becomes first woman to reach federal ministry rank, as Executive Council vice-president
- 1949: Government buys Theatre Royal

=== 1950–1959 ===
- 1951: Brighton army camp gets first intake of national service trainees
- 1951: Hartz Mountains National Park proclaimed
- 1951: Tasmanian Historical Research Association commences
- 1951: Serious bushfires
- 1951: Italian and German migrants arrive to work under contract for the Hydro-Electric Commission
- 1952: First woman elected to Hobart City Council
- 1952: Severe floods
- 1952: Government ends free hospital scheme
- 1952: Single state licensing body formed for hotels and clubs
- 1953: Tasman Limited diesel train service begins between Hobart and northern towns
- 1953: Housing Department created to manage public housing
- 1953: Beaconsfield becomes first Australian centre to get fluoridated water
- 1954: Queen Elizabeth II becomes first reigning monarch to visit state, accompanied by Prince Philip. As part of 150th anniversary celebrations, she unveils monument to pioneer British settlers
- 1954: Hobart Rivulet area damaged as severe floods affect southern and eastern Tasmania
- 1954: Metropolitan Transport Trust formed
- 1954: Tattersalls Lotteries moves headquarters from Hobart to Melbourne
- 1954: Spouses of property owners get right to vote in Legislative Council elections
- 1955: Royal commission appointed to inquire into University of Tasmania after request by Professor Sydney Orr
- 1955: House of Assembly gets first two women members, Liberals Mabel Miller and Amelia Best
- 1955: Hobart becomes first Australian city to get parking meters
- 1955: Proclamation of Lake Pedder National Park (later extended to form Southwest National Park).
- 1955: First ingot poured at Bell Bay aluminium refinery
- 1955: Labor Party's federal conference in Hobart brings Australian Labor Party split over industrial groups to head, leading to formation of Australian Labor Party (Anti-Communist), later Democratic Labor Party
- 1955: Lactos cheese factory opens at Burnie
- 1956: University of Tasmania Council dismisses Professor Sydney Orr, alleging improper conduct by him with female student; Orr launches unsuccessful court action against university for wrongful dismissal
- 1956: Tasmania gets first woman mayor, Dorothy Edwards of Launceston
- 1957: Water Act establishes Rivers and Water Supply Commission
- 1958: Hobart waterside works block two Australian Labor Party (Anti-Communist) members, father Frank Hursey and son Denis, from working in dispute over their objection to paying union levy that would partly go to ALP; police guard Hurseys after court order; Supreme Court awards them damages
- 1959: MG Car Club of Tasmania formed
- 1959: Princess of Tasmania becomes first roll-on/roll-off passenger ferry on Bass Strait run
- 1959: High Court verdict in Hursey case upholds unions' right to levy members for political purposes, expel those who refuse to pay
- 1959: Federal Government reduces claimant states to two, Tasmania and Western Australia

=== 1960–1969 ===
- 1960: Severe floods in Derwent Valley and Hobart, with business basements under water and houses washed away
- 1960: Television stations ABT-2 (ABC) and TVT-6 (now WIN) start programs from Mount Wellington transmitters
- 1960: New jail opens at Risdon
- 1960: Hobart trams cease, succeeded by electric trolley buses
- 1960: First meeting of Inland Fisheries Commission
- 1960: Opening of new State Library headquarters
- 1960: First city parking station opens in Argyle Street
- 1961: Construction of Hobart-Sydney ferry terminal begins
- 1962: Australian Paper Makers Ltd's Port Huon mill opens
- 1962: TEMCO's Bell Bay ferro-manganese plant begins production
- 1962: Government subsidises municipal fluoridation schemes
- 1963: University of Tasmania completes move to Sandy Bay site; Universities Commission recommends medical school
- 1964: Tasman Bridge opens for traffic, old pontoon bridge towed away
- 1964: Hobart's water supply fluoridated
- 1964: Glenorchy proclaimed city
- 1965: First Tasmanians leave for Vietnam War under national service scheme
- 1965: Ferry Empress of Australia makes first Sydney–Hobart voyage
- 1965: Official opening of Tasmanian Conservatorium of Music
- 1965: Bass Strait oil drilling begins
- 1966: Huge copper reserves found in Mount Lyell area
- 1966: Savage River iron ore agreements involving $62 million signed
- 1967 (February): Black Tuesday bushfires claim 62 lives—53 in Hobart area—and destroy more than 1300 homes
- 1967: Tasmanian joins other states in approving full constitutional rights for Aboriginal people
- 1967: Hydro-Electric Commission tables plans in State Parliament to dam Lake Pedder in South-West
- 1967: Daylight saving time and breathalyser tests introduced
- 1968: Full adult franchise introduced for Legislative Council elections
- 1968: Hobart trolley buses cease, replaced by diesel vehicles
- 1968: State abolishes death penalty
- 1968: Savage River iron ore project officially opens
- 1968: Batman Bridge across lower Tamar River opens
- 1969: Tasmanians vote Labor Party out after 35 years in office, Liberal-Centre Party forms coalition government
- 1969: Worst floods in 40 years hit Launceston

=== 1970–1979 ===
A video by the ABC about the introduction of daylight saving time.

- 1970: Parliament legislates for permanent daylight saving time
- 1970: State marine research laboratories at Taroona open
- 1970: Electrolytic Zinc Company opens $6 million residue treatment plant
- 1971: First woodchip shipment leaves Tasmanian Pulp and Forest Holdings' mill at Triabunna
- 1971: APPM Ltd's Wesley Vale paper plant opens
- 1971: First state Aboriginal conference held in Launceston
- 1972: Conservationists lose battle to prevent flooding of Lake Pedder in South-West for hydro-electric scheme
- 1972: Liberal-Centre Party coalition government collapses
- 1972: Tasmanian College of Advanced Education opens in Hobart
- 1972: Ferry Princess of Tasmania makes last Tasmanian voyage
- 1972: Tasmanian Aboriginal Centre opens at Tasmanian Aboriginal Information Centre
- 1973: Coastal freighter Blythe Star sinks with loss of three men, seven survivors spend eight days adrift in lifeboat before coming ashore on Forestier Peninsula
- 1973: Australia's first legal casino opens at Wrest Point Hotel Casino
- 1973: Sir Stanley Burbury, formerly chief justice, becomes first Australian-born governor of Tasmania
- 1974: Three die when boiler explosion demolishes laundry at Mt St Canice Convent, Sandy Bay
- 1974: Tasmanian workers under state wages board awards get four weeks annual leave; woman awarded equal pay
- 1974: Hobart suburban rail services cease
- 1975: Freighter MV Lake Illawarra crashes into Tasman Bridge, causing 12 deaths and bringing down part of bridge; temporary Bailey bridge put across Derwent
- 1975: Police academy completed at Rokeby
- 1975: Hotels allowed to open for Sunday trading
- 1975: Totalizator Agency Board begins operating
- 1976: Members of Aboriginal community ritually cremate Truganini's remains, scatter ashes in D'Entrecasteaux Channel
- 1976: Tasmanian Wilderness Society formed
- 1976: Freight equalisation scheme subsidises sea cargo to and from state
- 1977: Repaired Tasman Bridge reopens to traffic
- 1977: Royal visit, during which Aboriginal activist Michael Mansell presents the Queen with land rights claim
- 1977: Tasmanian Film Corporation launched
- 1978: Australian National Railways takes over Tasmanian rail system; Tasman Limited ceases operations, ending regular passenger train services in state
- 1978: Hydro-Electric Commission proposes power scheme involving Gordon, Franklin and King rivers
- 1979: Tasmanian College of Advanced Education moves to Launceston
- 1979: State's first ombudsman begins duties
- 1979: Hobart gets increased Saturday morning shopping
- 1979: Government expands South-West conservation area to more than one-fifth of state's total area

=== 1980–1989 ===
- 1980: Australian Antarctic Division headquarters completed at Kingston
- 1980: Labor MHA Gillian James becomes first woman to become State Government minister
- 1980: Australian Maritime College opens at Beauty Point
- 1980: Australian Heritage Commission includes Tasmania on National Estate register
- 1981: Plebiscite on preferred new hydro-electric power development scheme shows 47% of voters favour Gordon-below-Franklin development, 8% prefer Gordon-above-Olga, with 45% casting informal votes, including 'no dams' write-ins.
- 1981: Devonport proclaimed city
- 1981: Bushfires destroy 40 Zeehan homes
- 1982: Proclamation of Tasmanian Wilderness World Heritage Area, including South-West, Franklin-Lower Gordon Wild Rivers and Cradle Mountain-Lake St Clair national parks; conservationists blockade Gordon-below-Franklin hydro-electric dam work
- 1982: Tasmanians elect Liberals as government in their own right for first time in state's history
- 1983: Federal regulations block Franklin Dam construction; High Court rules in favour of federal sovereignty, ending the proposed Gordon-below-Franklin scheme
- 1983: Tasmanian Aboriginal Land Council established
- 1983: Visit by The Prince and Princess of Wales
- 1984: Official opening of Bowen Bridge
- 1984: Official opening of Wrest Point Convention Centre
- 1984: Fire damages Theatre Royal
- 1984: Atlantic salmon eggs introduced to Tasmania
- 1985: Four-day cremation ceremony at Oyster Cove, south of Hobart, for Aboriginal remains recovered from museums
- 1985: CSIRO Marine Laboratories open in Hobart
- 1985: Last voyage by ferry Empress of Australia before replacement by Abel Tasman
- 1985: Last Tasmanian drive-in theatres close in Hobart and Launceston
- 1985: Municipal rationalisation advances with Launceston taking over St Leonards and Lilydale
- 1986: Pope John Paul II holds mass for 32,000 people at Elwick racecourse during Hobart visit
- 1986: Archaeologists discover Aboriginal rock paintings in South-West believed to be 20,000 years old
- 1987: Launching of Lady Nelson replica ship
- 1987: High Court decision bans logging in Lemonthyme, southern forests
- 1987: Antarctic supply ship Nella Dan sinks off Macquarie Island
- 1988: International fleet of about 200 sailing, cruise and naval ships from about 20 countries calls at Hobart as part of Australian Bicentennial celebrations; more than 150 leave on race to Sydney
- 1988: Clarence and Burnie proclaimed cities
- 1988: Tasmanian Sporting Hall of Fame opens
- 1989: State election ends with Labor-Green accord involving five independents; their no-confidence vote in Robin Gray's minority Liberal government gives Labor's Michael Field premiership

=== 1990–1999 ===
- 1990: Sea Cat Tasmania, built in Hobart by Incat, begins summer crossings of Bass Strait
- 1990: King Island scheelite mine closes
- 1990: World Rowing Championships held on Lake Barrington, near Sheffield
- 1991: Savings Bank of Tasmania and Tasmanian Bank amalgamate as Trust Bank
- 1991: Port Huon paper mill, Electrona silicon smelter, Renison tin mine and Devonport Ovaltine factory close
- 1992: Aboriginal people occupy Risdon Cove in protest over land claims
- 1992: Royal Hobart Hospital nursing school closes, ending hospital-based nursing training in Tasmania
- 1992: Seven women ordained as Anglican priests at St David's Cathedral
- 1992: State's unemployment rate reaches 12.2% as jobs decline in public and private sectors; rallies of angry workers force temporary closure of House of Assembly
- 1993: Christine Milne (Tasmanian Greens) becomes first female leader of a Tasmanian political party
- 1993: Spirit of Tasmania replaces Abel Tasman on Bass Strait ferry service
- 1993: Tasmania's unemployment rate reaches 13.4%
- 1993: State Government reduces total of municipalities from 46 to 29, number of departments from 17 to 12
- 1994: End to 80 years of dam building as state's last power station, Tribute, opens near Tullah
- 1994: HMAS Huon naval base decommissioned
- 1995: All-day Saturday shop trading begins
- 1995: Government announces legislation to transfer 38 km^{2} of culturally significant land to Aboriginal community, including Risdon Cove and Oyster Cove
- 1995: States unemployment rate falls to 9.6% as number of Tasmanians in work sets record
- 1996 (28 April): Gunman Martin Bryant kills 35 people and injures 20 more in shooting rampage at Port Arthur historic site; Supreme Court sentences him to life imprisonment
- 1996: Former federal Liberal minister Peter Nixon heads Commonwealth state inquiry into Tasmanian economy
- 1997: Tasmania becomes first state to formally apologise to Aboriginal community for past actions connected with the 'stolen generation'.
- 1997: Hobart Ports Corporation succeeds marine board
- 1997: State Parliament repeals two century-old laws that together made all male homosexual activity criminal
- 1997: Royal Hobart Hospital announces part privatisation
- 1997: Official opening of Hobart's Aquatic Centre
- 1997: Nixon report recommendations include single chamber State Parliament with 27 members, government asset sales
- 1997: About 800 gaming machines introduced into 55 Tasmanian hotels, clubs amid predictions of major social problems
- 1998: Federal Government sells Hobart and Launceston airports
- 1998: Subsidiary Kendell Airlines takes over Ansett's Tasmanian services
- 1998: Parliament reduced from 54 members to 40–25 Members of the House of Assembly and 15 Members of the Legislative Council
- 1998: Legislation passed to separate Hydro-Electric Commission into three bodies: Aurora Energy, Transend Networks and Hydro Tasmania.
- 1998: Bushfires destroy six houses in Hobart suburbs, burn out 30 km^{2}
- 1998 (December): Storms and massive seas claim six lives in Sydney to Hobart Yacht Race
- 1999: Wild winds and heavy rain caused chaos across Tasmania, one casualty being the Ferris Wheel at the Royal Hobart Regatta which blew over onto the Gee Whizzer ride. 113 km/h winds in Hobart, 158 km/h winds on Mount Wellington.
- 1999: Tasmanian cricketer David Boon announced his retirement from Sheffield Shield cricket
- March 1999: Tasmania is almost booked out for the millennium New Year's Eve party—a once-in-1000-year event for Tasmania's key resorts, hotels, motels and restaurants
- 1999: Albanian refugees from Kosovo housed at Brighton military camp, renamed Tasmanian Peace Haven
- 1999: Legislation passed to give Aboriginal community control of Wybalenna, Flinders Island
- 1999: Colonial State Bank of NSW takes over Trust Bank
- 1999: Official opening of Port Arthur Visitor Centre
- 1999: Queen Alexandra Hospital building leased to private operators
- 1999 (25 October): Labor part stalwart Eric Reece, hailed as Tasmania's greatest premier, died in Hobart, aged 90
- 1999: Proclamation of Tasmanian Seamounts Marine Reserve, Australia's first deep-sea reserve
- 1999: Tasmania voted the best temperate island in the world by the world's largest travel magazine, Conde Nast Traveler

=== 2000–present ===
- 2000 (1 January): Tasmania beamed to 43 television networks around the world to herald the new millennium
- 2000: Elizabeth II, Queen of Australia visits Hobart
- 2000: Tasmania hosts its first Sorry Day at Risdon Cove
- 2000: Olympic Torch comes to Tasmania
- 2000: New Federation Concert Hall opens in Hobart
- 2001 (10 May): Centenary of Federation celebrated
- 2001: For the first time in 120 years, Tasmanian Australian rules football clubs take the national stage playing home and away VFL games
- 2001: Tasmanian company Gunns clinches $335 million deal to become one of the giants of the Australian forestry industry
- 2001: Impulse Airlines begins, cutting one way Hobart-Melbourne fares to $40, but is subsumed by Qantas
- 2001: 10 Days on the Island begins. It is Tasmania's biggest cultural festival in a century
- 2001: State Government announces $53 million jail to replace the old Risdon Jail
- 2001: New traffic laws introduced, drivers face automatic disqualification if travelling 38 km/h over the limit
- 2001: Meningoccocal hits Tasmania with the first of many deaths
- 2002: House and land boom begins with East Coast blocks selling for almost three times the town's previous record
- 2002 (May): : Tasmania's suburban street speed limit dropped to 50 km/h in a bid to increase road safety
- 2002: Tasmania hit by drought
- 2002 (16 May): Death of Australia's last ANZAC, Tasmania's Alec Campbell, aged 103.
- 2002 (3 August): Tasmanian boxer Daniel Geale wins Tasmania's only gold medal at the Commonwealth Games in Manchester, England.
- 2002: Virgin Blue begins operating in Tasmania offering introductory $66 one-way fares to Melbourne
- 2002 (1 September): Tasmania's fast ferries Spirit of Tasmania I and II replace original Spirit of Tasmania on Bass Strait trade.
- 2002 (12 October): Tasmanian Tim Hawkins killed in Bali bombing
- 2002: Deregulated shop trading hours begin
- 2003 (January): People urged by Tasmanian Fire Service to abandon their Australia Day long-weekend plans and prepare their homes for a potential firestorm as a number of fires pose the worst fire threat in 30 years
- 2003: Official opening of the restored Queenstown to Regatta Point railway line West Coast Wilderness Railway. (1,067 mm (3 ft 6 in))
- 2003: Attempted hijack of a Qantas flight from Melbourne to Launceston
- 2003: Federal Hotels gets exclusive control of state's gaming machines for 15 years with a further 5-year option
- 2003: Richard Butler becomes Tasmania's new governor
- 2003: Regina Bird wins reality-TV show Big Brother, becomes first Tasmanian to do so
- 2003: Tasmania passed some of the most progressive relationship laws in the world including same-sex adoptions and registration of 'significant' relationships
- 2003: Engagement of Tasmania's Mary Donaldson to Denmark's Crown Prince Frederik
- 2004 (13 January): Spirit of Tasmania III makes its first voyage from Sydney to Devonport
- 2004: State Government announces legislation to legalise brothels; leading to a back flip in 2005 when the government chose to ban brothels altogether.
- 2004 (14 May): Wedding of Tasmania's Mary Donaldson to Denmark's Crown Prince Frederik in Copenhagen.
- 2004 (20 May): Premier Jim Bacon dies in Hobart of lung cancer
- 2004 (8 August): Tasmanian governor Richard Butler resigns at the request the premier, who agreed to pay "compensation" of $600,000 in lost salary
- 2005 (15 October): Tasmanian Mary Donaldson and Crown Prince Frederik give birth to a male infant Prince Christian who will be in the line of succession to the Danish throne
- 2006 (26 April): Beaconsfield mine collapse—One miner killed, two trapped underground for a fortnight.
- 2006 (27 August): Final crossing of the Spirit of Tasmania III from Sydney to Devonport
- 2011 (22 January) : The Museum of Old and New Art (MONA) opens to the public.
- 2012 : Tasmania's largest company, Gunns, enters voluntary administration.

== See also ==
- History of Hobart
- Historical bibliographies of Tasmania

== References and sources ==
Sources

- Alexander, Alison, ed. (2005). The Companion to Tasmanian History. Hobart, Tasmania: Centre for Tasmanian Historical Studies, University of Tasmania. ISBN 1-86295-223-X. OCLC 61888464.
- Robson, L. L. (1983). A History of Tasmania. Volume I. Van Diemen's Land From the Earliest Times to 1855. Melbourne: Oxford University Press. ISBN 0-19-554364-5.
- Robson, L. L. (1991). A History of Tasmania. Volume II. Colony and State From 1856 to the 1980s. Melbourne: Oxford University Press. ISBN 0-19-553031-4.
- Fenton, James. A history of Tasmania from its discovery in 1642 to the present time. London: Macmillan and Co., 1884. (link)
