= The Companion to Tasmanian History =

Encyclopedia of history of Tasmania

- Editor: Alison Alexander
- Language: English
- Subject: Tasmania
- Genre: Non-fiction
- Publisher: Centre for Tasmanian Historical Studies; University of Tasmania
- Publication date: 2005
- ISBN: 1-86295-223-X
- OCLC: 61888464

The Companion to Tasmanian History was a book produced in 2005 by the Centre for Tasmanian Historical Studies at the University of Tasmania, in conjunction with the Tasmanian Government celebrations of the Bicentenary of Tasmania.

The project to compile the volume began 2002 with an editorial committee comprising Michael Roe, Henry Reynolds, Stefan Petrow and Alison Alexander from the University of Tasmania, as well as Michael Sprod of Astrolabe Books, and Barbara Valentine from Launceston.

The alphabetical section contains some 1073 articles ranging through biographical sketches, places and issues that cover the whole length of Tasmanian history.

== Thematic articles ==
| Title | Author |
|---|---|
| Aboriginality | Jim Everett |
| Britishness | Peter Boyce |
| Class | Shayne Breen |
| Convicts | Hamish Maxwell-Stewart |
| Economy | Bruce Felmingham |
| Episodes of Thought | Michael Roe |
| Exile | Richard Davis |
| Gender | Alison Alexander |
| Healing | Eric Ratcliff |
| Identity | Henry Reynolds |
| Monuments, Museums and Memory | Marilyn Lake |
| Place | Tim Jetson |
| Religion | Richard Ely |
| Shelter | Barry McNeill and Eric Ratcliff |
| The State | Stefan Petrow |
| Urbanisation | Graeme Davison |
| Van Diemen's Land | Ros Haynes |

== Appendices ==
As well as the articles, the volume contains Appendices of Aboriginal places names, and all Government officials and members of Parliament since establishment of the colony.

== Publication details ==
Alexander, Alison, ed. (2005). The Companion to Tasmanian History. Centre for Tasmanian Historical Studies, University of Tasmania. ISBN 1-86295-223-X. OCLC 61888464.

There was a digital version of the companion produced in 2006.

== See also ==
- History of Tasmania
- Historical bibliographies of Tasmania
- Historical Encyclopedia of WA
