= Nick Vine Hall =

Nicholas John Vine Hall AM (17 August 1944 – 31 October 2006), generally known as Nick Vine Hall, was a recognised Australian authority in the fields of family history, genealogy and heraldry, and an enthusiastic champion of family history research in Australia.

Nick Vine Hall was born in Darlinghurst, Sydney, and educated at Sydney Grammar School, before working for CSR Limited in sales and marketing for 16 years, where he became the CSR Limited Australia Sugar Sales Manager in 1972.

In 1966 Nick met and married Patricia (Tricia) Pryor, who had recently arrived from the UK. They subsequently had two children. John Kenyon, Born April 1967, and Katy Jane, Born December 1968. Nick and Tricia separated in 1987 and divorced in 1989.

As a young man, Nick had been told he was a descendant of James Cook, which provoked an interest in his family history. When he eventually made his first trip abroad, he visited his English relatives, and traced the family history, that showed that he was eighth cousin to that famed navigator, and also descended from Edmund Blacket, the third colonial architect of NSW. He also discovered a couple of skeletons in the family cupboard – a drunkard and an ancestor hanged for high treason.

That trip to England led Vine Hall to leave CSR, and adopt genealogy as his lifetime's work and passion. He joined the Society of Australian Genealogists in 1971, and, in 1978, was appointed a director, a position he held for a decade.

Vine Hall had a considerable flair for public relations and marketing skills, which he used to popularise family history research, and make social history a matter of serious pursuit in Australia.

In 1979, he became the ABC Radio's resident genealogist, answering listeners' questions and giving advice. He also contributed many articles to rural newspapers such as The Land, and was an invited guest speaker at many national and international genealogical and family history conferences, as well as at local societies throughout Australia, and on several Pacific cruise vessels.

In 1985, Vine Hall published Tracing Your Family History in Australia: A National Guide to Sources, which is still recognised as the most complete authoritative publication of genealogical sources in Australia, and is now in its 3rd edition. He also self-published many of the other 35 books, CDs, charts and articles accredited to him.

In 1987, the Australian Federation of Family History Organisations (AFFHO) bestowed on him the N.T. Hansen Award for Significant Contribution to Family History.

In July 1988, Vine Hall joined the Heraldry and Genealogy Society of Canberra (HAGSOC), and was an occasional member over subsequent years.

In 1988, he met Patricia Barth on a blind date at a bicentennial ball in Melbourne, and they married in 1991. He subsequently moved to Melbourne where she ran her business.

In 1991, Vine Hall initiated the British Isles Directories Project, 1769–1936, which is transferring some 20 million names from printed trade directories onto microfiche. In 1995, he also initiated the Ships Picture Research Service generating an index of more than 160,000 images.

Vine Hall was the chairman of the Australian Federation of Family History Organisations Census Working Party, which persuaded the Australian government to trial the voluntary retention of the 2001 national census. In February 2006, legislative changes made this trial a permanent feature of all future Australian censuses.

Vine Hall was a founding member of the Huguenot Society of Australia established in 2003. His last published work was The Happy Huguenots – Parts 1, 2 & 3, a family history which was Highly Commended when entered in the Alexander Henderson Award for 2006.

In 2006, Vine Hall was made a Life Member of the Society of Australian Genealogists.

After a long battle with cancer, Nick Vine Hall died in October 2006 at the age of 62 at the Bethlehem Hospital, South Caulfield, and was survived by Patricia, and his ex-wife, Tricia, and their children, John and Katy, as well as five grandchildren. His funeral service was held at the St Thomas's Anglican Church in North Sydney on 9 November 2006.

In June 2007, Vine Hall was appointed a Member of the Order of Australia for Services to Genealogy. The award was made effective from 18 July 2006, prior to his death.
