= Lionel Gilbert =

Australian historian

Lionel Gilbert OAM
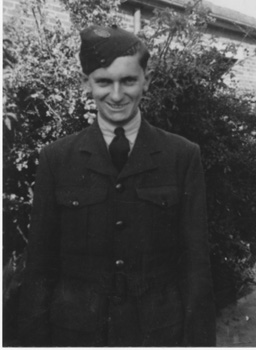
- Gilbert in Burwood, N.S.W. while home on leave from Royal Australian Air Force radar operator's school in July 1943
- Born: Lionel Arthur Gilbert; 8 December 1924; Burwood, Sydney
- Died: 28 January 2015 (aged 90); Armidale, New South Wales
- Education: University of New England (B.A., Ph.D.)
- Occupations: Historian, author, curator, lecturer, biographer
- Known for: Applied, natural, and local history of Australia and New South Wales
- Awards: Medal of the Order of Australia (OAM), 1995; Centenary Medal, 2001; Doctor of Letters (Hon. D. Litt.), University of New England, 2008

Lionel Arthur Gilbert OAM CF (8 December 1924 – 28 January 2015) was an Australian historian, author, curator, lecturer, and biographer, specializing in applied, natural, and local history. Born in Burwood, New South Wales, he studied at Sydney Teachers College and, beginning in 1946, worked as a teacher and later a headmaster in state schools in various locations around New South Wales until 1961. In 1963 Gilbert graduated from the University of New England with a Bachelor of Arts in History. That same year, he was appointed a lecturer and curator at the Armidale Teachers' College Museum of Education, in which capacity he served until his retirement in 1984, overseeing several expansions of the museum and establishment of a historical research centre.

During his time with the college, Gilbert published a number of articles, papers, and books, many of them focusing on local history of New South Wales, including the state's New England area. He attained a Doctor of Philosophy (PhD) in Botanical History from the University of New England in 1972. After retirement, Gilbert authored several books on Australian natural history, including biographies of three Australian botanists and a history of Sydney's Royal Botanic Gardens. In recognition of his work in education and history, he was selected as a fellow by several historical organizations. In 1995 he was awarded the Medal of the Order of Australia, a Centenary Medal in 2001, and in 2007 with an honorary Doctor of Letters by the University of New England.

== Early life and career with state schools ==
Gilbert was born in Burwood, a suburb of Sydney, on 8 December 1924. His primary and secondary education took place at Burwood Primary School, Homebush Boys High School, and Fort Street High School, receiving a leaving certificate from the latter. After graduation, Gilbert took temporary employment at Gowings Men's Store in Sydney. In 1942, he received a Teacher's Scholarship to Sydney Teachers College, where he trained for one year to be a school teacher.

In 1943, Gilbert enlisted in the Royal Australian Air Force, joining 570 other Teachers College students who served in the armed forces during World War II, 68 of whom were killed during the conflict. Assigned as a radar operator in Arnhem Land, Gilbert served until 1946.

After his discharge from the military, Gilbert was employed as secondary school teacher at Nabiac Central School from 1946 until 1954. In 1955, he was appointed Deputy Headmaster of Wauchope Primary School, and served in that capacity until 1960. That year, he accepted an appointment as headmaster of Rocky River Primary School near Uralla, New South Wales, a position he held until 1961.

While at Nabiac, Gilbert met Margaret Roberts and the two married in 1949. Their daughter Anne was born in 1960.

== Academia and curator career ==
In 1955, Gilbert enrolled as an external student at the University of New England in the first class of the university's external studies program. In 1961, he was appointed by the university as a Research and Information Officer in the Department of External Studies. In this capacity, Gilbert taught weekend classes on the methodology of local history for the university's adult education department throughout the northwest area of New South Wales. In 1963, he graduated with a Bachelor of Arts in History with First Class Honors, submitting his thesis on the history of botanical knowledge of the eastern seaboard of Australia for the years 1788–1815.

In July 1963, Gilbert accepted an appointment as lecturer in applied history and curator with the Armidale Teachers' College (later College of Advanced Education) Museum of Education. Holding the position for 21 years, he guided expansion of the facility to better present the history of education in Australia. Between 1976 and 1980 he supervised the relocation to the museum of three historic school buildings from Armidale High School and Dumaresq Public School. In addition, Gilbert designed courses in applied and local history for internal and external students of the college, which became the Armidale College of Advanced Education in 1971.

In 1974, Gilbert successfully requested an Innovations Grant from the Schools Commission to establish a Historical Resources Centre at the college. Opened in 1976 with Gilbert as its first director, the centre's goal was to provide education on the history of New England to primary, secondary, tertiary, and postgraduate students, and community groups.

Gilbert recalled in 2008 that between 1975 and 1978, 5,758 primary or secondary pupils toured the museum on field trips. A further 1,653 adults visited during that time to conduct historical or genealogical research at the museum or the Historical Resources Centre. In 1981 the Museums Association of Australia recognised the museum with a certificate of merit for its, "authenticity and detail in building, display and education."

In 1972, Gilbert was named chair of the school's newly formed Department of History. He attained the position of Acting Deputy Principal for the college before retiring in June 1984.

In 1967, Gilbert assisted the National Trust of Australia and the Australian National University's Department of Adult Education with a series of lectures and exhibits on local history of the New England area. Held in Armidale, the series helped establish a local chapter of the National Trust and the subsequent preservation of several historical colonial buildings in the area.

While at the college, Gilbert pursued post-graduate studies at New England and received a Doctor of Philosophy (PhD) in Botanical History in 1972, with his thesis titled Botanical investigation of New South Wales, 1811–1880. Also in 1972, he was awarded a Churchill Fellowship to the U.K. for four weeks to study how museums in the U.K. contributed to general education.

== Other work ==
In 1962, Gilbert succeeded Eric Dunlop as Honorary Curator of the Armidale City Council's Folk Museum, serving in the position until 1982. When the museum reached capacity in its original facility, he joined the Armidale town clerk in a successful petition to the Department of Education for New South Wales to relocate the museum into the nearby Hillgrove School. Opened in 1977, the new facility is known as the Museum of Rural Life and Industry. Beginning in 1975, he served on the New South Wales State Archives Authority.

During his career at the college, Gilbert authored or co-authored a number of papers and books, particularly on Australian biographical, genealogical, and local history. In 1974, Gilbert joined William Patrick Driscoll, Alan Sutherland, and David Rose in publishing History Around Us: An Enquiry Approach to Local History, a book on historical research targeted at younger readers. The book was re-issued in 1984. In 1978, Gilbert and co-author Elwyn Sydney Elphick wrote a book titled of Forty-three and Seven: A Short Illustrated History of the First Fifty Years of Teacher Education in Armidale : Armidale Teachers' College, 1928–1971 and Armidale College of Advanced Education 1971–1978 to commemorate the school's 50-year jubilee celebration. In 1980, two books by Gilbert were published: A Grave Look at History: Glimpses of a Vanishing Form of Folk Art and New England from Old Photographs. The former studied graveyard monuments and was representative of Gilbert's lifelong interest in studying and documenting epitaphs. The latter book focused on local history of New South Wales. From 1966, he contributed a series of articles to the Australian Dictionary of Biography.

== Post retirement work, professional associations, and honors ==
Gilbert continued to write in retirement, often focusing on natural history. In 1985, 1992, and 2001, he respectively authored books on botanists William Woolls, Herman Rupp, and Joseph Maiden. In 1986, his book on the history of Sydney's Royal Botanic Gardens was published. Two years after its publication, Gilbert was appointed an Honorary Research Associate of the gardens. He was also a patron of the Australian National Museum of Education and a member of Australia's National Trust.

Gilbert was named a Fellow of the Society of Australian Genealogists in 1955, an Honorary Fellow of the Royal Australian Historical Society in 1997, and a Fellow of the Federation of Australian Historical Societies in 2007. On 12 June 1995 he was recognised with the Medal of the Order of Australia (OAM), "In recognition of service to the community as a researcher and curator of local history in the New England region." On 1 January 2001 he was awarded the Centenary Medal, "For service to the community through education and local history." The University of New England presented Gilbert with an honorary Doctor of Letters (Hon. D. Litt.) in 2008. Also in 2008, he contributed a historical essay on the Auchinleck-Ross family of New England to the biographical compendium, New England Lives III. Gilbert served as president of the Armidale and District Historical Society and has been honored with Freedom of the City of Armidale.

== Personal life and death ==
Gilbert and his wife, Margaret, resided in Armidale, New South Wales from 1961. He died in Armidale on 28 January 2015 and was survived by his wife, daughter Anne, son-in-law Tony Bennett, and grandson Alexei.

== Awards and professional elections ==
- 1955 Fellow, Society of Australian Genealogists
- 1972 Churchill Fellowship
- 1988 Honorary Research Associate, Royal Botanic Gardens, Sydney
- 1995 Medal of the Order of Australia
- 1997 Honorary Fellow, Royal Australian Historical Society
- 2001 Centenary Medal
- 2007 Fellow, Federation of Australian Historical Societies
- 2008 Doctor of Letters, University of New England
- Freedom of the City of Armidale, New South Wales
- President of the Armidale and District Historical Society

== Selected publications ==
- Elphick, Elwyn Sydney; Lionel Arthur Gilbert (1978). Forty-three and Seven: A Short Illustrated History of the First Fifty Years of Teacher Education in Armidale : Armidale Teachers' College, 1928–1971 and Armidale College of Advanced Education 1971–1978. Armidale, New South Wales: Armidale College of Advanced Education. p. 85. OCLC 220377802.
- Gilbert, Lionel Arthur (1980). A Grave Look at History: Glimpses of a Vanishing Form of Folk Art. Sydney: John Ferguson. p. 143. ISBN 9780909134297. OCLC 456553652.
- Gilbert, Lionel Arthur (1980). New England from Old Photographs. Sydney: John Ferguson. p. 144. ISBN 9780909134297. OCLC 8953985.
- Gilbert, Lionel Arthur; William Patrick Driscoll; Alan Sutherland; David Rose (1984). History Around Us: An Enquiry Approach to Local History (2nd ed.). North Ryde, New South Wales: Methuen Australia. p. 140. ISBN 9780454006766. OCLC 27489941.
- Gilbert, Lionel Arthur (1985). William Woolls, 1814-1893: "A Most Useful Colonist". Canberra: Mulini Press. p. 138. ISBN 9780949910158. OCLC 247984779.
- Gilbert, Lionel Arthur (23 June 1986). The Royal Botanic Gardens, Sydney: A History, 1816-1985. Melbourne; New York: Oxford University Press. p. 210. ISBN 9780195547191. OCLC 14694184.
- Gilbert, Lionel Arthur (1987). Mr Smith, Mr Jones and a Time of Bliss. Armidale, New South Wales: Armidale College of Advanced Education. ISBN 9780959389357. OCLC 27623153.
- Gilbert, Lionel Arthur (1992). The Orchid Man: The Life, Work and Memoirs of the Rev. H.M.R. Rupp, 1872-1956. Kenthurst, New South Wales: Kangaroo Press. p. 248. ISBN 9780864174154. OCLC 27240057.
- Gilbert, Lionel Arthur (1 March 2001). The Little Giant: The Life & Work of Joseph Henry Maiden, 1859-1925. Sydney: Kardoorair Press in association with Royal Botanic Gardens. p. 429. ISBN 9780908244447. OCLC 54078075.
- Gilbert, Lionel Arthur (2005). The Last Word: Two Centuries of Australian Epitaphs. Armidale, New South Wales: Kardoorair Press. p. 451. ISBN 9780908244645. OCLC 65526598.
