= Richmond Villa =

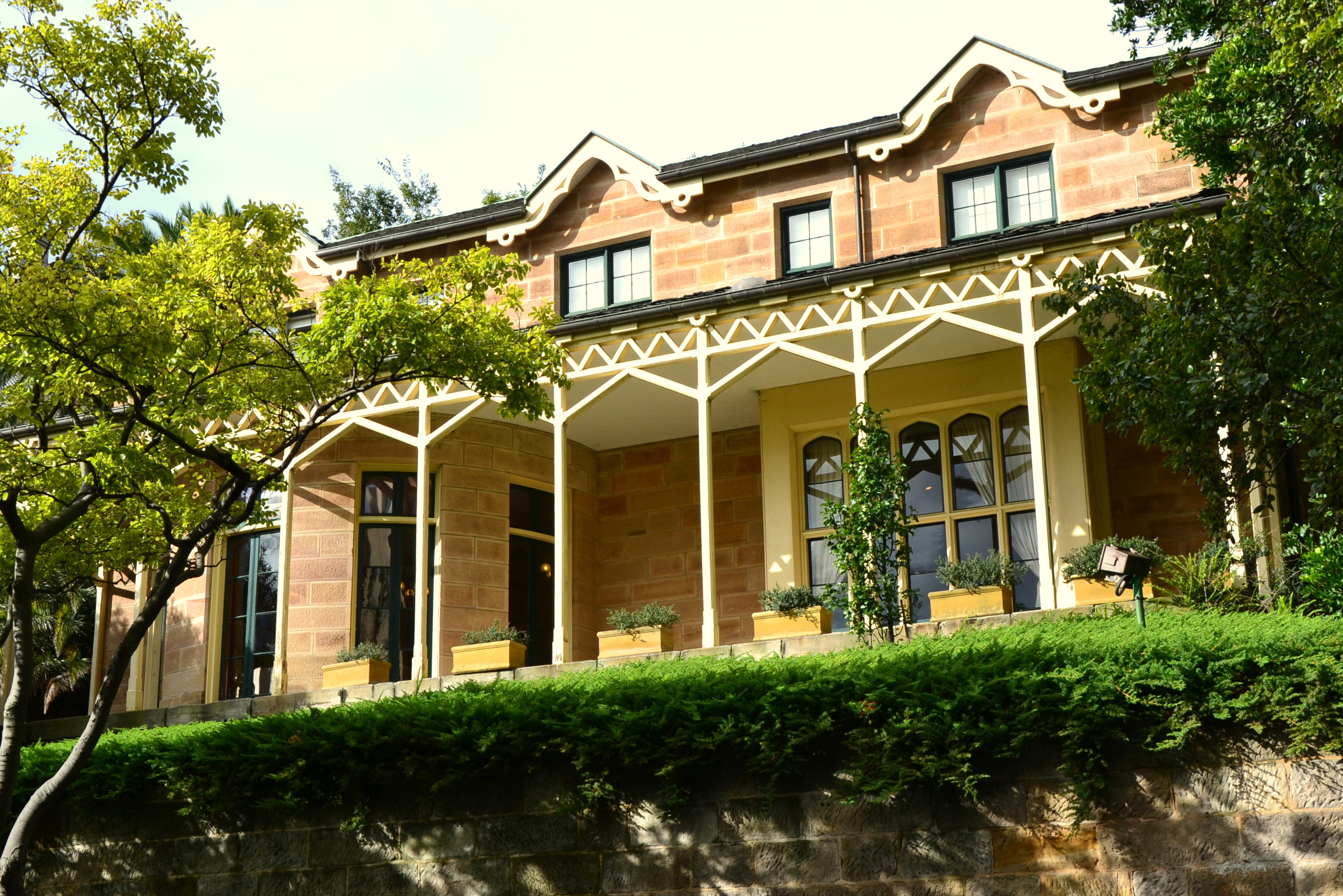
- Richmond Villa

- Location within Sydney

General information
- Status: Completed
- Type: House
- Architectural style: Gothic Revival
- Location: 116–122 Kent Street, Millers Point, New South Wales, Australia
- Coordinates: 33°51′46″S 151°12′10″E
- Current tenants: Society of Australian Genealogists
- Construction started: 1849
- Completed: 1851

Design and construction
- Architect: Mortimer Lewis
- Architecture firm: New South Wales Colonial Architect

Website
- Richmond Villa at Sydney Living Museums

Register of the National Estate
- Official name: Richmond Villa
- Type: Historic
- Designated: 21 March 1978
- Reference no.: 2347

New South Wales Heritage Database (Local Government Register)
- Official name: House "Richmond Villa" Including Interior
- Type: Built (local register)
- Criteria: a., b., c., d., e., f., g.
- Designated: 14 December 2012
- Reference no.: I923

Richmond Villa is a heritage-listed home located in Millers Point, an inner city suburb of Sydney, in the City of Sydney local government area of New South Wales, Australia. It was designed by the notable colonial architect Mortimer Lewis in the Gothic Revival style. The villa was listed on the City of Sydney local heritage register on 14 December 2012 and is located adjacent to Glover cottages, which are listed on the New South Wales State Heritage Register.

== History and description ==
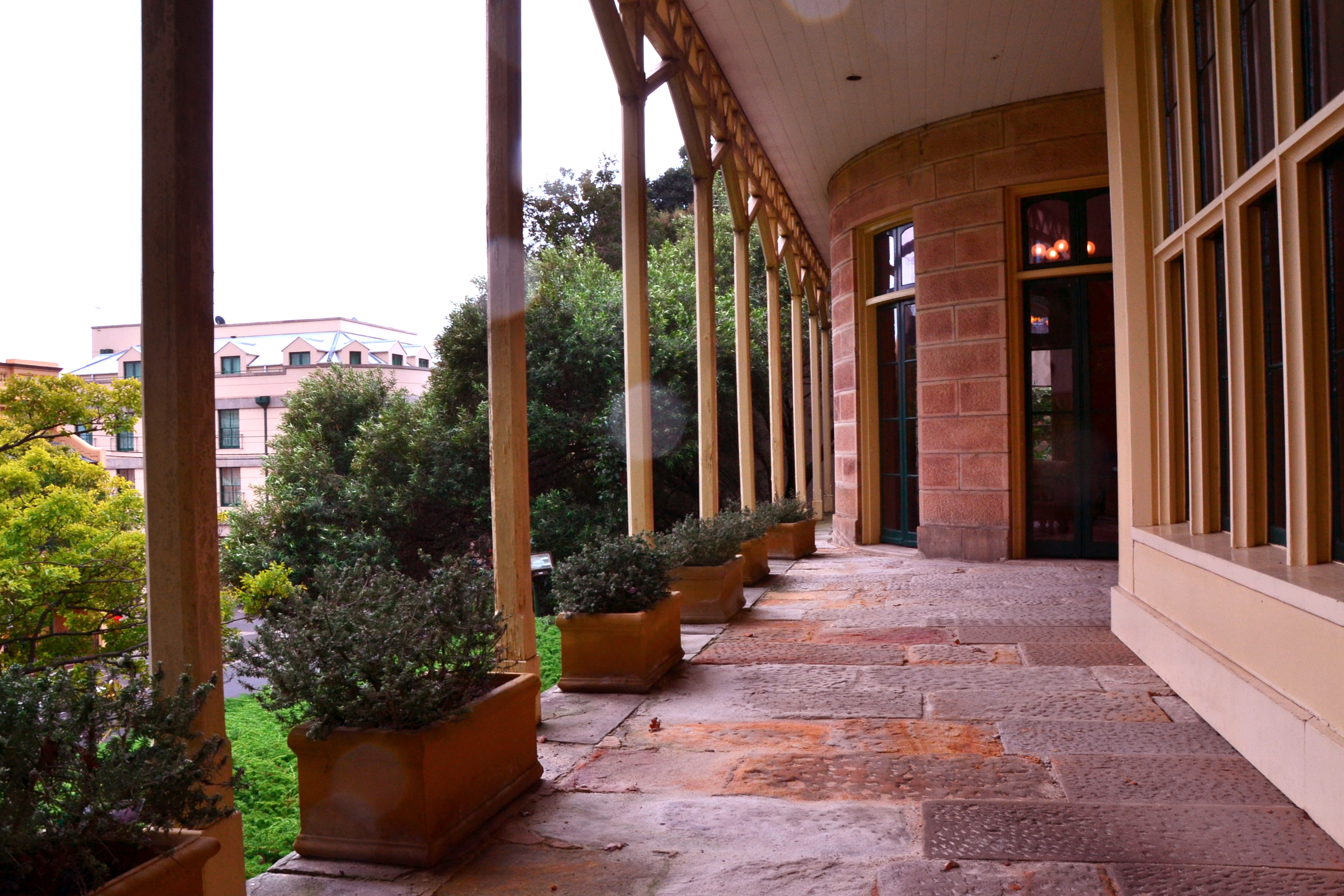
Verandah

Richmond Villa is now located on top of an artificial rock shelf or escarpment along the east side of Kent Street, facing west. This rock shelf may have been created by stone quarrying that took place between 1810 and the 1830s. It soon became the site of stone cottages, some of which still survive, but Richmond Villa started its life in a very different place.

In 1849, Mortimer Lewis bought three plots of land behind Macquarie Street, facing The Domain. On this property he built his own home, which he called Richmond Villa. It is one of the few examples of Lewis's residential work, since his buildings were generally non-residential. He designed Richmond Villa in a Gothic Revival style, as he had done with Bronte House. The ground floor contained a high veranda with zig-zag lattice-like detailing which contrasted with the building's asymmetrical plan and fenestration.

The house was leased to a number of people, including from 1876 to 1893, George Neville Griffiths, member for East Sydney 1882-1885. The house was used as an annex to NSW Parliament House until 1975. It was then dismantled to make way for extensions to Parliament House, and re-erected in Kent Street, Millers Point, in 1977.

It is the current office of the Society of Australian Genealogists.

== Heritage listing ==
On 14 December 2012 the house was listed on the City of Sydney local heritage register with the following statement of significance:

Of architectural significance as one of the primary examples of the Australian domestic Gothic Revival. A successful example of careful dismantling and re-erection and of adaptive re-use. Part of an important streetscape of early residential buildings. Richmond Villa is of state historical and aesthetic significance as a fine example of a Gothic Revival Cottage designed by the Colonial Architect Mortimer Lewis. The Villa represents the spread of architectural ideas through the colonies via pattern books and is a rare example of a Colonial Architect designing for himself. The Villa demonstrates one of the earliest transitions between the Georgian style (basis of plan) and the neogothic style (basis of elevations). The Villa represents the changes to conservation philosophy since the introduction of the Burra Charter and provides evidence of the need to expand Parliament House in the late 19th century. The Villa is a successful and rare example of careful dismantling, re-erection and adaptive re-use of a state significant building.

— Statement of significance, New South Wales Heritage Database.

On 21 March 1978 the house was listed on the (now defunct) Register of the National Estate.

== See also ==
- Australian residential architectural styles
