= Alison Alexander =

Australian biographer and public historian

Alison Alexander FAHA
- Born: Alison Ann Pillinger; 23 September 1949 (age 76); Hobart, Tasmania, Australia
- Education: University of Tasmania
- Occupations: Biographer; public historian
- Writing career
- Period: 1979–
- Notable awards: National Biography Award; 2014 The Ambitions of Jane Franklin
- Website: alisonalexander.com.au

Alison Ann Alexander (née Pillinger, born 23 September 1949) is an Australian biographer and public historian. She is the editor of The Companion to Tasmanian History, published in 2005.

Alison Ann Pillinger was born in Hobart, Tasmania on 23 September 1949. She was educated at the University of Tasmania (UTAS), graduating with a BA (Hons) in 1974. Her thesis, The Australia of the Billabong Books, was published by Angus & Robertson as Billabong's Author. She received a Master of Arts and PhD, both from UTAS, the latter for her thesis, The Public Role of Women in Tasmania, 1803–1914.

She has written a number of commissioned histories of places and organisations in Tasmania. She is president of Convict Women's Press and edits the journal of the Tasmanian Historical Research Association.

== Awards, honours and recognition ==
Alexander won the 2014 National Biography Award and was shortlisted for the History Book Award at the 2013 Queensland Literary Awards for The Ambitions of Jane Franklin. She won the 2022 Dick and Joan Green Family Award for Tasmanian History for The Waking Dream of Art.

Alexander was named an Honorary Fellow of the Australian Academy of the Humanities in 2023. She was inducted onto the Tasmanian Honour Roll of Women for her contribution to cultural heritage and literature in the same year.

== Select publications ==
- Alexander, Alison (1979). Billabong's author: the life of Mary Grant Bruce. London: Angus & Robertson. ISBN 978-0-207-13766-2.
- —— (1987). Governors' ladies: the wives and mistresses of Van Diemen's Land governors. Sandy Bay, Tasmania, Australia: Tasmanian Historical Research Association. ISBN 978-0-909479-03-9.
- —— (1994). A mortal flame: Marie Bjelke Petersen, Australian romance writer, 1874-1969. Hobart [Australia]: Blubber Head Press. ISBN 978-0-908528-25-7.
- ——; Torney-Parlicki, Prue (2001). A wealth of women: Australian women's lives from 1788 to the present. Sydney: Duffy and Snellgrove : Distributed by Pan Macmillan. ISBN 978-1-876631-09-3.
- —— (2013). The ambitions of Jane Franklin. Crows Nest, NSW: Allen & Unwin. ISBN 978-1-74237-569-4.
- —— (2019). The Waking Dream of Art : Patricia Giles, Painter. Dynnyrne, Tasmania: Pillinger Press. ISBN 978-0-64836-152-7.
- —— (2021). A Salute to Max Angus : Tasmanian Painter. Lindisfarne, Tasmania: Forty South Publishing. ISBN 978-0-64897-276-1.
