= Glover cottages =

Buildings in New South Wales, Australia

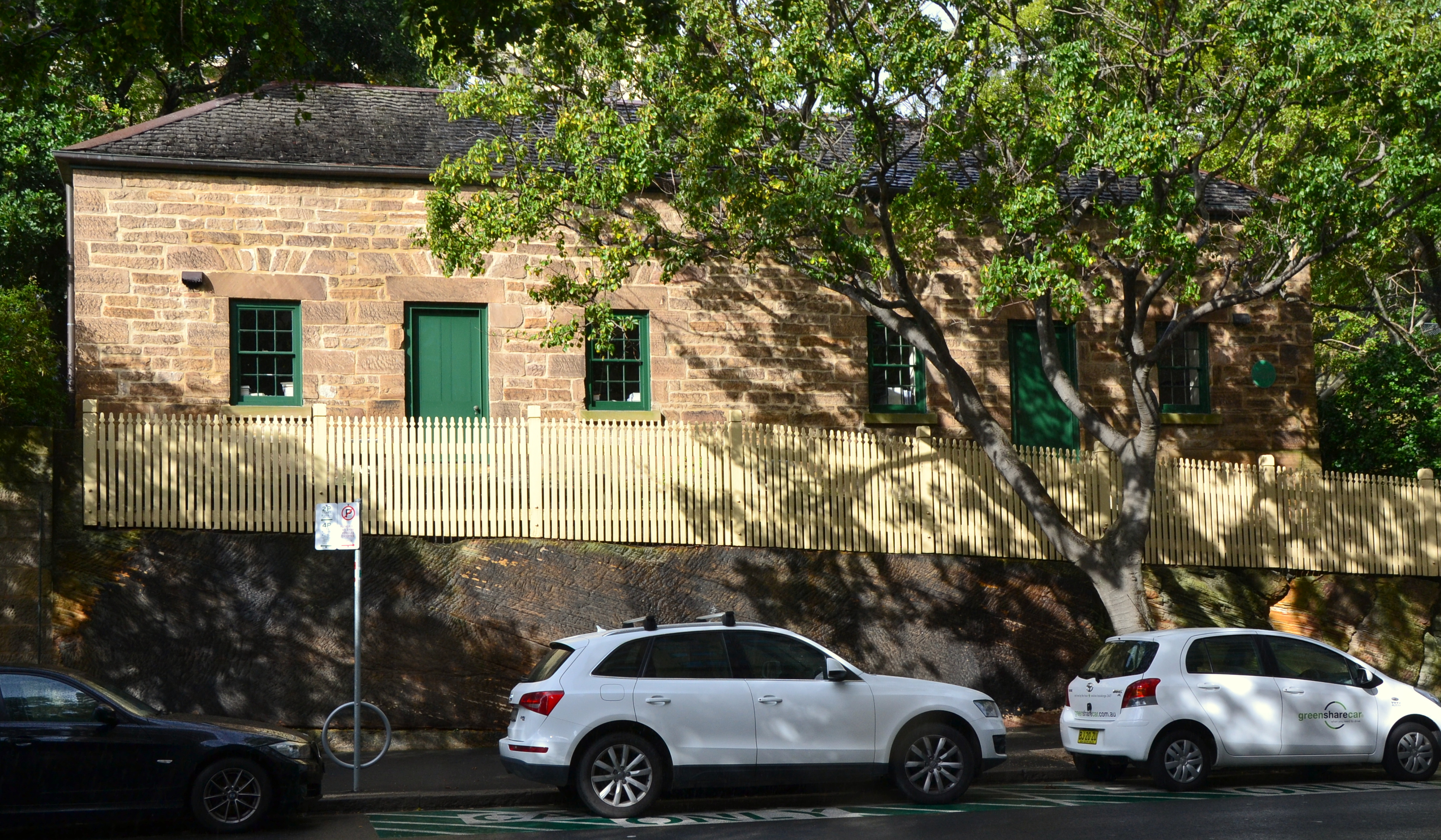
- Glover cottages as seen from Kent Street

- Location within east Sydney
- Alternative names: The Ark

General information
- Status: Completed
- Type: Offices (current use); Private residences (former use)
- Architectural style: Colonial Georgian
- Location: 124–134 Kent Street, Millers Point, New South Wales, Australia
- Coordinates: 33°51′48″S 151°12′10″E
- Current tenants: Australian Institute of International Affairs
- Construction started: 1820
- Completed: 1838
- Client: Edward Ewen; Thomas Glover
- Owner: Government of New South Wales
- Landlord: via State Property Authority

Design and construction
- Main contractor: James Pashley

Register of the National Estate
- Official name: Glover Cottages
- Type: Historic
- Designated: 21 March 1978
- Reference no.: 2164

New South Wales Heritage Database (Local Government Register)
- Official name: Terrace Group "Glover Cottages" Including Interiors
- Type: Built (local register)
- Criteria: a., b., c., d., e., f., g.
- Designated: 14 December 2012
- Reference no.: I925

The Glover cottages are two semi-detached cottages in Kent Street, Millers Point, a suburb of Sydney, in New South Wales, Australia. The cottages were completed in the Colonial Georgian style between 1820 and 1838.

== Description and history ==
The Glover cottages are located on an artificial rock shelf on the east side of Kent Street. This rock shelf may have been created by quarrying from 1810 to 1830. The cottages were constructed on the site by Edward Ewen, a cooper. Ewen later sold the property to Thomas Glover, a publican whose activities were centred on Cumberland Street in The Rocks. Glover saw the property primarily as a source of income rather than a primary residence; he duly carried out repairs on the buildings, as well as building two more houses on the site. Thomas Glover died intestate in 1836; after protracted legal proceedings, the property was transferred in 1840 to James Glover, Thomas's son. Property and buildings stayed in the Glover family, being used partly for accommodation and partly as a source of income – which included some demolition and development – until 1900. By this time, the property and cottages were popularly known as The Ark.

After the outbreak of the bubonic plague in Sydney, the property was resumed under the Darling Harbour Wharves Resumptions Act, but it transpired that the cottages and property were never needed for the purposes of this act. In 1979, the cottages were restored for non-residential purposes and a courtyard was created at the rear. The cottages were heritage-listed in 1989, but the listing was later revoked before being restored. They are regarded as being of historical significance as a quality building constructed before the formal granting of the land. They are also an early example of Colonial Georgian design as used in a colonial town, as well as being one of the few remaining examples of small residential buildings that date from the 1820s.

== Heritage listing ==
On 14 December 2012 the cottages were entered on the City of Sydney local government list of the New South Wales Heritage Database with the following statement of significance:

The Glover Cottages are a rare surviving example of a vernacular single storey semi-detached stone cottage dating from the 1820s in inner Sydney. The cottages evidence the pattern of development of Millers Point prior to the formal layout of the streets where vernacular cottages were built on rock ledges, and are evidence of the process of land subdivision prior to the formal granting of titles. The cottages also indicate the standard of building that survived the post plague demolitions and represents the role of the Sydney Harbour Trust, later the MSB in providing housing for its workers.

— Statement of significance, New South Wales Heritage Database.

On 21 March the cottages were listed on the (now defunct) Register of the National Estate.

== Gallery ==
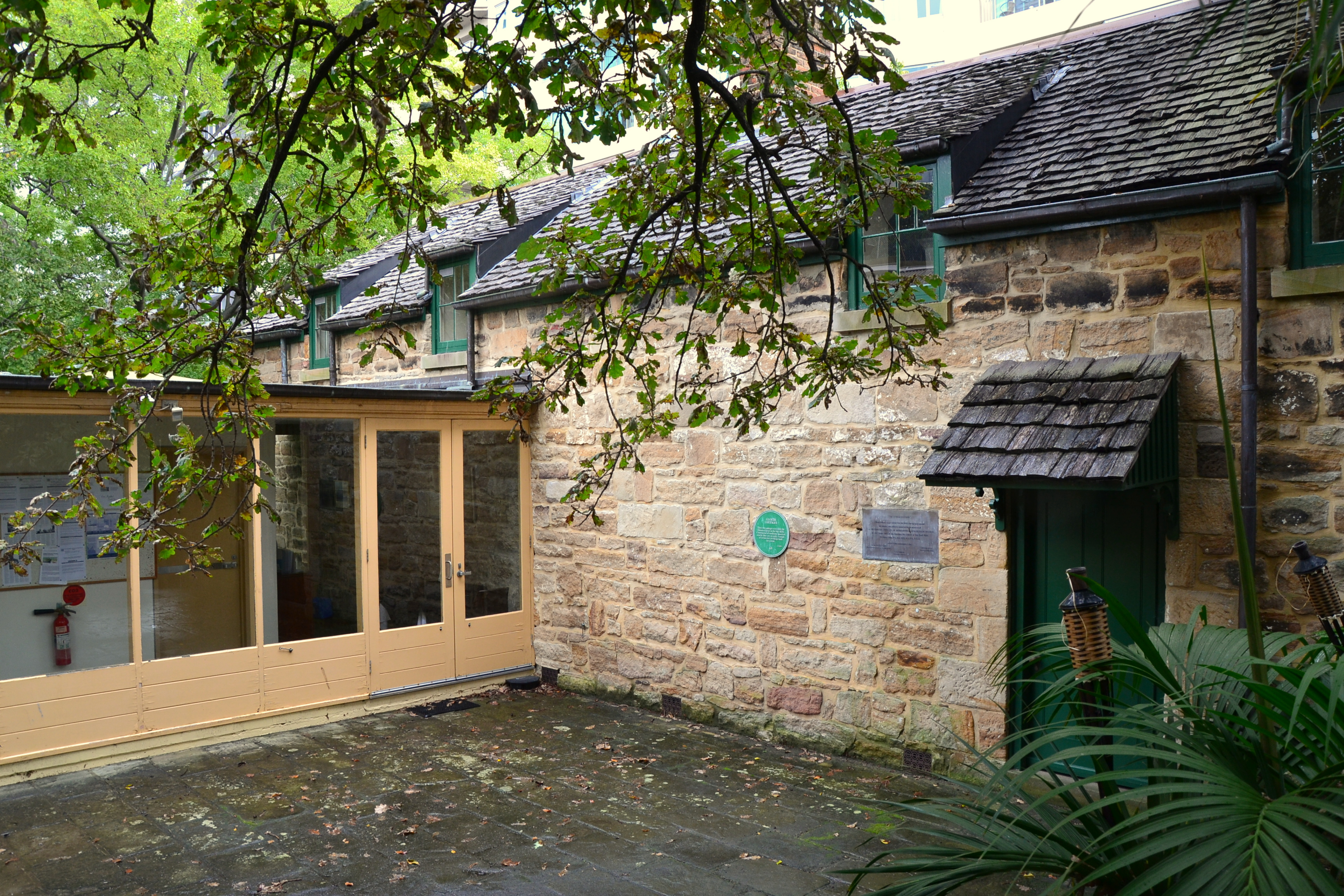
Courtyard at rear of a cottage

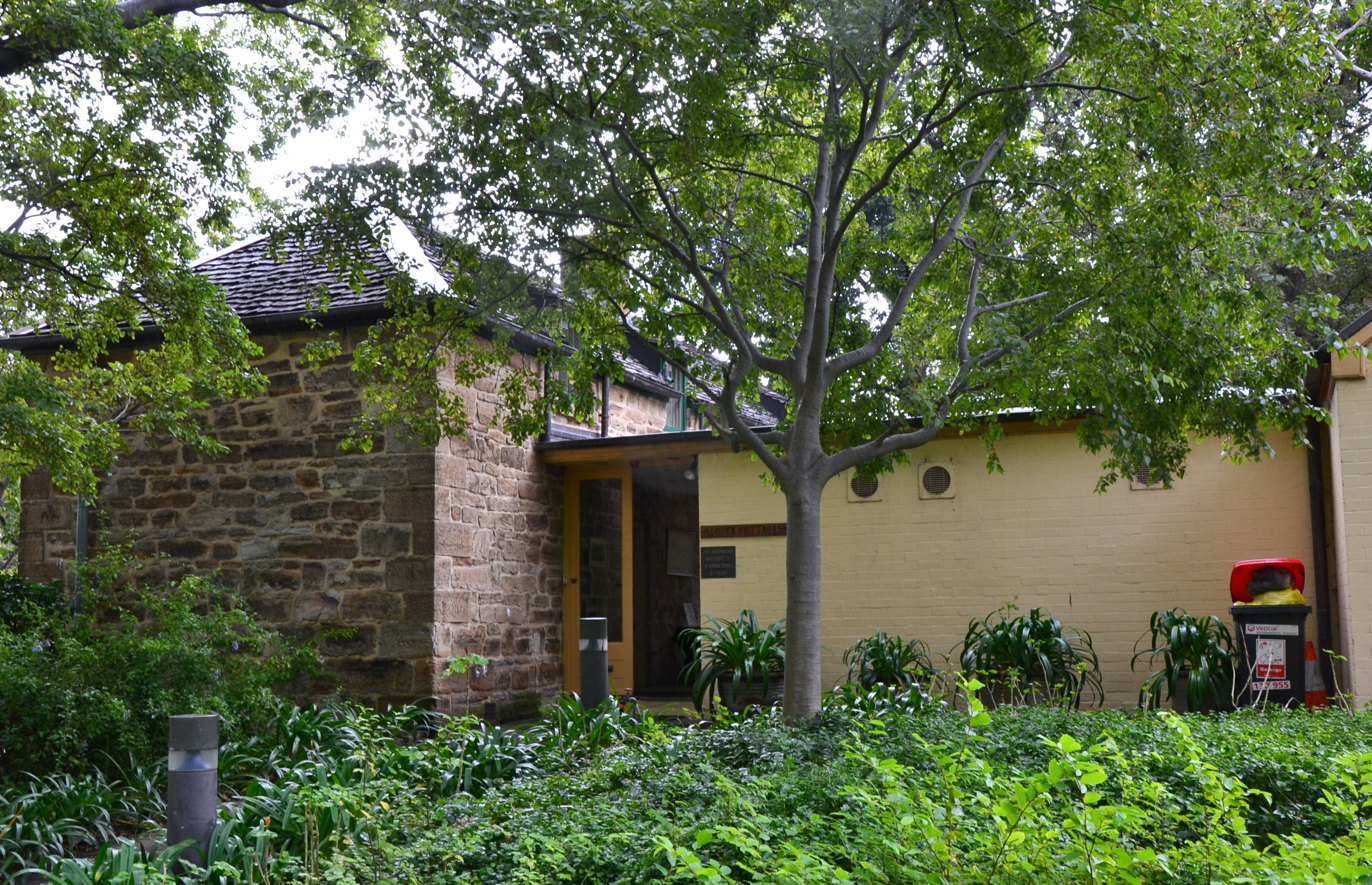
Side view of a cottage

== See also ==
- Australian residential architectural styles
- Richmond Villa
