= Australian Antiquarian Horological Society =

- Abbreviation: AAHS
- Formation: 1975; 51 years ago
- Region served: Australia
- Fields: Horology
- Website: aahs.org.au

The Australian Antiquarian Horological Society (AAHS) is a group for amateur and professional horological enthusiasts

== See also ==
- List of antiquarian societies
