= Federation of Australian Historical Societies =

The Federation of Australian Historical Societies
- Founded: 1977
- Type: peak organisation; historical society; incorporated association
- VAT ID no.: ABN: 89 217 386 291
- Registration no.: A02074 (Associations Incorporation Act 1991 (Australian Capital Territory))
- Location: Canberra, Australia
- Region served: Australia
- Website: www.history.org.au

The Federation of Australian Historical Societies (FAHS) is the peak body for historical societies throughout Australia. It has eight constituent members, one in each of the Australian states and internal self-governing territories. It lobbies governments on behalf of the sector and has formed alliances with other related bodies. It promotes uniform national standards through guides and other publications and fosters historical research, writing and education through fellowships and awards.

== Members ==
The constituent members of FAHS are:

- the Royal Australian Historical Society
- the Royal Historical Society of Victoria Inc
- the Royal Historical Society of Queensland Inc
- the Royal Western Australian Historical Society Inc
- the Tasmanian Historical Research Association Inc
- the Canberra and District Historical Society Inc
- the Historical Society of the Northern Territory Inc and
- the History Trust of South Australia.

== Corporate governance ==
In its current form, the Federation was incorporated on 6 June 1992 under the Associations Incorporation Act 1991 (Australian Capital Territory) with a constitution adopted in Hobart on 22 September 1991. This succeeded an earlier incorporation which formed in 1977.

It is governed between general meetings by a committee which consists of two delegates from each of its constituent members which are the peak bodies representing historical societies in their respective state or internal self-governing territory. The committee holds four meetings a year, three times by teleconference, and once in a represented state or territory on a rotating basis.

The FAHS maintains a part-time office in Canberra.

== History ==
In 1977, the Federation of Australian Historical Societies was formed as a peak council for on-going state-based societies whose origins were in the early years of the 20th century.

=== State historical societies ===
With the close of the colonial period at Federation, a number of state-based historical societies began to be formed: 1901 in New South Wales, the Australian Historical Society; in 1909, the Historical Society of Victoria; in 1913, the Historical Society of Queensland; 1926, the Western Australian Historical Society; in 1926, the South Australian Historical Society (dissolved 1930–31) and, in 1935, the Pioneers Association of South Australia, 1935.

The state societies were "initiated, and in their early years dominated, by male elites, often professional men, interspersed with gifted amateur historians, writers, the occasional professor of history, and the descendants of early settlers. ... The history they recorded was a congratulatory record of progress; undesirable or unrecognised elements such as convicts, Aborigines, working people, and women were left out." As a mark of their status, they sought the patronage of their respective State Governors and most gained a royal charter and added "Royal" to their name: New South Wales in 1918; Victoria in 1952; Queensland in 1959; and Western Australia in 1963.

They began collections whose significance grew over time, they organised regular meetings at which research papers were read and they published journals. "In their promotion of Australian history the societies were generally well ahead of the university and school curricula."

== The Flinders map controversy ==
In 2011, FAHS supported the launch of a campaign for the repatriation of Matthew Flinders' 1804 map, gaining widespread media coverage in Australia and England. The map is in storage at the United Kingdom Hydrographic Office, Taunton. Don Garden as FAHS President was quoted:"It seems the birth certificate of Australia because it was the first time there was a map of Australia drawn up, the first time that title was used. It is a significant part of our history".

== Alliances and associations ==
In 2003, it joined with four other peak industry bodies, Regional Arts Australia, Museums Australia, the Australian Council of National Trusts, the Australian Libraries and Information Association, to form The Regional Cultural Alliance in order to "help regional artists gain greater access to skills development and training as well as present a united front when lobbying government ... to better co-ordinate existing programs for cultural development in the regions and recognise the economic opportunities art and culture create for regional centres."

In 2011, FAHS formed the Australian Heritage Partnership with the Australian Council of National Trusts and Australia ICOMOS.

== Notable associated persons ==
The first president was Rae Else-Mitchell who served from 1977 until 1986.

Fellows have included Emeritus Professor Alan Shaw (1998), Professor Michael Roe (2000), Emeritus Professor Weston Bate (2001), and Lionel Gilbert (2007).

== Publications ==
- Looking to the future: the collection of cultural material by historical societies, by Bronwyn Wilson. FAHS: 2000
- FAHS Heritage Handbook: a guide for historical societies, by Judy Gale Rechner. FAHS: 2002
- Publishing history: a guide for historical societies, by Helen Doyle and Katya Johansen. FAHS: 2006
- Heritage tourism in Australia: a guide for historical societies, by Dr. Dianne Snowden. FAHS: 2008
