= Cambridge Antiquarian Society =

Learned society

The Cambridge Antiquarian Society is a society dedicated to study and preservation of the archaeology, history, and architecture of Cambridgeshire, England.

The society was founded in 1840. Its collections are housed in the Haddon Library on Downing Street in Cambridge, Cambridge University's Museum of Archaeology and Anthropology, and the Cambridgeshire Archives and Local Studies. Collections include archaeological publications, books, and periodicals, over 8,000 photographs, nearly 3,000 lantern slides, over 350 watercolours, and rubbings of monumental brasses.

== See also ==
- List of Antiquarian Societies
