= Tasmanian Historical Research Association =

Tasmanian historical group and publisher

The Tasmanian Historical Research Association is a Hobart based Tasmanian historical group and publisher in existence since 1951.

Earlier groups concerned about history and historical preservation occurred in the 1890s and 1920s. The Royal Society in the 1920s, the Tasmanian Society in the 1930s, then the Historical Society of Tasmania in the 1940s, was another group that preceded the association. The Launceston Royal Society became the Launceston Historical Society in 1988.

The society had its first meeting in 1951. The association has been a publisher of a long lasting Papers and Proceedings (short name: Tas. Hist. Res. Assoc.) and various books on Tasmanian history. The collection of Dan Sprod of the 1971 to 1984 have been digitised on Trove.

The THRA is a constituent member of the Federation of Australian Historical Societies.

== Publications ==
- Papers and Proceedings.
- Alexander, Alison (1987). Governors' ladies: the wives and mistresses of Van Dieman's Land governors. Sandy Bay, Tas.: Tasmanian Historical Research Association. ISBN 0-909479-03-8.
