= Unity (schooner) =

Ship missing off the coast of Tasmania

History
- Fate: Presumed lost 1813

General characteristics
- Sail plan: Schooner

Unity was a ship that went missing in 1813 off the coast of Tasmania, Australia.

Unity was a schooner and was moored in Hobart when on the night of 24 April 1813, between 11pm and midnight, a gang of seven armed convicts boarded the ship. They seized the crew and the ship's owner, William Hobart Mansel, a merchant from Sydney, and held them captive as they sailed the ship down the River Derwent. Off Cape Frederick they released their captives – Mansel, the captain and three seamen – and set them adrift in the ship's boat. Mansel and the crew navigated their way back to Hobart. Unity was never heard from again. A special inquiry hearing on 3 May 1820 in front of Special Commissioner J.T. Bigg, found that the ship had not been seen at any port. The ship was presumed lost.

Of the seven convicts, five had arrived on Indefatigable and two on Guilford in 1812.
