= Historical bibliographies of Tasmania =

Historical bibliographies of Tasmania (also known as Tasmanian historical bibliographies) were a series of books produced by the Centre of Tasmanian Historical Studies and the History Department of the University of Tasmania.

They were based on major regions of Tasmania and the written sources available.

A further four were planned but did not eventuate: North-West, Launceston, Upper Derwent and South East.

== Series ==
- 1. Ely, Richard (Compiler) The History of the Huon, Channel Bruny Island Region: Printed Sources
- 2. Jetson, Tim (Compiler) (1991) History of the Midlands - Central Plateau Region: Printed Sources
- 3. Tim Jetson and Richard Ely, (1995) History of West and South-West Tasmania: A Guide to Printed Sources

== See also ==
- History of Tasmania
