= Australasian Federation of Family History Organisations =

The Australasian Federation of Family History Organisations is an umbrella organisation for family history societies in Australia and New Zealand. It was formed in 1978 "to coordinate and assist the work" of the various societies.

== Publications and conferences ==
AFFHO provides guidelines for member organisations, such as the Code of Ethics used by the Society of Australian Genealogists. It has published a monthly newsletter called Newsflash since March 2001.

It coordinates National Genealogy Congresses every three years, with the 2022 AFFHO National Congress being held in Norfolk Island. AFFHO holds an annual genealogy promotion in August each year.

== Awards ==
In 1987 AFFHO bestowed the first N T Hansen Award for Significant Contribution to Family History on Nick Vine Hall. AFFHO, with Nick Hall as chair of its Census Working Party achieved the inclusion of ability for individuals to have their census data retrieved to enable future genealogical research.

In 1990 the Hansen Award was renamed the AFFHO Award for Meritorious Service to Family History. Winners include Marianne Eastgate (1991), Rosemary and Eric Kopittke (2006), Paul Mackett (2009), and Shauna Hicks (2009). The Queensland Family History Society describes the award as the most prestigious award in the field of family history in Australasia.

AFFHO confers the Nick Vine Hall Award to promote family history journals and newsletters.
