= Society of Australian Genealogists =

- Established: 29 August 1932
- Members: 4,000
- Website: https://www.sag.org.au

The Society of Australian Genealogists (SAG) is an Australian-based non-profit organisation whose principal objective is the advancement of genealogical education.^{[1]} The SAG is the oldest family history society in Australia and holds the largest genealogical archives and research library in the country. The head office, archives and research library are located in Sydney, New South Wales, Australia. The society membership numbers nearly 4,000 members world-wide.

== History ==
In August 1932 it was decided at a well-attended meeting of persons interested in family history to form a Society of Australian Genealogists (SAG). The SAG committee would meet in the Assembly Room of the Education Building in Loftus Street, Sydney. The main objective of the founding members was to form a genealogical research library to collect and preserve the history of the pioneering families of Australia. The SAG also planned to publish a small quarterly magazine covering the activities of the society and other items of interest. The society's first journal, The Australian Genealogist, was published from January 1933 until it was forced to cease publication in 1959 through lack of resources. The SAG is the oldest family history society in Australia, assisting genealogists and family historians in tracing their ancestors for over 80 years.

== Facilities ==
The SAG's Manuscript and Image Collection is held in the archives at Richmond Villa, 120 Kent Street, Sydney. The Manuscript and Image Collection features over 28,000 files containing family papers, pedigrees, photographs, certificates, unpublished research notes, other documents and memorabilia from Australia and overseas, donated by members and their families.

The SAG Library is a genealogical reference and research library with an online searchable catalogue. The library is located at 2/379 Kent Street, Sydney and is open to members and non-members. The library contains a large number of published genealogical material including genealogical books, journals, microfilms, CDs and it also provides online access to the major commercial genealogical websites.

The society is managed by an executive officer and staff under the guidance of a board of directors.

== Activities ==
The principal objective of the SAG is to advance genealogical education. To accomplish this, the society provides a comprehensive educational program, publishes an informative journal and creates a variety of networking opportunities for its members.

The SAG educational program includes seminars, lectures, workshops, discussion groups, and webinars. These program items are designed to promote genealogical skill development, establish high standards of genealogical research, and increase awareness of and interest in family history.

The society's current journal, Descent, was first published in January 1961 and has been published quarterly ever since. The Descent journal is full of informative genealogical information, including articles on family history in Australia and overseas, local history, research strategies and resources.

The Society runs an annual biography writing competition: The Croker Prize, named for two long-standing members. Winners are published in Descent and receive a cash prize. Biography subjects include both common and famous ancestors, such as Raymond Moulton O'Brien.

It is a member of the Australasian Federation of Family History Organisations.

== Notable members ==
Notable members include:

- Carol Baxter (Fellow)
- Nick Vine Hall (Life Member)
- Lionel Gilbert (Fellow)
- Michelle Nichols, OAM

== Publications ==
Throughout its history, the Society has published or contributed to a series of works, including:

- Tracing Your Family History Online for Dummies (2003-2007) 7 editions
- Rookwood Cemetery Transcriptions (2002)
- Society of Australian Genealogists: 1932 - 1982: Golden Jubilee History (1982)
