= Michael Roe (historian) =

Australian historian and academic

Owen Michael Roe FAHA (born 5 February 1931) is an Australian historian and academic, focusing on Australian history.

== Education ==
Roe was educated at Caulfield Grammar School from 1939 to 1948; and he was both the school captain and dux of the school in 1948.

He attended the University of Melbourne, and began studying a combined BA/LL.B. degree. He discontinued his legal studies after his first year, and graduated BA (with Honours) in History on 1 September 1952. He then studied history at Peterhouse, University of Cambridge; and, while studying in Cambridge, Roe was taught by Derek John Mulvaney, an Australian archaeologist known as the "father of Australian archaeology". Roe next undertook doctoral studies in history at the Australian National University on a scholarship. His (1960) Ph.D. dissertation was entitled Society and Thought in Eastern Australia, 1835-1851.

== Career ==
Roe became a professor of history at the University of Tasmania, retiring in 1996. He published several history books during his career, including A Short History of Tasmania and Australia, Britain and Migration 1915-1940.

Roe's fields of research primarily focus on Australian history, British history, North American history, historical archaeology, heritage and cultural conservation, and industrial archaeology. His research objectives included understanding Australia's past, alongside expanding knowledge in psychology, history, heritage, human history, and archaeology.

Roe was elected a Fellow of the Australian Academy of the Humanities in 1977.

=== Research funded by grants ===
Roe received five grants from the University of Tasmania under his name. His funded projects include research on a wide range of Tasmanian individuals and history. From 1985 to 1987, he received a grant to research Herbert William Gepp, an Australian industrialist, his zinc company the Electrolytic Zinc Company of Australasia, and the development and migration commission in the 1920s.

In 1994, Professor Roe received a research grant for the publication of his book Immigration policy and experience in Australia, 1915-1940, which was completed that year.

In 1999, two grants were received for his research on the 1901 Australian General Election as well as research on notable Tasmanian Jane Franklin's personal journals and correspondence. In 2003, a grant was given to finance the book project The Companion to Tasmanian History, a collaborative effort with the Centre for Tasmanian Historical Studies at the University of Tasmania.

== Works ==
- Roe, M., Philip Gidley King, Oxford University Press, (Melbourne), 1963.
- Roe, M., Quest for Authority in Eastern Australia, 1835–1851, Melbourne University Press, (Parkville), 1965.
- Roe, M. (ed.), The Journal and Letters of Captain Charles Bishop on the North-West Coast of America, in the Pacific and in New South Wales, 1794-1799, Cambridge University Press, for the Hakluyt Society, (Cambridge), 1967.
- Roe, M., Kenealy and the Tichborne cause: A Study in Mid-Victorian Populism, Melbourne University Press, (Carlton), 1974.
- Roe, M., Nine Australian Progressives: Vitalism in Bourgeois Social Thought, 1890-1960, University of Queensland Press, (St. Lucia), 1984.
- Roe, M., Australia, Britain, and Migration, 1915-1940: A Study of Desperate Hopes, Cambridge University Press, (Cambridge), 1995.
- Roe, M., A Short History of Tasmania, by Lloyd Robson; Updated by Michael Roe, Oxford University Press, (Melbourne), 1997.
- Roe, M., The State of Tasmania: Identity at Federation Time, Tasmanian Historical Research Association, (Hobart), 2001.
- Roe, M., An Imperial Disaster: The Wreck of George the Third, Blubber Head Press, (Sandy Bay), 2006.

== See also ==
- List of Caulfield Grammar School people
