= Short History of the World =

Short History of the World may refer to:

- A Short History of the World, 1997 book by J. M. Roberts, a follow-up to his larger 1994 book History of the World
- A Short History of the World (Blainey book), 2000 book by Geoffrey Blainey
- A Short History of the World (Wells book), 1922 book by H. G. Wells
- The Short Oxford History of the Modern World, book series published by the Oxford University Press

== See also ==
- A Little History of the World, 1935 book by Vienna native Ernst Gombrich
- History of the World (book), 1944 edited by English historian W. N. Weech
