= Janko Prunk =

Slovenian historian of modern history (born 1942)

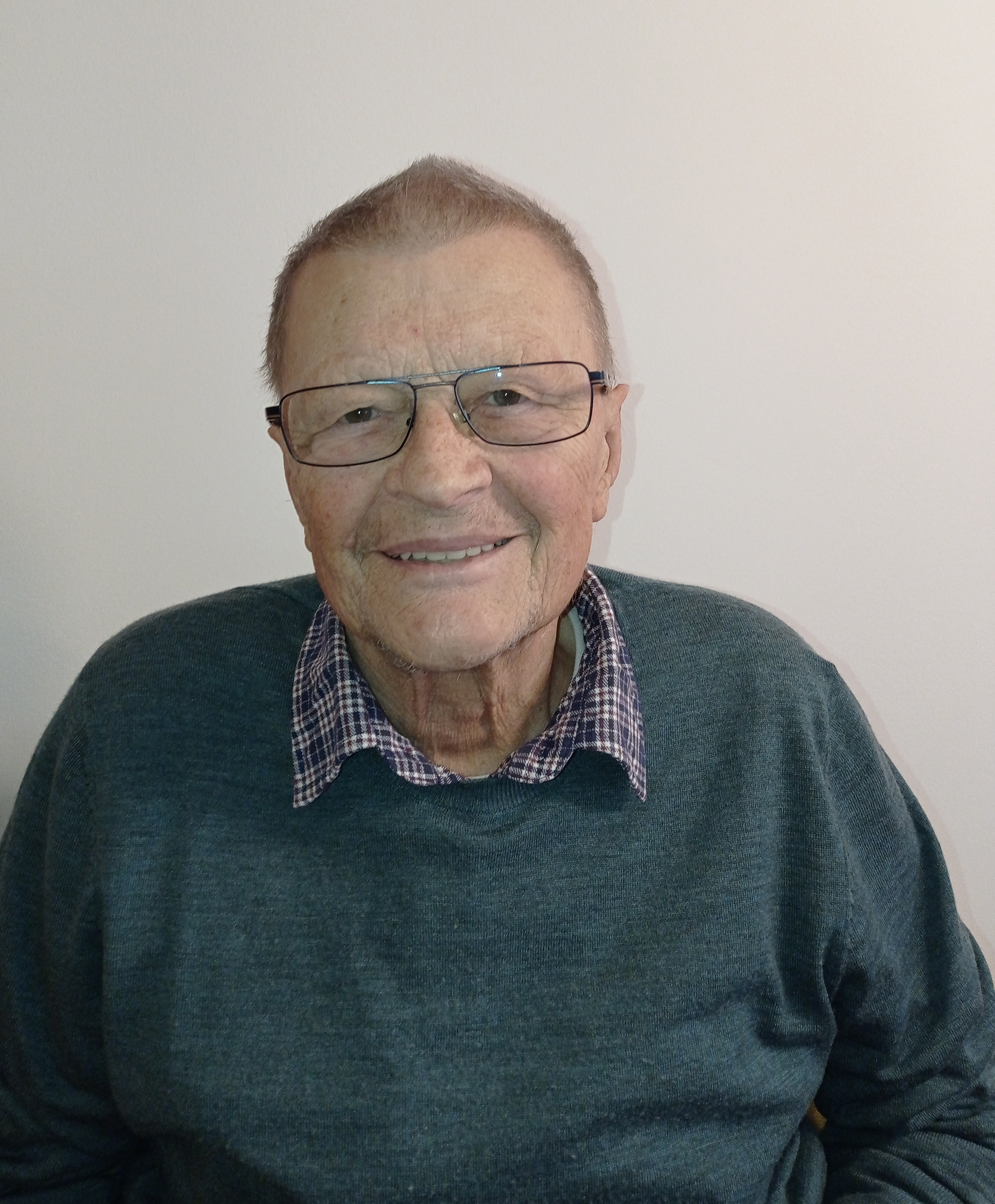
- Prunk in 2026
- Born: 30 December 1942 (age 83); Loka pri Zidanem Mostu, Slovenian Styria, Third Reich
- Citizenship: Slovenian
- Occupations: Historian, Politician
- Years active: 1966–present
- Known for: Modern history, Political philosophy, Christian socialism
- Website: jankoprunk.com

Janko Prunk (born 30 December 1942) is a Slovenian historian of modern history. He has published articles and monographs on analytical politology, modern history, the genesis of modern political formations, and the history of social and political philosophy in Slovenia. He has also written on the history of political movements in Europe from the end of the 18th century until today, especially about Slovene Christian socialism and the history of Slovenian national questions.

== Biography ==
Prunk was born in the small settlement of Loka pri Zidanem Mostu (part of the municipality of Sevnica), in central Slovenia, which was then the German-occupied Slovenian Styria.

Prunk started going to primary school in his birthplace. After fourth grade, he shifted to the school in nearby Radeče. He continued his secondary education at Gymnasium in Celje. Graduating from history and sociology at the University of Ljubljana in 1966. He was recruited into Yugoslav People's Army in Sisak, Socialist Republic of Croatia in the years 1966/67. He obtained his master's degree from University of Ljubljana in 1972. In 1976, he obtained his PhD with a thesis on Slovenian Christian Socialist movement 1918-1941, which was still a controversial topic at that time. Prunk was awarded scholarships by the Alexander von Humboldt Foundation. He worked as a researcher and visiting professor at the University of Freiburg in 1984/1985 and 1994/1995, and in 1988/1989 at the University of Cologne.

From 1966 to 1995, he worked at the Institute for modern history in Ljubljana. Until his retirement in 2013 he worked as professor at the Faculty of Social Sciences of the University of Ljubljana.

Prunk is a member of Leibniz Institute of European History in Mainz, and a senior member of the Center for European Integration Studies in Bonn.

== Politics ==
Prunk has been actively involved in politics. As an early admirer of Jože Pučnik, Prunk joined the Democratic Opposition of Slovenia after the democratization of Slovenia. He was an active member of the Slovenian Democratic Party (known as Slovenian Social Democratic Party between 1989 and 2003). Between 1992 and 1993, Prunk served as Minister for Slovenes outside Slovenia and National Minorities in Slovenia in the first coalition cabinet of Janez Drnovšek.

After 1994, Prunk withdrew from politics for over a decade. Before the parliamentary elections of 2004, he campaigned for the Slovenian Democratic Party. In 2005, he was appointed by the Foreign Minister Dimitrij Rupel, as president of the Slovene-Croatian Historical Commission, formed by the Government of the two countries, to shed light on the history of the relations between them. Between 2004 and 2008, he served as chairman of the Slovenian Democratic Party's internal Committee for Education Policies. He resigned in 2008 because of disagreements over the Government's policy favoring private universities. After the split with the party, he became very critical of the then Prime Minister Janez Janša, whom he accused of being a "liberal with an authoritative touch, who aspires at becoming a Slovenian Piłsudski".

After the parliamentary elections of 2008, Prunk explained his disappointment with the Slovenian Democratic Party as a consequence of its neo-liberal turn. In Prunk's opinion, the party turned its back to the ideals of welfare state held by its founding father Jože Pučnik. Prunk also criticised the charismatic type of leadership of the party's president Janez Janša, stating that the party would most probably collapse if Janša resigned.

== Honors and awards ==
- 1999: Ambassador of the Republic of Slovenia in science award.
- 2016: Sigmund Zois award for superior achievement, for scientific monography Zgodovina Evrope v dobi racionalistične civilizacije 1775-2015 (History of Europe in the era of rationalist civilisation 1775-2015).

== Selected publications ==
Prunk has written over 500 specialized articles and books, since 1966. His book, A brief history of Slovenia: Historical background of the Republic of Slovenia is one of the most comprehensive works on modern Slovenian history.

=== Bibliography ===
- Prunk, Janko (1966). Politično delovanje škofa Jegliča ob priliki cerkvenih vizitacij (diplomska naloga) [Political work of the bishop Jeglič at the chance of the church visits (diploma thesis)] (in Slovenian).
- Prunk, Janko (1973). Slovenski krščanski socialisti v času šestojanuarske diktature 1929-1934 [Slovene Christian socialists in the times of sixth january dictatorship 1929-1934] (in Slovenian).
- Prunk, Janko (1976). Pot krščanskih socialistov v Osvobodilno fronto slovenskega naroda :razvoj 1918-1946 (doktorska disertacija) [Path of the Christian socialists into the liberation front of the Slovene nation : development 1918-1946 (doctoral dissertation)] (in Slovenian). Cankarjeva Založba.
- Prunk, Janko (1978). Zgodovina 2-2 :druga svetovna vojna in svet po njej [History 2 :Second world war and the world afterwards] (in Slovenian). Branko Božič, Tomaž Weber. Državna založba Slovenije.
- Prunk, Janko (1984). Boris Kidrič. Mladinska knjiga.
- Prunk, Janko (1986). Slovenski narodni programi :narodni programi v slovenski politični misli od 1848-1945 [Slovene national programs :national programs in Slovene political thought 1848-1945] (in Slovenian). Društvo 2000.
- Prunk, Janko (1988). Slovenački nacionalni programi : nacionalni programi u slovenačkoj političkoj misli od 1848. do 1945. godine [Slovene national programs :national programs in Slovene political thought 1848-1945] (in Serbian). Eksportpres. ISBN 86-7145-068-6.
- Prunk, Janko (1990). Nova slovenska samozavest [New Slovene self-esteem] (in Slovenian). Panatal.
- Ernst Gombrich (1991). Kratka svetovna zgodovina za mlade bralce [A Little History of the World] (in Slovenian). Translated by Uršula Cetinski, Janko Prunk. Državna Založba Slovenije. ISBN 86-341-0666-7.
- Prunk, Janko (1992). Slovenski narodni vzpon [Slovene national rise] (in Slovenian). Državna založba Slovenije. ISBN 86-341-0846-5.
- Prunk, Janko (1993). 20. stoletje - zgodovina za 8. razred osnovne šole [20th century history schoolbook] (in Slovenian). Branimir Nešović. Državna založba Slovenije. ISBN 86-341-0870-8.
- Ernst Gombrich (1993). Kratka svetovna zgodovina za mlade bralce (2. izd.) [A Little History of the World (2. ed.)] (in Slovenian). Translated by Uršula Cetinski, Janko Prunk. Založba Grad. ISBN 86-341-0666-7.
- Prunk, Janko (1994). Vodnik po slovenskih vinorodnih okoliših [A guide to Slovene wine regions] (in Slovenian). Julij Nemanič, Nada Bunderl Rus. Založba Grad. ISBN 961-90119-1-0.
- Prunk, Janko (1996). A brief history of Slovenia (in Slovenian). Založba Grad. ISBN 961-90119-2-9.
- Prunk, Janko (1996). Slowenien - ein Abriss seiner Geschichte [A brief history of Slovenia] (in German). Založba Grad. ISBN 961-90119-4-5.
- Prunk, Janko (2002). Kratka zgodovina Slovenije [A brief history of Slovenia] (in Slovenian). Založba Grad. ISBN 961-90119-7-X.
- Prunk, Janko (2003). Die rationalistische Zivilisation [The rationalist civilisation] (in German). Center for European Integration Studies. ISBN 3-936183-26-0. ISSN 1435-3288.
- Prunk, Janko (2004). Slovenian historia [A brief history of Slovenia] (in Finnish). Kirja-aurora. ISBN 951-29-2678-4.
- Prunk, Janko (2004). Zgodovina ideoloških spopadov med vojnama [History of ideologic confrontations between the wars] (in Slovenian). Društvo 2000. ISBN 961-91007-9-4.
- Prunk, Janko (2005). Žrtve vojne in revolucije [Fatalities of war and revolution] (in Slovenian). Državni svet Republike Slovenije. ISBN 961-6453-08-4.
- Prunk, Janko (2005). Parlamentarna izkušnja Slovencev [Parliamentary experience of Slovenes] (in Slovenian). Cirila Toplak. Faculty of Social Sciences. ISBN 961-235-223-2.
- Prunk, Janko (2005). Facts about Slovenia. Government of the Republic of Slovenia. ISBN 961-6435-10-8.
- Prunk, Janko (2006). Parlamentarna izkušnja Slovencev 1848 - 2004 (2. rev. izd.) [Parliamentary experience of Slovenes (2nd rev. ed.)] (in Slovenian). Marjetka Rangus, Cirila Toplak. Faculty for social sciences. ISBN 978-961-235-256-1.
- Prunk, Janko (2006). Kratka zgodovina Slovenije (3. rev. izd.) [A brief history of Slovenia (3rd rev. ed.)] (in Slovenian). Založba Grad. ISBN 978-961-90119-9-7.
- Prunk, Janko (2007). Fakten über Slowenien [Facts about Slovenia] (in German). Kommunikationsamt der Regierung der Republik Slowenien. ISBN 978-961-6435-44-4.
- Prunk, Janko (2007). Datos sobre Eslovenia [Facts about Slovenia] (in Spanish). Eslovenia Instituto de Geodesía de Eslovenia. ISBN 978-961-6435-42-0.
- Prunk, Janko (2008). A brief history of Slovenia (3rd rev. ed.). Založba Grad. ISBN 978-961-92448-0-7.
- Prunk, Janko (2008). Racionalistična civilizacija : 1776-2000 [Rationalist civilisation : 1776-2000] (in Slovenian). Mladinska knjiga. ISBN 978-961-01-0629-6.
- Prunk, Janko (2009). Faits sur la Slovénie [Facts about Slovenia] (in French). Bureau gouvernemental pour la communication. ISBN 978-961-6435-58-1.
- Prunk, Janko (2009). Fakten über Slowenien (2nd rev. ed.) [Facts about Slovenia (2nd rev. ed.)] (in German). Kommunikationsamt der Regierung der Republik Slowenien. ISBN 978-961-6435-50-5.
- Prunk, Janko (2011). Facts about Slovenia. Government Communication Office. ISBN 978-961-6435-55-0.
- Prunk, Janko (2014). Sto let življenja slovenskih političnih strank : 1890-1990 [One hundred years of life of Slovene political parties : 1890-1990] (in Slovenian). Marjetka Rangus. Faculty of Social Sciences, Založba FDV. ISBN 978-961-235-683-5.
- Prunk, Janko (2015). Zgodovina Evrope v dobi racionalistične civilizacije 1775-2015 [History of Europe in the era of rationalist civilisation 1775-2015] (in Slovenian). Cankarjeva založba. ISBN 978-961-282-131-9.

== See also ==
- History of Slovenia

Political offices
Preceded by Janez Dular	Minister for Slovenes outside Slovenia and for National Minorities in Slovenia; 14 May 1992–25 January 1993	Succeeded by Office abolished
