= History of the World (book) =

1944 book by William Nassau Weech

- Editor: William Nassau Weech
- Publisher: Odhams
- Publication date: 1944

History of the World is a compendium written by a collection of noted historians. It was edited by William Nassau Weech, M.A., a former Headmaster of Sedbergh School (and a very early aficionado of downhill skiing who also wrote By Ski in Norway, one of the first British accounts of the sport). First published by Odhams in 1944, History of the World ran to three editions, the second edition in 1959, and the third in 1965. The editor, W.N. Weech, wrote in the Preface:

"This book is designed for the ordinary man or woman, who should have no difficulty in getting through it in a month, though many may prefer to compress their first reading of it into a fortnight."

W.N. Weech's History of the World is notable for bearing comparison with Ernst Gombrich's best-selling Little History of the World, a book that is shorter and is addressed to younger readers. (Gombrich, a Jewish émigré from Vienna, was an art historian better known for his classic work, The Story of Art.) Weech's book is noteworthy, not only for being both thorough and accessible, but also (not unlike Gombrich's) for maintaining a tolerant and measured style, despite being written during the dark days of Nazism.

A contributor at the 2011 Hay Festival cited Weech's book as a remarkable discovery.

Each chapter has a separate author, as follows: There are many authors that have their own ideas

== Chapter titles (of the first edition) ==
1. Civilizations of the Near East - E.H. Weech (aka "Bubbles"), the editor's daughter
2. The Glory of Greece - Roger Roberts (Headmaster of Blundell's School)
3. The Roman World - Basil Garnon Williams (Classics Master, Marlborough College)
4. The Story of Persia - W.N. Weech & G.P. Churchill (Teheran Legation & Algiers Consulate)
5. Mongols, Tartars and Turks - Sir E. Denison Ross (Former Director of School of Oriental Studies, or SOS (Now SOAS))
6. The Peoples and Religions of India - W.N. Weech & G.A. Rylands, MA
7. China and Japan - C.M. Winn (Lecturer in Colloquial Chineses, SOS)
8. Islam and Christendom - G.B. Smith (a former Headmaster of Sedbergh School)
9. The End of the Middle Ages - Major W.L. McElwee (History Master at Stowe School)
10. The Beginning of Modern Times - Captain W. Simms (History Master at Sherborne School)
11. Reason And Revolution - L.J. Cheyney MA
12. Fifty Years of Progress - Captain Mowatt (History Master at Clayesmore School)
13. Nationalism and Internationalism - M.C. MacLaughlin (History Tutor at Stowe School)
14. The Latest Age - Lt-Colonel David Ayerst (Headmaster of King Edward VII School, Lytham)
15. Epilogue - W.N. Weech

Curiously, the 1944 first edition does not state its publication date. The latest event it records is the Japanese expansion into the Pacific zone after their bombing of Pearl Harbor in December, 1941. The book is printed on poor-quality wartime paper, which is all that was available at that stage of the Second World War. In the Preface, W.N. Weech adds, "I owe a debt of gratitude to my publishers for producing this History of the World in spite of all the present difficulties ...", "present difficulties" presumably being an understatement for the War.

The dust jacket of the first edition has two illustrations on the front and back, with numerous notable names from history. On the front cover are Wellington, Nelson, Lincoln, Napoleon, King William, Henry VIII, Custer, Bismarck, Charlemagne, and unidentified fighters of the RAF, the British Army and Royal Navy and the Afrika Korps. On the back we find Jesus Christ, an Arab (who may be Mohammed), Julius Caesar, Tutankhamen and others, including a Viking, a Mongol, an Assyrian and a Greek.
