= The Story of Art Without Men =

2022 book by Katy Hessel

- Cover of the 2023 US hardback edition
- Author: Katy Hessel
- Language: English
- Genre: Non-fiction
- Publisher: Hutchinson Heinemann
- Publication date: 2022
- Pages: 522
- Awards: Waterstones Book of the Year, 2022
- ISBN: 978-1529151145

The Story of Art Without Men is a book by the British curator and art historian, Katy Hessel, which was the Waterstones Book of the Year in 2022. It was titled as a response to the classic book by E. H. Gombrich, The Story of Art, which featured no women in its first edition in 1950, and was also inspired by Linda Nochlin's 1971 article, Why have there been no great women artists?

== Background ==
Women have never lacked artistic talent, despite comments by such notables as the 19th-century English polymath, John Ruskin, that "No woman could paint". However, the recognition of women's talents was hindered by discrimination that meant that, although they may have exhibited artistic skills, they were unable to study at art schools and were barred from attending life classes. And, in the early days of the period covered by the book, few women even had the opportunity to draw or pick up a paintbrush. The lucky ones were often those who had artist fathers. The limited number of women that overcame all of these hurdles then faced the challenge of being accepted by those who commissioned or bought works of art. In the Victorian era, a common practice was to scratch out a woman's name on a painting and replace it with a male one to increase the chances of it being sold. This reduced the visibility of female artists and now complicates studies of the role played by women artists at that time.

As Hessel points out, Lives of the Most Excellent Painters, Sculptors, and Architects, first published in 1550 by Giorgio Vasari with reference to the Italian Renaissance, mentioned only four women. By 1950, Gombrich could publish a supposedly definitive book on the history of art without referring to a single woman artist. In London, the Royal Academy of Arts has never hosted a solo exhibition by a woman in its main exhibition hall, although two of the 40 founding members of the Royal Academy in 1768 were women, Mary Moser and Angelica Kaufmann. The National Gallery, founded in 1824, did not hold a major solo exhibition by a female artist until 2020, when the work of Artemisia Gentileschi was shown. Only one percent of the National Gallery's collection is by female artists. In the US, a 2019 study found that in the collections of 18 major US art museums, 87 percent of the works were by men. Hessel gives examples of where male artists have often been credited with women artists' conceptual and aesthetic breakthroughs.

== The book ==
The Story of Art Without Men in the original hard copy had 522 pages. It was published in 2022 by Hutchinson Heinemann in the UK and in 2023 by W. W. Norton & Company in the US. It is available in paperback and has been translated into French, German, Italian, Portuguese, and Spanish. It is heavily illustrated and discusses numerous artists from Gentileschi, Kauffman, Anni Albers, Frida Kahlo, Tamara de Lempicka, Judy Chicago, Julie Mehretu, and Tracey Emin to many more who are much less recognised, covering artists from those alive in 1500 to those born in the 1990s. The book does not just concentrate on painting and drawing as, denied the opportunity to study at art schools or to draw the human body in classes, women often turned to other activities such as weaving, art naïf, folk art, quilts, and ceramics. Photography and more recent artistic movements such as collage, conceptual art, installation art and performance art are also covered.

== Critical reception ==
Giving the book a positive reception, the Times Literary Supplement noted that it was more a history of artists than of art. On the other hand, reviewers in Australia and Scotland complained about the lack of coverage of artists in their countries. Kirkus Reviews considered that it was not just a rebuttal to the discrimination faced by women but "deftly researched, the text reveals an alternate history of centuries of artistic movements". It described the book as "an overdue upending of art historical discourse".

The Guardian described the book as "beautifully written" and full of "fascinating details", skilfully tagging numerous lesser-known names on to more famous ones. It noted, however, that the book was "not fully decoupled from traditional western gallery systems" as the featured non-white and international artists had all been shown or reviewed in leading London, Paris or New York outlets. The paper believed that it would take many more similar feats of scholarship before women were fully written into art history, but Hessel had gone further than anyone else in attempting to make a global survey.This was a point also stressed by Tracey Emin, who noted on the book's cover that "it's a long way before the balance is truly redressed but this is a good start."
