= Katy Hessel =

British art historian, broadcaster, writer and curator

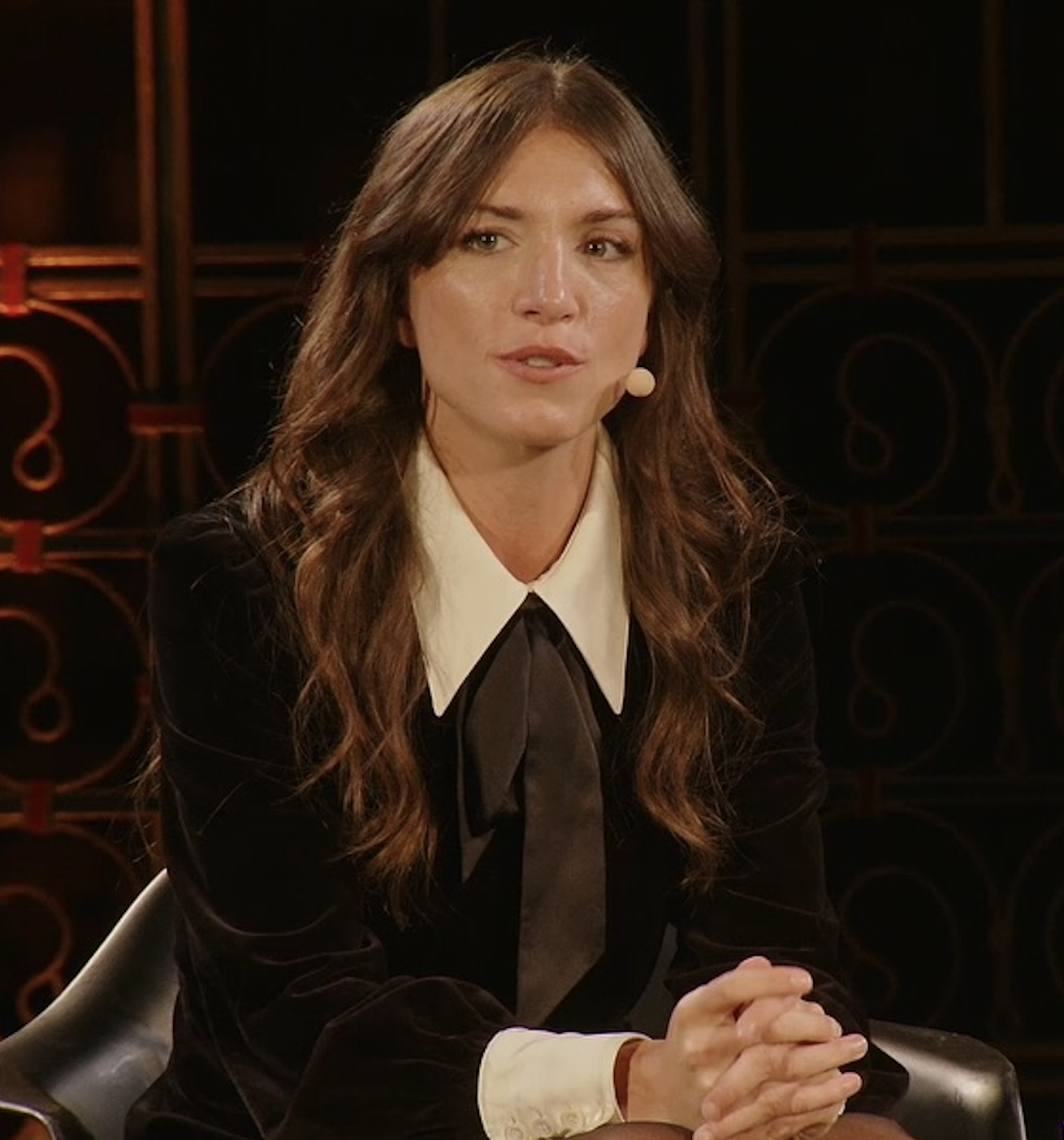
- Hessel in 2024
- Born: 1994 (age 31–32); London
- Education: University College London
- Occupations: Writer, art historian, broadcaster
- Writing career
- Notable work: The Story of Art Without Men (2022)

Katy Hessel is an English art historian, broadcaster, writer and curator. Her work is concerned with women artists.

== Early life ==
Hessel was born and raised in London. She attended St Michael's Grammar School and Westminster School. She studied art history at University College London.

== Career ==
=== Writing ===
Hessel writes on the subject of women artists for various publications.

She has written and presented the BBC arts documentaries Artemisia Gentileschi (2020) and Art on the BBC: Monet (2022).

In September 2022, Hessel published the book The Story of Art Without Men, a 500-year survey of art created by women from the 1500s to 2020s. Hessel decided to write this book after visiting an art fair in 2015, where none of the artworks on display were by women, which also made her reflect on her own lack of knowledge of female artists. The title is a direct reference to the comprehensive art history book The Story of Art by E. H. Gombrich, which faced criticism for the omission of female artists. It won the 2022 Waterstones Book of the Year.

Her work has been criticised for the lack of acknowledgement of feminist art-historical research.

In 2025, she published her second book How to Live an Artful Life, a book containing quotations and insights from artists for all 366 days of the year. Lou Selfridge, in Frieze, described the book as "‘Insta inspo’ par excellence."

In March 2026, she will publish her third book, The Story of Art without Men: An illustrated guide to amazing women artists, an adaptation of the bestselling The Story of Art without Men, for younger readers.

=== Other ===
She has hosted Dior Talks: Feminist Art.

Hessel runs the Great Women Artists Instagram account and in 2019 created a podcast by the same name in which she interviews art historians, art curators, writers, and art lovers about women artists and also talks to women artists about their work and career.

In 2022, Hessel became a curatorial trustee of Charleston.

== Awards ==
- 2021: Forbes 30 Under 30 in Art & Culture
- 2022: Winner of Waterstones Book of the Year for The Story of Art Without Men

== Publications ==
- (2022) The Story of Art Without Men. London. Penguin Group. ISBN 978-1-5291-5114-5
- (2025) How to Live an Artful Life. London. Hutchinson Heinemann. ISBN 978-1-5291-5520-4
- (2026) The Story of Art without Men: An illustrated guide to amazing women artists. London. Puffin. ISBN 978-0-241-73819-1
