= White Australia policy =

Historical racial policies in Australia

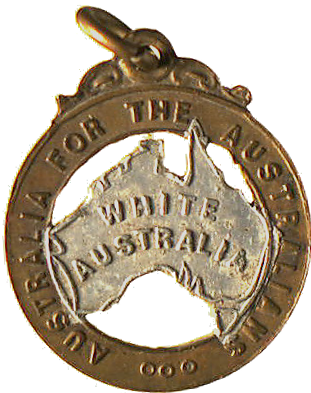
The Australian Natives' Association, comprising Australian-born Whites, produced this badge in 1911. Prime Minister Edmund Barton was a member of the association. The badge shows the use of the slogan "White Australia" at that time.

The White Australia policy was a set of racial policies that aimed to forbid people of non-European ethnic origins – Asians (primarily Chinese) and Pacific Islanders – from immigrating to Australia, in order to create a "White/British" ideal focused on Anglo-Celtic peoples, but not exclusively. Pre-Federation, the Australian colonies passed many anti-Chinese immigration laws mainly using Poll Taxes. With Federation in 1901 came discrimination based on the Dictation Test, which effectively gave power to immigration officials to racially discriminate without mentioning race. The policy also affected immigrants from Germany, Italy, and other European countries, especially in wartime. Governments progressively dismantled such policies between 1949 and 1973, when the Whitlam government removed the last racial elements of Australia's immigration laws.

Competition in the gold fields between European and Chinese miners, and labour union opposition to the importation of Pacific Islanders (primarily South Sea Islanders) into the sugar plantations of Queensland, reinforced demands to eliminate or minimize low-wage immigration from Asia and the Pacific Islands. From the 1850s colonial governments imposed restrictions on Chinese arrivals, including poll taxes and tonnage restrictions. The colonial authorities levied a special tax on Chinese immigrants which other immigrants did not have to pay. Towards the end of the 19th century, labour unions pushed to stop Chinese immigrants from working in the furniture and market garden industries. Some laws were passed regarding the labelling of Chinese-made furniture in Victoria and Western Australia, but not in New South Wales. Chinese people dominated market gardening until their numbers declined as departures were not replaced.

Soon after Australia became a federation in January 1901, the federal government of Edmund Barton passed the Immigration Restriction Act 1901; this was drafted by Alfred Deakin, who eventually became Australia's second prime minister. The passage of this bill marked the commencement of the White Australia Policy as Australian federal government policy. The key feature of this legislation was the dictation test, which was used to bar non-White immigrants from entry. Subsequent acts further strengthened the policy. These policies effectively gave British migrants preference over all others through the first half of the 20th century. During World War II, Prime Minister John Curtin reinforced the policy, saying "This country shall remain forever the home of the descendants of those people who came here in peace in order to establish in the South Seas an outpost of the British race."

Successive governments dismantled the policy in stages after the conclusion of World War II, with the Chifley and Menzies governments encouraging non-British Europeans to immigrate to Australia. The Migration Act 1958 abolished the dictation test, while the Holt government removed discrimination against non-White applicants for citizenship in 1966. The Whitlam government passed laws to ensure that race would be totally disregarded as a component for immigration to Australia in 1973. The Whitlam government passed the Racial Discrimination Act 1975, which made racially-based selection criteria unlawful. In the decades since, Australia has maintained large-scale multi-ethnic immigration. As of 2018, Australia's migration program allows people from any country to apply to immigrate to Australia, regardless of their nationality, ethnicity, culture, religion, or language, provided that they meet the criteria set out in law. Prior to 2011, the United Kingdom was the largest source country for immigration to Australia but, since then, China and India have provided the highest number of permanent migrants. These results exclude the many settlers from New Zealand unless they choose to apply through the permanent resident program. The National Museum of Australia describes the White Australia Policy as openly racist, stating that it "existed because many White Australians feared that non-White immigrants would threaten Australian society".

== Immigration policies before Federation ==
=== Eastern gold rush era ===
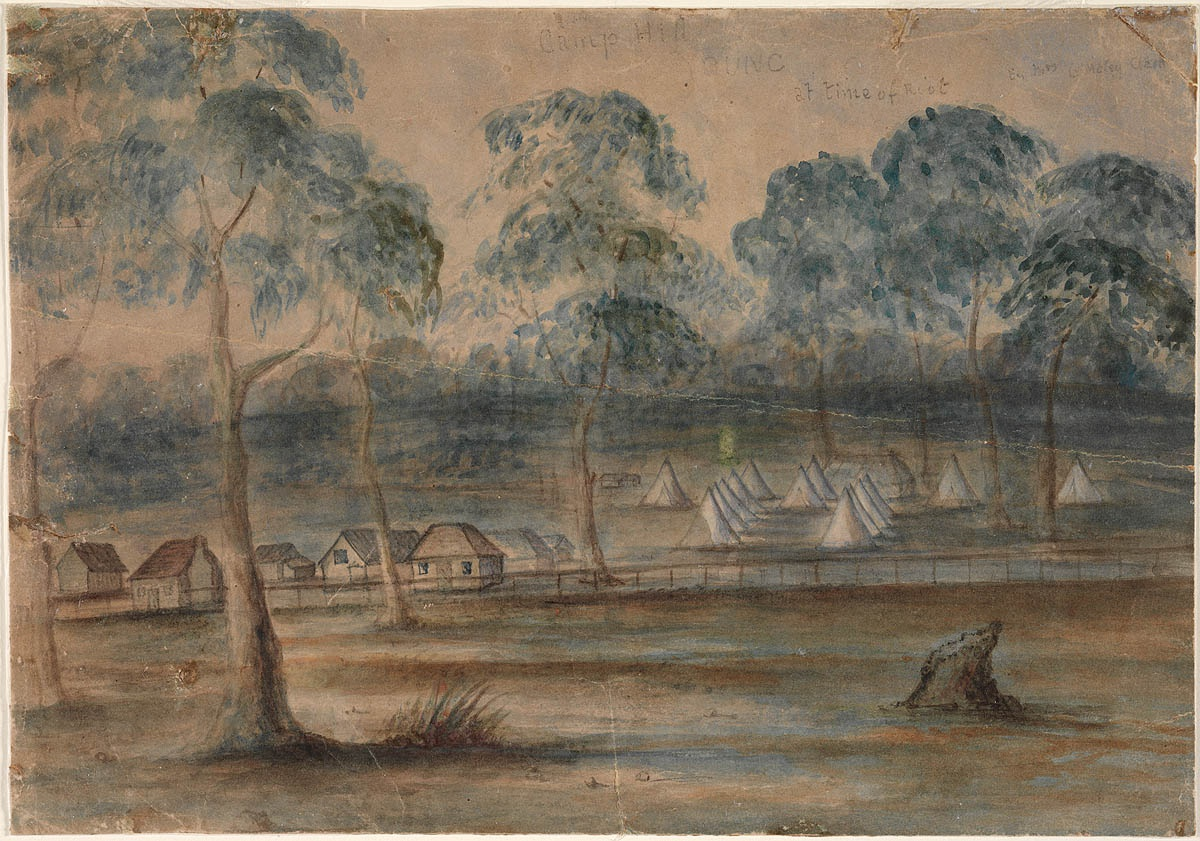
Camp Hill (Lambing Flat) at time of the riots, 1860–61. Now the town of Young, New South Wales

The discovery of gold in Australia in 1851 led to an influx of immigrants from all around the world. The colony of Victoria had a population of only 77,000 in 1851 and New South Wales just 200,000, but the huge influx of settlers spurred by the Australian gold rushes transformed the Australian colonies economically, politically and demographically. Over the next 20 years, 40,000 Chinese men but very few women, nearly all from the province of Guangdong (then known as Canton) but divided by language and dialect nevertheless, immigrated to the goldfields seeking prosperity.

Gold brought great wealth but also new social tensions. Multi-ethnic migrants came to Victoria and New South Wales in large numbers for the first time. Competition on the goldfields, particularly resentment among White miners towards the successes of Chinese miners, led to tensions between groups and eventually a series of significant racist protests and riots, including the Buckland riot in 1857 and the Lambing Flat riots between 1860 and 1861. Governor Hotham, on 16 November 1854, appointed a Royal Commission on Victorian goldfields problems and grievances. This led to restrictions being placed on Chinese immigration and residency taxes levied from Chinese residents in Victoria from 1855. New South Wales following suit with poll taxes and tonnage restrictions only in 1861. These restrictions remained in force only until 1867.

=== Support from the Australian labour movement ===
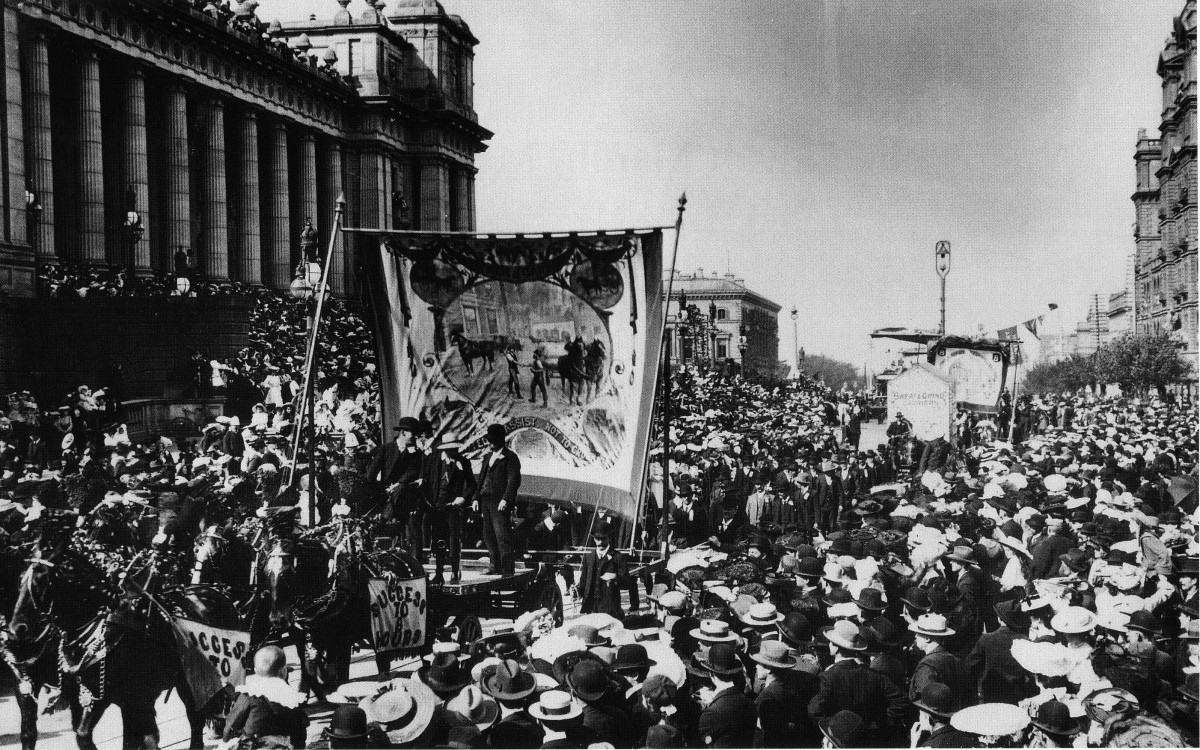
Eight-hour day march c. 1900, outside Parliament House in Spring Street, Melbourne

Melbourne Trades Hall was opened in 1859 with trades and labour councils and trades halls opening in all cities and most regional towns in the following forty years. During the 1880s, trade unions developed among shearers, miners, and stevedores (wharf workers), but soon spread to cover almost all blue-collar jobs. Shortages of labour led to high wages for a prosperous skilled working class, whose unions demanded and got an eight-hour day and other benefits unheard of in Europe.

Australia gained a reputation as "the working man's paradise". Some employers hired Chinese labourers, who were cheaper and more hard working. This produced a reaction which led eventually to all the colonies restricting Chinese immigration by 1888 and subsequently other Asian immigration. This was the genesis of the White Australia Policy. The "Australian compact", based around centralised industrial arbitration, a degree of government assistance particularly for primary industries, and White Australia, was to continue for many years before gradually dissolving in the second half of the 20th century.

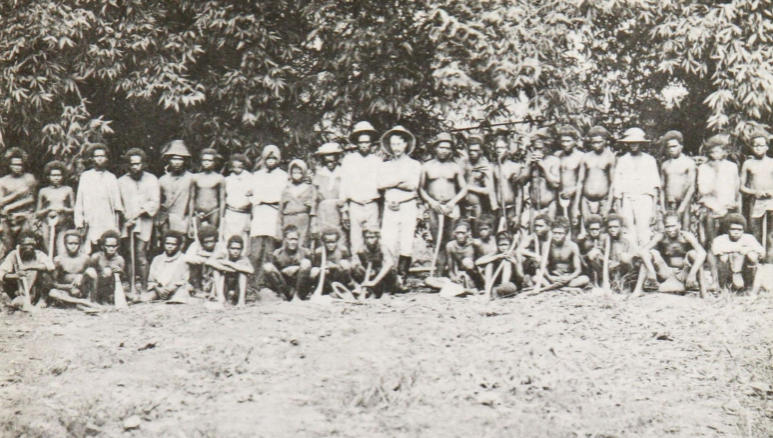
Kanaka workers in a sugarcane plantation, c. 1870

The growth of the sugar industry in Queensland in the 1870s led to searching for labourers prepared to work in a tropical environment. During this time, thousands of "Kanakas" (Pacific Islanders) were brought into Australia as indentured workers. This and related practices of bringing in non-White labour to be cheaply employed was commonly termed "blackbirding" and refers to the recruitment of people, often through trickery and kidnappings, to work on plantations, particularly the sugar cane plantations of Queensland (Australia) and Fiji. In the 1870s and 1880s, the trade union movement began a series of protests against foreign labour. Their arguments were that Asians and Chinese took jobs away from White men, worked for "substandard" wages, lowered working conditions, were harder workers and refused unionisation.

Objections to these arguments came largely from wealthy land owners in rural areas. It was argued that without Asiatics to work in the tropical areas of the Northern Territory and Queensland, the area would have to be abandoned. Despite these objections to restricting immigration, between 1875 and 1888 all Australian colonies enacted legislation which excluded all further Chinese immigration. Asian immigrants already residing in the Australian colonies were not expelled and retained the same rights as their Anglo and southern compatriots, although they faced significant discrimination.

Agreements were made to further increase these restrictions in 1895 following an inter-colonial premiers' conference where all colonies agreed to extend entry restrictions to all non-white races. However, in attempting to enact this legislation, the governors of New South Wales, South Australia and Tasmania reserved the bills, due to a treaty with Japan, and they did not become law. Instead, the Natal Act 1897 was introduced, restricting "undesirable persons" who could not fill in a set form rather than by naming any specific race.

The British government in London was not pleased with legislation that discriminated against certain subjects of its empire, but decided not to disallow the laws that were passed. Colonial Secretary Joseph Chamberlain explained in 1897:

We quite sympathize with the determination...of these colonies...that there should not be an influx of people alien in civilisation, alien in religion, alien in customs, whose influx, moreover, would seriously interfere with the legitimate rights of the existing labouring population.

== From the Federation to World War II ==
In writing about the preoccupations of the Australian population in early Federation Australia before World War I in ANZAC to Amiens, the official historian of the war, Charles Bean, considered the White Australia Policy and defined it as follows:

"White Australia Policy" – a vehement effort to maintain a high Western standard of economy, society and culture (necessitating at that stage, however it might be camouflaged, the rigid exclusion of Oriental peoples).

=== Federation Convention and Australia's first government ===
Immigration was a prominent topic of discussion in the lead up to the establishment of the Australian Federation. At the third session of the Australasian Federation Convention of 1898, Western Australian premier and future federal cabinet member John Forrest summarised the feeling of the Anglo-Saxon people in Australia:

It is of no use to shut our eyes to the fact that there is a great feeling all over Australia against the introduction of coloured persons. It goes without saying that we do not like to talk about it, but it is so.

The Barton government which came to power following the first elections of the Commonwealth parliament in 1901 was formed by the Protectionist Party with the support of the Australian Labor Party. The support of the Labor Party was contingent upon restricting non-white immigration, reflecting the attitudes of the Australian Workers Union and other labour organisations at the time, upon whose support the Labor Party was founded. The Australian historian James Jupp wrote that it was not true that the White Australia policy was exclusively right-wing as the strongest support for the White Australia policy was on the left-side of Australian politics, with both the trade unions and the Labour Party being the most militant opponents of Asian immigration well into the 1960s. Many Australians in the early 20th century tended to define being white as being the same as Australian with a majority of Australian states passing laws banning marriage and/or sex between whites and Aboriginals as part of an effort to maintain Australia's white character.

The first Parliament of Australia quickly moved to restrict immigration to maintain Australia's "British character", and the Pacific Island Labourers Bill and the Immigration Restriction Bill were passed shortly before parliament rose for its first Christmas recess. The colonial secretary in Britain had, however, made it clear that a race-based immigration policy would run "contrary to the general conceptions of equality which have ever been the guiding principle of British rule throughout the Empire". The Barton government therefore conceived of the "Education test", later called the "Dictation Test", which would allow the government, at the discretion of Customs Officers, to block unwanted migrants by forcing them to sit a test in "any European language". At the time, Anglo-Japanese relations were improving, and in 1902 Britain and Japan were to sign a defensive alliance directed implicitly against Russia. The White Australia policy led to vigorous protests from the Japanese government, and led to complaints from London that Australia was gratuitously straining relations with Japan, which Britain viewed as a prospective ally against Russia.

For the Labor Party this was a compromise of principles, so the main question for the debate on the Immigration Restriction Act just how openly racist to be, with the Labor Party preferring to openly bar "aboriginal natives of Asia, Africa, or the islands thereof". However, in the end the preferred option of the British, the Education Test was passed. There was also opposition from Queensland and its sugar industry to the proposals of the Pacific Islanders Bill to exclude "Kanaka" labourers, however Barton argued that the practice was "veiled slavery" that could lead to a "negro problem" similar to that in the United States, and the bill was passed.

==== Immigration Restriction Act 1901 ====
The new Federal Parliament, as one of its first pieces of legislation, passed the Immigration Restriction Act 1901 (1 Edward VII 17 1901) to "place certain restrictions on immigration and... for the removal... of prohibited immigrants". The act drew on similar legislation in the South African colony of Natal. Edmund Barton, the prime minister, argued in support of the bill with the following statement: "The doctrine of the equality of man was never intended to apply to the equality of the Englishman and the Chinaman."

The attorney general tasked with drafting the legislation was Alfred Deakin. Deakin supported Barton's position over that of the Labor Party in drafting the bill (the ALP wanted more direct methods of exclusion than the dictation test) and redacted the more vicious racism proposed for the text in his second reading of the Bill. In seeking to justify the policy, Deakin said he believed that the Japanese and Chinese might be a threat to the newly formed federation and it was this belief that led to legislation to ensure they would be kept out:

It is not the bad qualities, but the good qualities of these alien races that make them so dangerous to us. It is their inexhaustible energy, their power of applying themselves to new tasks, their endurance and low standard of living that make them such competitors.

Early drafts of the act explicitly banned non-Europeans from migrating to Australia but objections from the British government, which feared that such a measure would offend British subjects in India and Britain's allies in Japan, caused the Barton government to remove this wording. Instead, a "dictation test" was introduced as a device for excluding unwanted immigrants. Immigration officials were given the power to exclude any person who failed to pass a 50-word dictation test. At first this was to be in any European language, but was later changed to include any language. The tests were given in such a way as to make them impossible to pass. If a person seemed likely to pass in English then a test in another language could be given. Attlee Hunt, the first administrator of the Immigration Restriction Act expressed it clearly in a 1903 memo to all Customs Officers: "It is not desirable that persons should be allowed to past the test, and before putting it to anyone the Officer should be satisfied that he will fail. If he is considered likely to pass the test if put in English, it should be applied in some other language of which he is ignorant."

Migrants who had been domiciled in any of the Australian colonies, or the federation, before the introduction of the act, and wanted to leave the country for a temporary period, could apply for a Certificate of Exemption to the Dictation Test (CEDT).

The legislation found strong support in the new Australian Parliament, with arguments ranging from economic protection to outright racism. The Labor Party wanted to protect "white" jobs and pushed for more explicit restrictions. A few politicians spoke of the need to avoid hysterical treatment of the question. Member of Parliament Bruce Smith said he had "no desire to see low-class Indians, Chinamen or Japanese...swarming into this country... But there is obligation...not (to) unnecessarily offend the educated classes of those nations" Norman Cameron, a Free Trade Party member from Tasmania, expressed a rare note of dissension:

[N]o race on... this earth has been treated in a more shameful manner than have the Chinese.... They were forced at the point of a bayonet to admit Englishmen... into China. Now if we compel them to admit our people... why in the name of justice should we refuse to admit them here?

Outside parliament, Australia's first Catholic cardinal, Patrick Francis Moran was politically active and denounced anti-Chinese legislation as "un-Christian". The popular press mocked the Cardinal's position and the small European population of Australia generally supported the legislation and remained fearful of being overwhelmed by an influx of non-British migrants from the vastly different cultures of the highly populated nations to Australia's north.

The Immigration Restriction Act 1901 imposed a dictation test, in any European language, for any non-European migrant to Australia. The immigration officer (Customs until 1949) could choose any language, which effectively meant that the officer had the power to restrict the immigration of any individual. Further discriminatory legislation was the Postal and Telegraph Services Act 1901 (1 Edward VII 12 1901), which required any ship carrying mail to and from Australia to only have a white crew.

==== Pacific Island Labourers Act 1901 ====
In 1901, there were approximately 9,800 Pacific Islander labourers in Queensland. In 1901, the Australian parliament passed the Pacific Island Labourers Act 1901 (1 Edward VII 16 1901). The result of these statutes was that 7,500 Pacific Islanders (called "Kanakas") working mostly on plantations in Queensland were deported, and entry into Australia by Pacific Islanders was prohibited after 1904. Those exempted from repatriation, along with a number of others who escaped deportation, remained in Australia to form the basis of what is today Australia's largest non-indigenous black ethnic group. Today, the descendants of those who remained are officially referred to as South Sea Islanders.

==== Exemption for Māori ====
Māori, as British citizens, were able to settle in Australia and generally benefited from the same immigration and voting rights as other New Zealanders, making them a notable exception to the White Australia Policy. Based on the Commonwealth Franchise Act 1902, Māori residents in Australia were granted the right to vote. However, the Australian government granted equal rights to Māori only reluctantly. In 1905, the New Zealand government made a formal complaint about the exclusion of two Māori shearers, after which the Australian government changed its customs regulations to allow Māori to freely enter the country. Other Pacific Islanders were still subject to the White Australia Policy.

=== Paris Peace Conference ===
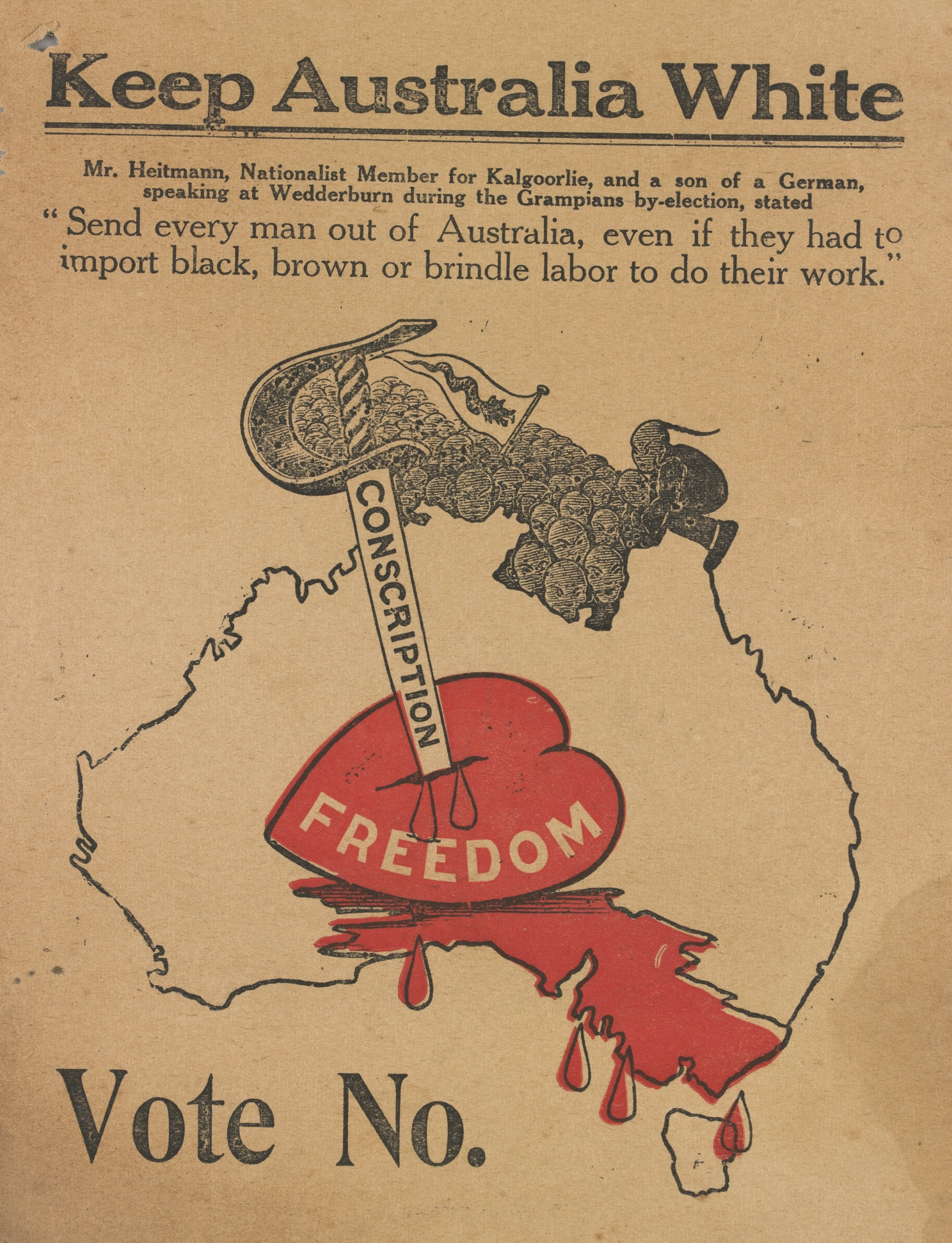
"Keep Australia White" poster used during the 1917 conscription referendum. The "No" campaign claimed that conscripted soldiers sent overseas would be replaced by non-white labour.

At the 1919 Paris Peace Conference following the First World War, Japan sought to include a racial equality clause in the Covenant of the League of Nations. Japanese policy reflected their desire to remove or to ease the immigration restrictions against Japanese (especially in the United States and Canada), which Japan regarded as a humiliation and affront to its prestige.

Australian Prime Minister Billy Hughes was already concerned by the prospect of Japanese expansion in the Pacific. Australia, Japan and New Zealand had seized the Germany's Pacific territories in the early stages of the war and Hughes was concerned to retain German New Guinea as vital to the defence of Australia. The treaty ultimately granted Australia a League of Nations Mandate over German New Guinea and Japan to the South Seas Mandate immediately to its north – thus bringing Australian and Japanese territory to a shared border – a situation altered only by Japan's Second World War invasion of New Guinea.

Hughes vehemently opposed Japan's racial equality proposition. Hughes recognised that such a clause would be a threat to White Australia and made it clear to British prime minister David Lloyd George that he would leave the conference if the clause was adopted. Hughes wrote in 1919: "No Govt. could live for a day in Australia if it tempered with a White Australia". Hughes wrote a note to Colonel Edward M. House of the American delegation: "It may be all right. But sooner than agree to it I would walk into the Seine-or the Folies Bergeres-with my clothes off". Hughes did offer the compromise that he would support the Racial Equality Clause provided that it did not affect immigration, an offer the Japanese rejected. When the proposal failed, Hughes reported in the Australian parliament:

The White Australia is yours. You may do with it what you please, but at any rate, the soldiers have achieved the victory and my colleagues and I have brought that great principle back to you from the conference, as safe as it was on the day when it was first adopted.

== Abolition of the policy ==
=== World War II ===
Australian anxiety at the prospect of Japanese expansionism and war in the Pacific continued through the 1930s. Hughes, by then a minister in the United Australia Party's Lyons government, made a notable contribution to Australia's attitude towards immigration in a 1935 speech in which he argued that "Australia must populate or perish."

Between the Great Depression starting in 1929 and the end of World War II in 1945, global conditions kept immigration to very low levels. At the start of the war, Prime Minister John Curtin (ALP) reinforced the message of the White Australia Policy by saying: "This country shall remain forever the home of the descendants of those people who came here in peace in order to establish in the South Seas an outpost of the British race."

Following the 1942 Fall of Singapore, Australians feared invasion by Imperial Japan. Australian cities were bombed by the Japanese airforce and Navy and Axis naval forces menaced Australian shipping, while the Royal Navy remained pre-occupied with the battles of the Atlantic and Mediterranean in the face of Nazi aggression in Europe. A Japanese invasion fleet headed for the Australian Territory of New Guinea was only halted by the intervention of the United States Navy in the Battle of the Coral Sea. Australia received thousands of refugees from territories falling to advancing Japanese forces – notably thousands of Chinese men and women as well as many Chinese seamen. There were also Dutch who fled the Dutch East Indies (now Indonesia). Aboriginal Australians, Torres Strait Islanders, Papua New Guineans and Timorese served in the frontline of the defence of Australia, bringing Australia's racially discriminatory immigration and political rights policies into focus and wartime service gave many Indigenous Australians confidence in demanding their rights upon return to civilian life.

During the war, talk arose about the possibility of abolishing the policy. Hostility to this idea was one reason Australia never signed a treaty with China as it was feared the Chinese government would request the abolition of the White Australian policy as an ally. A spokesman for the Labor Party demanded that it be continued, stating:

The policy of White Australia is now, perhaps, the most outstanding political characteristic of this country, and it has been accepted not only by those closely associated with it, but also by those who watched and studied "this interesting experiment" from afar. Only those who favor the exploitation of a servile coloured race for greed of gain, and a few professional economists and benighted theologians, are now heard in serious criticism of a White Australia; but ... they are encouraged by the ill-timed and inappropriate pronouncements of what are, after all, irresponsible officials.

=== Post-war immigration ===
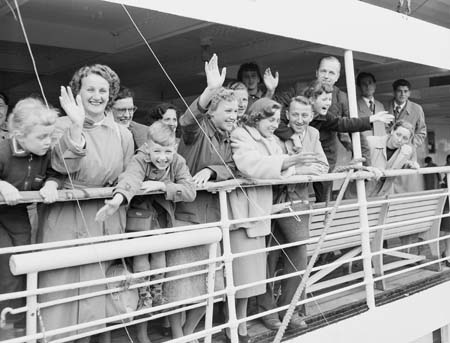
Dutch migrants arriving in Australia in 1954. Australia embarked upon a massive immigration programme following the Second World War and gradually dismantled the preferential treatment afforded to British migrants.

Following the trauma of the Second World War, Australia's vulnerability during the Pacific War and its relatively small population compared to other nations led to policies summarised by the slogan, "populate or perish." According to author Lachlan Strahan, this was an ethnocentric slogan that in effect was an admonition to fill Australia with Europeans or else risk having it overrun by Asians. Immigration Minister Arthur Calwell stated in 1947 to critics of the government's mass immigration programme: "We have 25 years at most to populate this country before the yellow races are down on us."

During the war, many non-white refugees, Chinese, Malays, Indonesians and Filipinos, arrived in Australia, but Calwell controversially sought to have them all deported. Between 1945 and 1952, an Australian brigade served as part of the British Commonwealth Occupation Force in Japan. Until 1952, Australia did not permit Japanese women who had married Australian soldiers to enter Australia.

The Chifley government introduced the Aliens Deportation Act 1948, which had its weaknesses exposed by the High Court case O'Keefe v Calwell, and then passed the War-time Refugees Removal Act 1949 which gave the immigration minister sweeping powers of deportation. In 1948, Iranian Bahá'ís seeking to immigrate to Australia were classified as "Asiatic" by the policy and were denied entry. In 1949, Calwell's successor, Harold Holt, allowed the remaining 800 non-white refugees to apply for residency, and also allowed Japanese "war brides" to settle in Australia. In the meantime, Holt continued Calwell's policy of encouraging mass immigration from Europe, and Australia admitted large numbers of immigrants from mostly Italy, Poland, Greece and Yugoslavia, as well as its traditional source of immigration, the British Isles. The Australian Government promoted the assimilation of migrants to Australia from continental Europe, who were expected to become mainstream Australians. In 1947, Australian immigration law, which had until had been based on encouraging British immigration, was amended to take in more European immigration. The way that Australia took in a large number of European immigrants from countries that were previously considered undesirable weakened the case for Australia as a primarily "British" country and led to demands for the end of the White Australia policy. Given that the purpose of the White Australia policy was to preserve Australia as a British country, it is notable that some of the strongest critics of the White Australia policy in the 1950s were liberal British professors serving at Australian universities. In 1959, the Immigration Reform Group was founded at Melbourne University to champion for the abolition of the policy.

=== Relaxation of restrictions ===
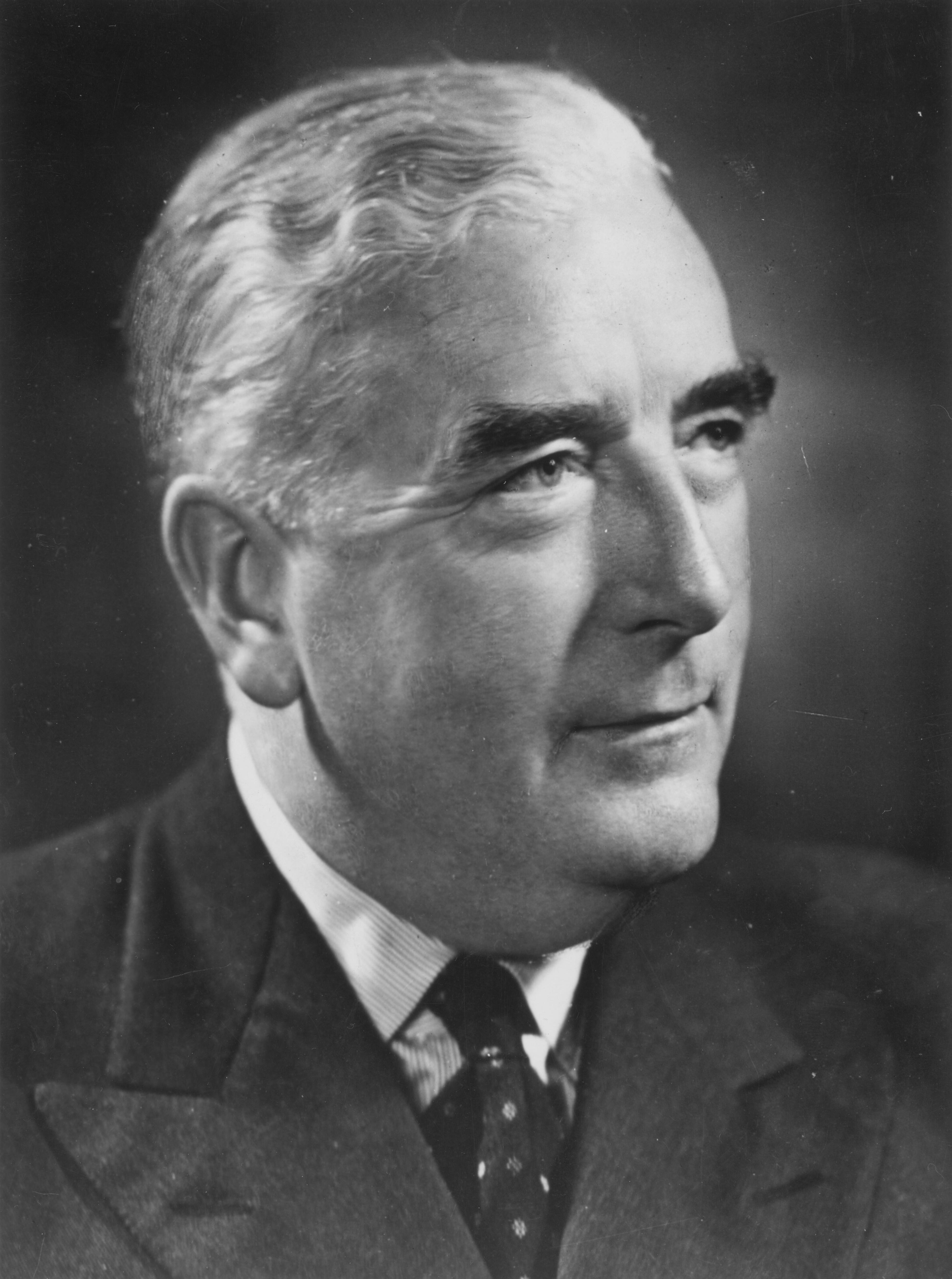
Sir Robert Menzies. The Menzies government abolished the dictation test in 1958.

Australian policy began to shift towards significantly increasing immigration. Legislative changes over the next few decades continuously opened up immigration in Australia.

Labor Party Chifley government:

- 1947: The Chifley Labor government relaxed the Immigration Restriction Act allowing non-Europeans the right to settle permanently in Australia for business reasons.

Liberal-Country Party Menzies government (1949–1966):

- 1949: Immigration Minister Holt permitted 800 non-European refugees to stay, and Japanese war brides to be admitted.
- 1950: External Affairs Minister Percy Spender instigated the Colombo Plan, under which students from Asian countries were admitted to study at Australian universities, though many more came as privately sponsored students.
- 1957: Non-Europeans with 15 years' residence in Australia were allowed to become citizens.
- 1958: Migration Act 1958 abolished the dictation test and introduced a simpler system for entry. Immigration Minister Sir Alick Downer announced that "distinguished and highly qualified Asians" might immigrate.
- 1959: Australians were permitted to sponsor Asian spouses for citizenship.
- 1964: Conditions of entry for people of non-European origin were relaxed.

This was despite comments Menzies made in a discussion with radio 2UE's Stewart Lamb in 1955, where he appeared to be a defender of the White Australia Policy.

Menzies: "I don't want to see reproduced in Australia the kind of problem they have in South Africa or in America or increasingly in Great Britain. I think it's been a very good policy and it's been of great value to us and most of the criticism of it that I've ever heard doesn't come from these oriental countries it comes from wandering Australians."

Lamb: "For these years of course in the past Sir Robert you have been described as a racist."

Menzies: "Have I?"

Lamb: "I have read this, yes."

Menzies: "Well if I were not described as a racist I'd be the only public man who hasn't been."

The Democratic Labor Party (DLP) then the third largest party, started opposing the White Australia policy as early as 1957.

In 1963, a paper, "Immigration: Control or Colour Bar?", was published by a group of students and academics at Melbourne University. It proposed eliminating the White Australia policy and was influential towards this end.

=== End of the White Australia policy ===
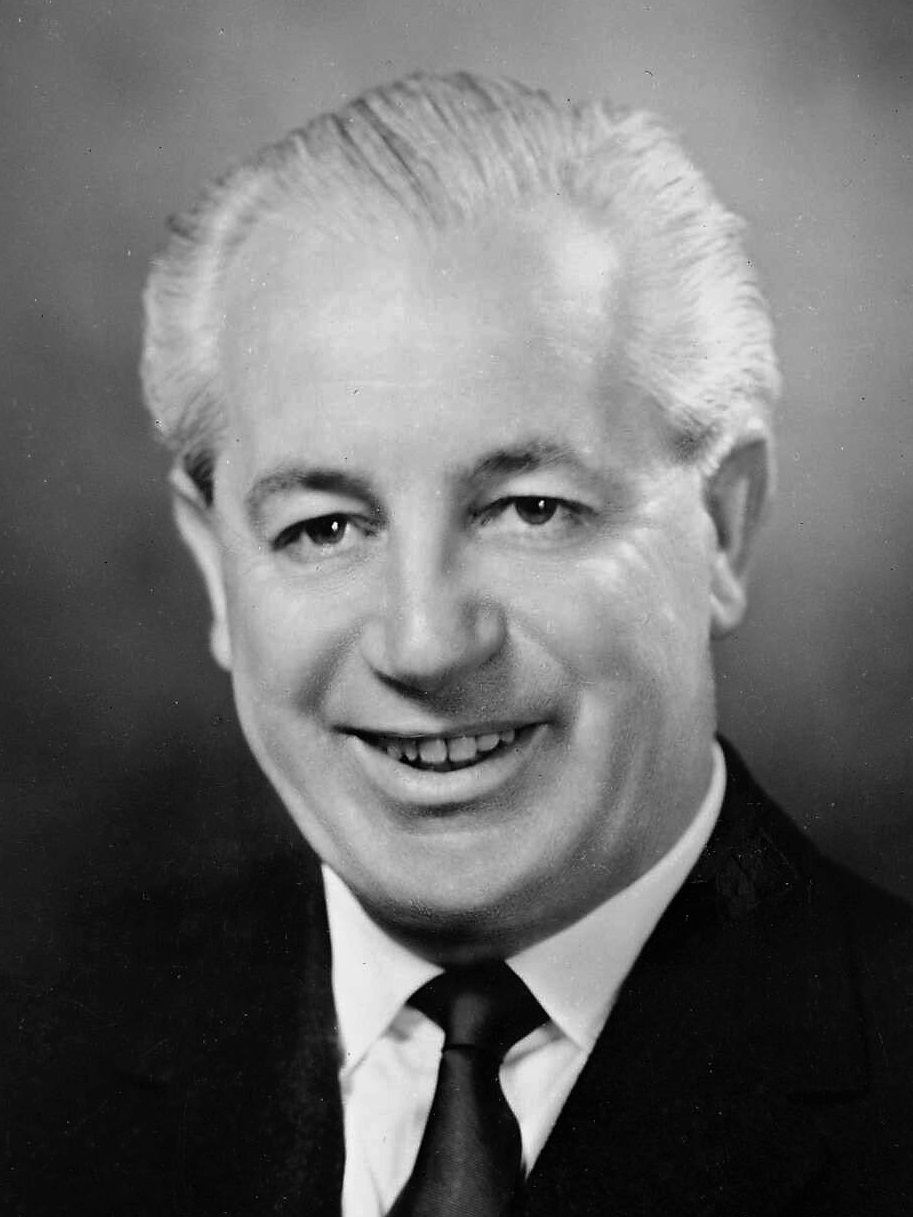
Harold Holt. The Holt government began dismantling the White Australia policy

In July 1966, Prime Minister Harold Holt stated that Australia no longer had a White Australia policy, but instead had a "restricted immigration policy". Earlier in the year he and immigration minister Hubert Opperman had announced a significant liberalisation of immigration laws for non-whites. These included reducing the waiting time for non-whites to obtain citizenship from fifteen years to five years and allowed for family reunification. Non-white immigrants would be admitted on the basis that they were "well-qualified", rather than "highly qualified and distinguished" as had been the case since 1956. According to The Canberra Times the changes would allow around 5,000 non-whites to obtain citizenship.

In January 1971, Prime Minister John Gorton stated that his government aimed to establish a multi-racial society in Australia and committed to abolishing racial discrimination. However he stated that there was still a need to restrict non-white immigration. He had earlier stated that the White Australia policy was not morally justifiable, but that "the unlimited influx of colored people would lead to stresses in Australia".

Labor Party members Don Dunstan and Gough Whitlam set about removing the White Australia Policy from the Labor platform. Attempts in 1959 and 1961 failed, with Labor leader Arthur Calwell stating, "It would ruin the Party if we altered the immigration policy ... it was only cranks, long hairs, academics and do-gooders who wanted the change." However, Dunstan persisted in his efforts, and in 1965, the White Australia Policy was removed from the Labor platform at their national conference; Dunstan personally took credit for the change.

In 1966, the Holt Liberal government modified the White Australia policy in an effort to reduce the strong perception of Australia's anti-Asian racism. After a review of immigration policy in March 1966, Immigration Minister Hubert Opperman announced applications for migration would be accepted from well-qualified people "on the basis of their suitability as settlers, their ability to integrate readily and their possession of qualifications positively useful to Australia". At the same time, Holt's government decided to allow foreign non-whites to become permanent residents and citizens after five years (the same as for Europeans), and also removed discriminatory provisions in family reunification policies.

After the removal of official discrimination, preference was still given to Asian migrants of European or racially mixed appearance. A report on the Filipino community of Sydney in 1966 observed that its members – numbering approximately 100 – were all "white" looking, or in Filipino terms, "mestizos" of presumably Spanish descent. "The Filipino Consul General stated that he was the only 'colored Filipino' in Sydney."

Nevertheless, the annual non-European settler arrivals rose from 746 in 1966 to 2,696 in 1971, while annual part-European settler arrivals rose from 1,498 to 6,054.

Leader of the Labor Party from 1960 to 1967 Arthur Calwell supported the White Australia policy. This is reflected by Calwell's comments in his 1972 memoirs, Be Just and Fear Not, in which he made it clear that he maintained his view that non-European people should not be allowed to settle in Australia. He wrote:

I am proud of my white skin, just as a Chinese is proud of his yellow skin, a Japanese of his brown skin, and the Indians of their various hues from black to coffee-coloured. Anybody who is not proud of his race is not a man at all. And any man who tries to stigmatise the Australian community as racist because they want to preserve this country for the white race is doing our nation great harm... I reject, in conscience, the idea that Australia should or ever can become a multi-racial society and survive.

The Australian Workers' Union (AWU) abandoned its support for the White Australia policy in 1972.

The Whitlam Labor government brought about the comprehensive legal end of the White Australia policy in 1973 as prime minister. The Whitlam Labor government implemented a series of amendments preventing the enforcement of racial aspects of the immigration law. These amendments:

- Legislated that all migrants, regardless of origin, be eligible to obtain citizenship after three years of permanent residence.
- Ratified all international agreements relating to immigration and race.
- Issued policy to totally disregard race as a factor in selecting migrants.

The Racial Discrimination Act 1975 made the use of racial criteria for any official purpose illegal.

It was not until the Fraser Liberal government's review of immigration law in 1978 that all selection of prospective migrants based on country of origin was entirely removed from official policy.

In 1981, the minister for immigration announced a special humanitarian assistance programme (SHP) for Iranians to seek refuge in Australia and by 1988 some 2,500 Bahá'ís and many more others had arrived in Australia through either SHP or refugee programmes. The last selective immigration policy, offering relocation assistance to British nationals, was finally removed in 1982.

=== Aftermath ===
Australia's contemporary immigration programme has two components: a programme for skilled and family migrants and a humanitarian programme for refugees and asylum seekers. By 2010, the post-war immigration programme had received more than 6.5 million migrants. The population tripled in the six decades to around 21 million in 2010, comprising people originating from 200 countries.

== Legacy ==
=== Contemporary demographics ===
In 2019, Australia has the world's eighth-largest immigrant population, with immigrants accounting for 34% of the population, a higher proportion than in any other nation with a population of over 10 million. 162,417 permanent immigrants were admitted to Australia in 2017–18. Most immigrants are skilled, but the immigration quota includes categories for family members and refugees. In 2018 the five largest immigrant groups were those born in England (4%), Mainland China (2.6%), India (2.4%), New Zealand (2.3%) and the Philippines (1.1%).

In the 2016 Australian census, the most commonly nominated ancestries were: (Note: As a percentage of 21,769,209 persons who nominated their ancestry at the 2016 census. The Australian Census collects information on ancestry, but not on race or ethnicity.)

- English (36.1%)
- Australian (33.5%) (Note: The Australian Bureau of Statistics has stated that most who nominate "Australian" as their ancestry are part of the Anglo-Celtic group.)
- Irish (11.0%)
- Scottish (9.3%)
- Chinese (5.6%)
- Italian (4.6%)
- German (4.5%)
- Indian (2.8%)
- Indigenous (2.8%) (Note: Of any ancestry. Includes those identifying as Aboriginal Australians or Torres Strait Islanders. Indigenous identification is separate to the ancestry question on the Australian Census and persons identifying as Aboriginal or Torres Strait Islander may identify any ancestry.)
- Greek (1.8%)
- Dutch (1.6%)
- Filipino (1.4%)
- Vietnamese (1.4%)
- Lebanese (1%)

=== Political and social legacy ===
The story of Australia since the Second World War – and particularly since the final relegation of the White Australia Policy – has been one of ever-increasing ethnic and cultural diversity. Successive governments have sustained a large program of multi-ethnic immigration from all continents.

Discrimination on the basis of race or ethnicity was legally permitted until 1975. Australia's new official policy on racial diversity is: "to build on our success as a culturally diverse, accepting and open society, united through a shared future". The White Australia policy continues to be mentioned in modern contexts, although it is generally only mentioned by politicians when denouncing their opposition. As Leader of the Opposition, John Howard argued for restricting Asian immigration in 1988 as part of his One Australia policy; in August 1988, he said:

I do believe that if it is – in the eyes of some in the community – that it's too great, it would be in our immediate-term interest and supporting of social cohesion if it [Asian immigration] were slowed down a little, so the capacity of the community to absorb it was greater.

Howard later retracted and apologised for the remarks, and was returned to the leadership of the Liberal Party in 1995. The Howard government (1996–2007) in turn ran a large programme of non-discriminatory immigration and, according to the Australian Bureau of Statistics, Asian countries became an increasingly important source of immigration over the decade from 1996 to 2006, with the proportion of migrants from Southern and Central Asian countries doubling from 7% to 14%. The proportion of immigrants from Sub-Saharan Africa also increased. By 2005–06, China and India were the third and fourth largest sources of all migration (after New Zealand and the United Kingdom). In 2005–06, there were 180,000 permanent additions of migrants to Australia (72% more than the number in 1996–97). This figure included around 17,000 through the humanitarian programme, of whom Iraqis and Sudanese accounted for the largest portions. China became Australia's biggest source of migrants for the first time in 2009, surpassing New Zealand and Britain.

The Australian historian John Fitzgerald wrote that the White Australia policy, with its definition that to be Australian was to be white, had a powerful impact on forging the identity of the Chinese-Australian community as a marginalised community. Fitzgerald noted that even in the early 21st century, many Chinese-Australians who had been born and grew up in Australia automatically referred to white Australians as "the Australians" and to themselves as "the Chinese".

Historian Geoffrey Blainey achieved mainstream recognition for the anti-multiculturalist cause when he wrote that multiculturalism threatened to transform Australia into a "cluster of tribes". In his 1984 book All for Australia, Blainey criticised multiculturalism for tending to "emphasise the rights of ethnic minorities at the expense of the majority of Australians" and also for tending to be "anti-British", even though "people from the United Kingdom and Ireland form the dominant class of pre-war immigrants and the largest single group of post-war immigrants."

According to Blainey, such a policy, with its "emphasis on what is different and on the rights of the new minority rather than the old majority," was unnecessarily creating division and threatened national cohesion. He argued that "the evidence is clear that many multicultural societies have failed and that the human cost of the failure has been high" and warned that "we should think very carefully about the perils of converting Australia into a giant multicultural laboratory for the assumed benefit of the peoples of the world."

In one of his numerous criticisms of multiculturalism, Blainey wrote:

For the millions of Australians who have no other nation to fall back upon, multiculturalism is almost an insult. It is divisive. It threatens social cohesion. It could, in the long-term, also endanger Australia's military security because it sets up enclaves which in a crisis could appeal to their own homelands for help.

Blainey remained a persistent critic of multiculturalism into the 1990s, denouncing multiculturalism as "morally, intellectually and economically ... a sham". The British historian Andrew Roberts, in his 2006 book A History of the English-Speaking Peoples Since 1900 praised the White Australia policy as being necessary to "protect Australia as an English-speaking nation". Roberts wrote the White Australia policy was the "right" immigration policy to pursue as he accused Asian immigrants of spreading infectious diseases and stated "Australia had the right (and duty) to protect herself" from Asian immigration. Views such as those expressed by Roberts have been in the minority. In 2009, the Australian historian Erin Ihde described the White Australia policy as "discredited" both within the historians' community and with the general public. Ihde wrote that the White Australia policy remains a difficult subject within the Australian popular memory of the past as it was the fear of the so-called "Yellow Peril" in the form of Asian immigration and the possibility of Asian nations such as China and Japan posing a military threat to Australia that played a major role in the formation of the Australian federation in 1901. Ihde argued the White Australia policy was not an aberration in Australian history, nor was it marginal, making it problematic to integrate into a positive view of Australian history.

Despite the overall success and generally bipartisan support for Australia's multi-ethnic immigration programme, there remain voices of opposition to immigration within the Australian electorate. At its peak, Pauline Hanson's One Nation Party received 9% of the national vote at the 1998 Federal Election.

Hanson was widely accused of trying to take Australia back to the days of the White Australia policy, particularly through reference to Arthur Calwell, one of the policy's strongest supporters. In her maiden address to the Australian Parliament following the 1996 election, Hanson said:

I and most Australians want our immigration policy radically reviewed and that of multiculturalism abolished. I believe we are in danger of being swamped by Asians. Between 1984 and 1995, 40 per cent of all migrants coming into this country were of Asian origin. They have their own culture and religion, form ghettos and do not assimilate.

Hanson's remarks generated wide interest in the media both nationally and internationally, but she herself did not retain her seat in Parliament at the 1998 election or subsequent 2001 and 2004 federal elections. Hanson also failed to win election in the 2003 and 2011 New South Wales state elections. In May 2007, Hanson, with her new Pauline's United Australia Party, continued her call for a freeze on immigration, arguing that African migrants carried disease into Australia. Hanson returned to politics in 2014 and ran in the Queensland election. She won a Queensland senate seat in the 2016 election, and retained it again in 2022. In 2018, Hanson said she opposes the White Australia policy.

Topics related to racism and immigration in Australia are still regularly connected by the media to the White Australia policy. Some examples of issues and events where this connection has been made include: reconciliation with Indigenous Australians; mandatory detention and the "Pacific Solution"; the 2005 Cronulla riots, and the 2009 attacks on Indians in Australia. Former opposition Labor party leader Mark Latham, in his book The Latham Diaries, described the ANZUS alliance as a legacy of the White Australia policy.

In 2007, the Howard government proposed an Australian Citizenship Test intended "to get that balance between diversity and integration correct in future, particularly as we now draw people from so many different countries and so many different cultures". The draft proposal contained a pamphlet introducing Australian history, Culture and Democracy. Migrants were to be required to correctly answer at least 12 out of 20 questions on such topics in a citizenship quiz. Migrants would also be required to demonstrate an adequate level of understanding of the English language. The Rudd government reviewed and then implemented the proposal in 2009.

On 14 August 2018, Senator Fraser Anning delivered his maiden speech to the Senate. In it, he called for a plebiscite to reintroduce the White Australia Policy, especially with regard to excluding Muslims (even though Muslims come from different races). He was criticised by politicians from the left and the right, in particular for his choice of words ("final solution"). He was again criticised by politicians across the board after blaming Muslim immigration to New Zealand for the 2019 Christchurch mosque attacks.

Surveys from 2018 and 2023 have found that over 15% polled have shown support for discrimination when it comes to immigration intake. Support for discrimination was higher on basis of religion than race or ethnicity.

== See also ==
- Anti-Chinese legislation in the United States
- Apartheid
- Australian nationalism
- Black Codes and Jim Crow laws
- Blackbirding
- Casta
- Europeans in Oceania
- Head tax (Canada) (1885–1923) and Chinese Immigration Act, 1923 (1923–1947)
- Head tax (New Zealand) (1881–1944)
- Immigration Act of 1924
- Natives Land Act, 1913 and Apartheid
- Racism in Australia
- Settler colonialism
- White demographic decline
- Genocide of Indigenous Australians

== Sources ==
- ABC Education (23 October 2024). "The White Australia policy". Australian Broadcasting Corporation.
- Jupp, James (1 January 1995). "Ethnic and Cultural Diversity in Australia". Commonwealth of Australia: Australian Bureau of Statistics. Archived from the original on 20 April 2016.
