= A Short History of Christianity =

Book by Geoffrey Blainey

- Author: Geoffrey Blainey
- Subject: History of Christianity
- Publisher: Penguin Group
- Publication date: 2011
- Media type: Hard cover

A Short History of Christianity is a non-fiction book on the history of the Christian religion written by the Australian historian Geoffrey Blainey. First published in 2011 by Penguin Books, it describes the history of Christianity, from its foundations to the present day. The book was shortlisted for the Australian Prime Minister's Literary Awards in 2012.

== The author ==
Geoffrey Blainey is a prolific Australian historian with an international following. Previous works include the best selling A Short History of the World. He has been honoured by Australia and received a Britannica Award for his contributions to learning.

== The book ==
A Short History of Christianity describes many of the significant figures of Christian history, from Jesus through Martin Luther, Francis Xavier and John Wesley and others; and follows Christianity's path at the "centre of world history". It also examines critics and rivals of Christianity and considers the future of Christianity.

This book is not to be confused by books of the same name by Archibald G. Baker, John M. Robertson, or Martin E. Marty.

== Critical reception ==
In shortlisting the work for the 2012 Prime Minister's Literary Awards, the judges described Blainey as demonstrating that he was one of Australia's "finest writers", who had with "practiced thoroughness, fairness and clarity" provided a "sweeping and lucid account" of Christianity: " Neither blind disciple, nor steely-eyed sceptic, Blainey tracks 2000 years of evidence, from the life of Jesus, to the impact of Charles Darwin and beyond. It takes a writer of rare skill to traverse a passive as well as active and often violent history. He complements ecumenical accounting with intellectual curiosity to create a manual for all who seek to know as well as to believe."

Dr Rachael Kohn discussed the book with Blainey in a Radio National Breakfast broadcast on Christmas morning in 2011. She described the book as a grand narrative that "walks the tightrope between the account of a ‘true believer’ and a historian who takes the view that Christianity’s remarkable achievement lies in its diversity and ability to re-invent itself".

The Reverend Peter Kurti, a research fellow at the Centre for Independent Studies wrote a positive review of the book, saying "Blainey's great strengths is that he is a superb story-teller and goes to great lengths to get the story right so that lay readers, particularly those with little knowledge of Christianity, can follow the thread and judge for themselves the extent of Christian influence on the world."
