= The Tyranny of Distance (book) =

1966 book by Geoffrey Blainey

- Cover of 2001 paperback edition
- Author: Geoffrey Blainey
- Language: English
- Subject: History of Australia
- Publisher: Sun Books
- Publication date: 1966
- Publication place: Australia
- Pages: 365 (1968 illustrated edition)

The Tyranny of Distance: How Distance Shaped Australia's History is a 1966 history book by Australian historian Geoffrey Blainey.

== History ==
First published in 1966, the book examines how Australia's geographical remoteness, particularly from Great Britain, has been central to shaping the country's history and identity and will continue to shape its future. The long distance between Australia and the centre of the British Empire, along with the United States, made Australians unsure of their future economic prosperity.

Blainey writes about how the tyranny had been mostly surmounted and may have even worked in Australia's favour in some ways.

In one of the book's early chapters, Blainey challenges the notion that Australia was colonised by the British in the 18th century solely to serve as a place of exile for convicts. Blainey's assertion that broader strategic and commercial factors also influenced Britain's decision to establish a penal settlement in New South Wales led to significant debate among Australian historians.

The expression "the tyranny of distance" from the book's title has become common parlance in Australia. Although Blainey is widely credited with coining the term in his 1966 work, the term appeared five years previously in the geographic research of William Bunge. Bunge uses the term in quotation marks, indicating that the phrase may have had earlier usage.

Reflecting on the 50th anniversary of the book's publication, historian Graeme Davison stated: "The Tyranny of Distance changed our map of the Australian past. It was a bestseller and a mind-changer... Few books on Australia have been as popular and influential."

During the COVID-19 pandemic, a news article in the conservative magazine Quadrant cited the book in relation to how Australia's relative isolation from China's viral epicentre may have been favourable in containing the virus within Australia.
