= Aliens Deportation Act 1948 =

Repealed Australian deportation act

Parliament of Australia
- Long title: An Act to provide for the Deportation of certain Aliens.
- Citation: No. 84 of 1948
- Enacted by: Australian House of Representatives
- Royal assent: 21 December 1948
- Repealed: 1 June 1959
- Introduced by: Arthur Calwell

Repealed by
- Migration Act 1958
- Status: Repealed

The Aliens Deportation Act 1948 (Cth) was an Act of the Parliament of Australia which formed part of the White Australia policy. The Act gave the government sweeping powers to deport aliens.

== Background ==
Minister for Immigration Arthur Calwell, who introduced the Act, explained the Act targeted "those aliens whose character and conduct are such that they should not be allowed to continue to reside here, but whose deportation cannot be effected at present because of the limitations upon the Commonwealth’s immigration powers". Despite criticism in parliament about its broad powers, the Act commenced 18 January 1949.

== Legacy ==
Shortly after coming into force, the Act was put into question by O'Keefe v Calwell (1948), which ruled in favour of Annie O’Keefe, an Indonesian wartime evacuee who had been issued a deportation order. After this defeat, Calwell sought legislation to close the loophole, leading to the War-time Refugees Removal Act 1949.
