= All for Australia =

1984 book by Geoffrey Blainey

- Author: Geoffrey Blainey
- Published: 1984
- Publication place: Australia
- ISBN: 0454008287

All for Australia is a 1984 book by Australian historian Professor Geoffrey Blainey. It criticises Australian immigration policy and the direction in which it is pushing the country. The book examines the way policy developed in the 1970s and 1980s and explores what Blainey views as the disproportionately high levels of Asian immigration to Australia since the mid-1970s.

== Synopsis ==
In All for Australia, Blainey argues:

- For the sake of national unity, the typical nation practises discrimination against migrants on the basis of ethnicity. Ironically, the Asian countries that Australia is too afraid to "offend" have no hesitation in using that right to retain their current ethnic compositions.
- Every nation relies on a sense of community belonging, which can easily be damaged by the rapid entry of foreign people who unintentionally erode national cohesion.
- Immigration is one of the most important issues facing a nation. The notion that it is too contentious to be publicly debated makes a mockery of democracy.
- Multiculturalism tends to emphasise the rights of ethnic minorities at the expense of the majority of Australians, thus unnecessarily encouraging division and threatening social cohesion.
- The policy of multiculturalism has tended to be implicitly anti-British, despite Australia's British colonial heritage and the large number of British immigrants to Australia after World War II.
- Australian immigration policy has moved from one extreme to another, from a policy that sought to encourage European immigration and restrict Asian immigration (White Australia policy) to a policy that now gives disproportionate preference to Asian immigration. Blainey asserts that the preferential treatment of Asian immigrants arose partly from a sense of guilt over the Vietnam War, but it also reflected Canberra's misguided view that more trade with Asian countries would come with a larger Asian population.

== Critical reception ==
Writing about the book in Australian Book Review John McKay was not impressed: "This is certainly a bad book. The arguments are badly put, sometimes verging on the ludicrous...Professor Blainey dismisses the assumption that Australia is part of Asia and regrets policies that might be construed as anti-British." He did, however, find some merit in the work: "There are challenges that have to be met, even though this book is not one of them, and the current debate may in the end be seen to have encouraged serious discussions about alternative futures."
