= Art and Illusion =

Art theory and history book

- First edition
- Author: Ernst Gombrich
- Language: English
- Genre: Art history
- Publisher: Pantheon Books (Bollingen series)
- Publication date: 1960
- Publication place: United States
- Media type: Print
- Pages: 443pp.
- ISBN: 0691097852

Art and Illusion, A Study in the Psychology of Pictorial Representation, is a 1960 book of art theory and history by Ernst Gombrich, derived from the 1956 A. W. Mellon Lectures in the Fine Arts. The book had a wide impact in art history, but also in history (e.g. Carlo Ginzburg, who called it "splendid"), aesthetics (e.g. Nelson Goodman's Languages of Art), semiotics (Umberto Eco's Theory of Semiotics), and music psychology (Robert O. Gjerdingen's schema theory of Galant style music).

In Art and Illusion, Gombrich argues for the importance of "schemata" in analyzing works of art: he claims that artists can only learn to represent the external world by learning from previous artists, so representation is always done using stereotyped figures and methods.
