= War-time Refugees Removal Act 1949 =

Parliament of Australia
- Long title: An Act to provide for the Removal from Australia of certain Persons who entered Australia during the Period of Hostilities.
- Assented to: 12 July 1949
- Repealed: 31 December 1973
- Introduced by: Arthur Calwell
- Status: Repealed

The War-time Refugees Removal Act 1949 was a piece of Australian legislation that formed part of the White Australia policy. It was introduced by the Chifley government in July 1949, in order to give the federal government the explicit authority to deport non-white foreigners who had arrived in Australia during World War II.

The act was created in response to O'Keefe v Calwell (1948), a High Court decision that found in favour of an Indonesian woman, Annie O'Keefe, who had been issued a deportation order under the Aliens Deportation Act 1948. The Minister for Immigration, Arthur Calwell, was a strong supporter of the White Australia policy, and claimed that the High Court's decision would lead to a "mongrel Australia". The government wished to expel the 800 or so foreign non-whites who had entered Australia during World War II, and formulated a new act to eliminate the loopholes that the High Court case had uncovered. The new act, which came into force in July 1949, "empowered the minister to force any person to depart the country who had been allowed to enter as a result of the war and had not since left". Calwell made extensive use of his new powers up until the December 1949 federal election, where the Labor government was defeated. Harold Holt, the immigration minister in the incoming Menzies government, opposed the White Australia policy and declined to make use of the act's provisions, accepting the refugees as a "wartime legacy". His successors did the same, and the act was eventually formally repealed by the Statute Law Revision Act 1973.

== See also ==
- Immigration Restriction Act 1901
