= The Peaks of Lyell =

1954 book by Geoffrey Blainey

- First edition
- Author: Geoffrey Blainey
- Language: English
- Genre: History
- Publisher: Melbourne University Press
- Publication date: 1954
- Publication place: Australia

The Peaks of Lyell is a book by Geoffrey Blainey, based on his University of Melbourne MA thesis that was originally published in 1954. It contains the history of the Mount Lyell Mining and Railway Company, and through association, Queenstown and further the West Coast Tasmania.

It is one of the few history books in Australia to have a sixth edition by the year 2000 and to achieved a contininual publising

Blainey was fortunate in being able to speak to older people about the history of the West Coast, some who had known Queenstown in its earliest years.

The book gives an interesting overview from the materials and people Blainey was able to access in the early 1950s, and the omissions. Due to the nature of a company history, a number of items of Queenstown history did have alternative interpretations on events such as the 1912 North Mount Lyell Disaster, and there were residents of Queenstown living in the town as late as the 1970s who had stories that differed from the official company history.

Significant characters from the West Coast Tasmania history such as Robert Carl Sticht and James Crotty amongst a longer list probably still deserve further work on their significance in West Coast and Tasmanian history, but the book has had significant "presence" in being in print for so long.

Scholarship on some of the neglected aspects of West Coast and Queenstown history only emerged from the shadow of Blainey's work in the 2000s. In 1993 for a mining conference in Tasmania, a number of publications were produced regarding the same subject.

In 1994, when the fifth edition of Peaks of Lyell was printed, the Mount Lyell company closed down, and most of the records held by the company were donated to the State Library of Tasmania.

In 2000 the sixth edition of the book was published.

== Publication history ==
- Blainey, Geoffrey. The Peaks of Lyell, Melbourne University Press, Carlton, Vic., 1954, 310pp.
- History of Mt. Lyell [manuscript] (M.A. Thesis), University of Melbourne, 1955, 328 leaves.
- The first half of this history was presented as Geoffrey Blainey's Master of Arts thesis.
  - 2nd ed., Melbourne University Press, Carlton, Vic., 1959, 310pp.
  - 3rd ed., Melbourne University Press, Carlton, Vic.; London, 1967, 341pp.
  - 4th ed., Melbourne University Press, Carlton, Vic., 1978, 341pp.
  - 5th ed., St. David's Park Publishing, Hobart, Tas., 1993, 370pp.
- Blainey, Geoffrey (2000). The Peaks of Lyell (6th ed.). Hobart: St. David's Park Publishing. ISBN 0-7246-2265-9.
  - Sound recording of the second edition of the book.

== See also ==
- The Companion to Tasmanian History
