= O'Keefe v Calwell =

Judgement of the High Court of Australia

O’Keefe v Calwell
- Court: High Court of Australia
- Decided: 18 March 1949
- Citations: [1949] HCA 6, (1949) 77 CLR 261

Court membership
- Judges sitting: Latham CJ, Rich, Dixon, McTiernan, Williams and Webb JJ

O'Keefe v Calwell is a High Court of Australia case.

Annie O'Keefe was a Dutch subject born in the Netherlands East Indies and one of 15,000 people who were evacuated to Australia from nearby countries during World War II and given sanctuary. She arrived in Australia in September 1942 and settled in the outer Melbourne community of Bonbeach. She married an Australian, believing that the marriage would also allow her to remain, but the government issued a deportation order for Annie and her children in January 1949. Public support allowed her to challenge the deportation order.

The High Court ruled in favour of O'Keefe. This was because she had not formally been given the status of a prohibited immigrant when she was allowed to enter Australia with a certificate of exemption, so the expiration of the certificate did not make her liable to deportation as a prohibited immigrant. Nor could she be declared a prohibited immigrant more than five years after being allowed into the country. The case proved the Aliens Deportation Act 1948 a failure, leading the Minister for Immigration Arthur Calwell to push forward with the War-time Refugees Removal Act 1949.

The action in the High Court was the first successful legal challenge to the White Australia Policy.
