= Geoffrey Blainey =

Australian historian

Geoffrey Blainey AC, FAHA, FASSA,
- Born: Geoffrey Norman Blainey; 11 March 1930 (age 96); Melbourne, Victoria, Australia
- Spouse: Ann Blainey (present)
- Awards: Sir Ernest Scott Prize (1955); Australian Literature Society Gold Medal (1964); Fellow of the Royal Historical Society of Victoria (1967); Fellow of the Australian Academy of the Humanities (1969); Fellow of the Academy of the Social Sciences in Australia (1970); Captain Cook Bicentenary Literary Award (1970); Officer of the Order of Australia (1975); Britannica Award for Disseminating Knowledge (1988); Honorary Fellow of the Australasian Institute of Mining and Metallurgy (1988); Australian National Living Treasure (1997); Companion of the Order of Australia (2000); Mining Hall of Fame (2009); Tucker Medal (2013); Prime Minister's Literary Awards for History (2016)

Academic background
- Education: University of Melbourne

Academic work
- Institutions: University of Melbourne
- Notable students: Janet McCalman; Stuart Macintyre; Frank Bongiorno
- Main interests: Australian history World history
- Notable works: The Peaks of Lyell (1954); The Tyranny of Distance (1966); The Causes of War (1972); A Short History of the World (2000)

Geoffrey Norman Blainey (born 11 March 1930) is an Australian historian, academic, best selling author and commentator.

Blainey is noted for his authoritative texts on the economic and social history of Australia, including The Tyranny of Distance. He has published over 40 books, including wide-ranging histories of the world and of Christianity. He has often appeared in newspapers and on television.

Blainey held chairs in economic history and history at the University of Melbourne for over 20 years. In the 1980s, he was visiting professor of Australian Studies at Harvard University, and received the 1988 Britannica Award for 'exceptional excellence in the dissemination of knowledge for the benefit of mankind', the first historian to receive that award and was made a Companion of the Order of Australia in 2000.

Blainey was once described by Graeme Davison as the "most prolific, wide-ranging, inventive, and, in the 1980s and 1990s, most controversial of Australia's living historians". He has been chairman or member of the Australia Council, the University of Ballarat, the Australia–China Council, the Commonwealth Literary Fund and the Australian War Memorial. He chaired the National Council for the Centenary of Federation.

Blainey has appeared in lists of the most influential Australians, past or present. The National Trust lists Blainey as one of Australia's "Living Treasures". He served on the boards of philanthropic bodies, including the Ian Potter Foundation (1991–2014) and the Deafness Foundation Trust since 1993, and is patron of others.

Biographer Geoffrey Bolton in 1999 argues that he has played multiple roles as an Australian historian:

He first came to prominence in the 1950s as a pioneer in the neglected field of Australian business history ... He produced during the 1960s and 1970s a number of surveys of Australian history in which explanation was organized around the exploration of the impact of the single factor (distance, mining, pre-settlement Aboriginal society) ... Blainey next turned to the rhythms of global history in the industrial period.... Because of his authority as a historian, he was increasingly in demand as a commentator on Australian public affairs.

In 2006, the Melbourne historian John Hirst made his assessment: "Geoffrey Blainey, the most prolific and popular of our historians". Alan Atkinson, author of a three-volume history of Australia, called Blainey "our most eminent living historian" in a long review that mixes criticism with praise.

== Early life ==
Blainey was born in Melbourne and raised in a succession of Victorian country towns before attending Wesley College and the University of Melbourne. While at university he resided at Queen's College and was editor of Farrago, the newspaper of the University of Melbourne Student Union.

After graduating, Blainey took a freelance writing assignment and travelled to the Mount Lyell mining field in Tasmania to research and write the history of the Mount Lyell Mining and Railway Company, at Queenstown. In the 1950s, many older residents could remember the beginnings of the community. The resultant book, The Peaks of Lyell (1954), achieved six editions. He then wrote a history of his university: The University of Melbourne: A Centenary Portrait (1956). He married Ann Warriner Heriot in 1957, who as Ann Blainey has become an internationally regarded biographer.

Blainey has published over 40 books, including his highly acclaimed A Short History of the World. His works have ranged from sports and local histories to interpreting the motives behind the British settlement of Australia in The Tyranny of Distance; covering over two centuries of human conflict in The Causes of War (1973); examining the optimism and pessimism in Western society since 1750 in The Great See-Saw; Aboriginal Australia in Triumph of the Nomads (1975) and A Land Half Won (1980); and his exploration of the history of Christianity in A Short History of Christianity (2011). He has also written general histories of the world and the "tempestuous" 20th century.

The Tyranny of Distance has been described as one of the most popular and influential books written about Australia. In one of the book's early chapters, Blainey challenges the notion that Australia was colonised by the British in the 18th century solely to serve as a place of exile for convicts. Blainey's assertion that broader strategic and commercial factors also influenced Britain's decision to establish a penal settlement in New South Wales led to significant debate among Australian historians.

Triumph of the Nomads is "a book which has done more than any other to open Australian minds to the pre-European past of their land", according to Ken Inglis of the Australian National University. Blainey was also "the first writer to make that daring comparison that Aboriginal societies differed as much from one another as do the nations of Europe".

The Causes of War has become one of the most cited works in founding modern scholarship on international conflict: as of September 2020 it had 2095 citations on Google Scholar. It is commonly cited by the Hoover Institution as a foundational work in the field.

Blainey has revisited some of his earlier successes to take into account new discoveries and scholarship – Triumph of the Nomads and A Land Half Won were revised as The Story of the Australia's People Vol 1 : The Rise and Fall of Ancient Australia and The Story of the Australia's People Vol 2: The Rise and Rise of a New Australia.

Throughout the course of his career, Blainey has also written for newspapers and television. The Blainey View (1982) was a history of Australia shown in ten episodes on ABC television.

=== Academia ===
In 1961, he began teaching economic history at the University of Melbourne, was made a professor in 1968, and was given the Ernest Scott chair in history in 1977. In 1982 he was appointed dean of Melbourne's Faculty of Arts. From 1994 to 1998, Blainey was foundation Chancellor of the University of Ballarat. He was visiting professor of Australian Studies at Harvard University.

Blainey was on the board of the Melbourne University Press in the early 1960s, deputy dean of the Economics Faculty in the early 1970s, president of the council of Queen's College in the University of Melbourne from 1971 to 1989, and on the national selection committee for the Harkness Fellowships from 1977 to 1989 (chairman 1983–89).

=== Philanthropy and public service ===
Blainey was invited by Prime Minister Harold Holt in 1967 to sit on the advisory board of the Commonwealth Literary Fund, serving until its abolition in 1973 (chairman 1971–73). He then became inaugural chairman of the Literature Board of the Australia Council for the Arts (Later called Australia Council), set up by the Whitlam government. He served on the Council from 1977–1981. Following Whitlam's election promise to introduce a Public Lending Right Scheme for authors, Blainey was appointed chairman of the committee representing authors, publishers and librarians that, in 1973, recommended the scheme adopted by the government a year later. Australia's scheme differed from the pioneering scheme adopted in Denmark in 1946. Blainey represented writers on the small group instructed to find the new national anthem that Whitlam had promised. From that initiative came a public poll supporting the long-standing Australian patriotic song, "Advance Australia Fair".

In December 1973, Blainey was an Australian delegate to the first UNESCO conference held in Asia, in Yogyakarta, Java; it recommended cultural policies for Asia.

Blainey was deputy chairman in 1974 and 1975 of the Whitlam government's Inquiry into Museums and National Collections, whose report ultimately led to the completion in Canberra, in 2001, of the National Museum of Australia with its emphasis on indigenous history. Most of the Inquiry's report had been drafted by Blainey and his colleague, Professor JD Mulvaney.

In 1976, Blainey became an inaugural commissioner on the Australian Heritage Commission, set up by the Fraser government to decide on conservation and environmental matters. On the first council of the National Museum set up by the Hawke government in 1984 he was a short-term member.

He was chairman of the Australia Council for four years and Chairman of the Australia–China Council from its inception in 1979 until June 1984. In 2001, he was the Chairman of the National Council for the Centenary of Federation. From 1994 to 1998, he was the Foundation Chancellor of the University of Ballarat.

Blainey was an inaugural member and later the chairman of the National Council for the Centenary of Federation and spoke at the centenary celebration of the opening of the federal parliament in May 1901.He was an inaugural member and later the chairman of the National Council for the Centenary of Federation and spoke at the centenary celebration of the opening of the federal parliament in May 1901.

In 2001, Blainey presented the Boyer Lectures on the theme This Land is all Horizons: Australian Fears and Visions.

Under the Howard government, Blainey served as a member of the council of the Australian War Memorial in Canberra from 1997 to 2004, an appointment initially criticised in parliament by Laurie Brereton of the Labor opposition but approved in other circles. There was no opposition when his first three-year term was renewed.

At the Constitutional Convention, held in Canberra for 10 days in February 1998 to debate and vote on whether Australia should become a republic (and if so what kind of a republic), Blainey was a non-elected delegate. He argued that Australia was already a "de facto republic" and that any further change should be made only if the case was very powerful. With his ally, George Mye from the Torres Strait Islands, he was the leading critic of the adopted proposal that any citizen whose name was on the general electoral roll, even a migrant of only two years' standing, should automatically be eligible to be president of the proposed republic of Australia. After the decisive failure in 1999 of the referendum to make Australia a republic, Blainey and the constitutional lawyer, Professor Colin Howard, were singled out by the Australian republicans' leader, Malcolm Turnbull, as deserving a special share of the blame. He alleged that the pair had unduly shaped the official information posted to all electors. In their defence, it was contended that their influence was fair, for they operated in an official committee chaired by the neutral Sir Ninian Stephen, lawyer and former governor general.

Blainey served on the National Council for the Centenary of Federation from 1997 to 2002 (chairman from May 2001, succeeding Archbishop Peter Hollingworth), and chairman of the Council of the Centenary Medal from 2001–03. Later appointments included membership of the History Summit in Canberra in 2006 and the federal committee set up in 2007 to recommend a national curriculum for teaching Australian history.

He sat, from 1997 to 2004, on the Council of the Royal Humane Society of Australasia which recommended awards for acts of civilian bravery.

In the 1970s, 1980s and 1990s, Blainey was a weekly or fortnightly columnist for The Australian, the Melbourne Herald, or the Melbourne Age; he also wrote often for the Sydney Bulletin, the Australian Business Monthly and other national journals. Booklets listing these articles and other works have been published by the library of Monash University. The latest booklet was last updated in about 2001. As a book reviewer, he has written for many Australian, UK and US publications. His ten-part series on Australian history, "The Blainey View", appeared on ABC television in 1982–83, the ABC's most ambitious venture so far on Australian history. Graham Kennedy, the television star, narrated the continuity script.

Blainey is well known for speeches, often without notes, on historical and contemporary topics. In most anthologies of notable Australian speeches, present and past, one of his addresses is reprinted. On television and stage in later years, Max Gillies the comedian cleverly mimicked some speeches.

He has served on the boards of philanthropic bodies, including the Ian Potter Foundation from 1991 to 2015 and the Deafness Foundation Trust since 1993, and is patron of others.

Blainey has, at times, been a controversial figure. In the 1980s, he queried the level of Asian immigration to Australia and the policy of multiculturalism in speeches, articles and a book All for Australia. He was said by leftist critics to be closely aligned with the former Liberal-National Coalition government of John Howard in Australia, with Howard shadowing Blainey's conservative views on some issues, especially the view that Australian history has been hijacked by social liberals. As a result of these stances, Blainey is sometimes associated with right-wing politics. Blainey himself is a member of no political party.

== Views on Asian immigration ==
On 17 March 1984, Blainey addressed a major Rotary conference in the Victorian city of Warrnambool. He regretted that the Hawke Labor government in "a time of large unemployment" was bringing many new migrants to the areas of high unemployment, thus fostering tension. He blamed the government, not the migrants themselves. Criticising what he viewed as disproportionately high levels of Asian immigration, then running at 40 per cent of the annual intake, he added: "Rarely in the history of the modern world has a nation given such preference to a tiny ethnic minority of its population as the Australian Government has done in the past few years, making that minority the favoured majority in its immigration policy".

Three days later, in response to the prediction of the "increasing Asianisation" of Australia made by Labor's Immigration Minister Stewart West, Blainey argued: "I do not accept the view, widely held in the Federal Cabinet, that some kind of slow Asian takeover of Australia is inevitable. I do not believe that we are powerless. I do believe that we can with good will and good sense control our destiny.... As a people, we seem to move from extreme to extreme. In the past 30 years the government of Australia has moved from the extreme of wanting a white Australia to the extreme of saying that we will have an Asian Australia and that the quicker we move towards it the better".

Blainey's speech, along with subsequent articles and a book on the subject, ignited nationwide controversy, especially in the Australian federal parliament, which had not debated the principles of the immigration policy for many years. Some critics argued that Blainey's views were moderate and not racist, citing the idea that "All peoples of the world are worthy and deserve respect" was the 'prime principle' of Blainey's book, All for Australia, which he wrote on the topic. However, in All for Australia he criticised the belief that "immigration policy should primarily reflect the truth that all 'races' are equal. On the contrary, an immigration policy should not, any more than a trade or tariff policy, be designed primarily to reflect that fact". According to Blainey, the Australian government's immigration policy was increasingly being influenced by multicultural ideology to the detriment of the national interest and the majority of Australians. He argued: "We are surrendering much of our own independence to a phantom opinion that floats vaguely in the air and rarely exists on this earth. We should think very carefully about the perils of converting Australia into a giant multicultural laboratory for the assumed benefit of the peoples of the world". Blainey also warned that the "crimson thread of kinship" invoked by Sir Henry Parkes was being undermined, stating: "The cult of the immigrant, the emphasis on separateness for ethnic groups, the wooing of Asia and the shunning of Britain are part of this thread-cutting."

His views were to receive the support of a majority of Australian voters, both Labor and non-Labor voters, as a national Gallup poll confirmed in August. Victorians especially disapproved of the University of Melbourne's conduct in this matter.

In contrast, while Blainey was briefly in Europe in May, a professor and 23 other history teachers from the University distributed a public letter distancing themselves from what they called his "racialist" views. Other historians, including lecturers in Asian history, refused the request to sign the letter.

After a crowd of left-wing students and marchers broke into the heavily guarded building where Blainey was conducting a tutorial in historical research, he was advised by the university on security grounds that it must cancel all his future addresses within the University for the rest of 1984. In Brisbane on 5 July, when he gave a memorial address in honour of a deceased Queensland businessman in the Mayne Hall at the University of Queensland and chaired by the chancellor Sir James Foots, noisy protesters tried to dislocate the meeting. These and similar protests were major items in the national television news. Blainey continued to express his views periodically on television, radio and his own newspaper columns but not in his own university. He retained his main position as Dean of the Faculty of Arts.

Blainey and his family were subject to threats of violence, prompting him at the police's request to remove his name and address from the public telephone book and organise security for his home. According to fellow historian Keith Windschuttle: "The immediate consequence of all this was that Blainey, easily Australia's best and most prolific living historian, was effectively silenced from speaking at his own university.... This violation of academic freedom, clearly the worst in Australian history, provoked no protest at all from the university's academic staff association, nor from the university council, let alone his own departmental colleagues."

On the so-called "Blainey affair", Australian prime minister John Howard would remark: "Nowhere, I suggest, have the fangs of the left so visibly been on display as they were in a campaign based on character assassination and intellectual dishonesty through their efforts to trash the name and reputation of that great Australian historian Geoffrey Blainey."

In December 1988, Blainey resigned from the University of Melbourne and resumed his former career as a freelance historian. In 1994, the Victorian government appointed him to the honorary position of foundation chancellor of the new University of Ballarat.

Subsequently, in December 2007, the University of Melbourne granted a Doctor of Laws to Blainey and declared that he was, in Australia, probably a unique professional historian, noting that he had fostered wide public interest in history. The citation observed that "few graduates of this University have exerted greater influence on national life".

== Blainey and the "History Wars" ==
Blainey has been an important contributor to the debate over Australian history often referred to as the History Wars.

In his 1993 Sir John Latham Memorial Lecture, Blainey coined the phrases "Black armband view of history" versus the contrasting "three cheers" view (see History wars). The phrase "Black armband view of history" began to be used, pejoratively or otherwise, by some Australian commentators and intellectuals about historians and journalists, judges and clergymen, whom they viewed as having presented an unfairly critical portrayal of Australian history since European settlement.

Blainey coined the term the "Black armband view of history" to refer to those historians and academics, usually leftist, who denigrated Australia's past to an unusual degree and accused European Australians of genocide against Aboriginal people. Former Liberal Prime Minister Malcolm Fraser described the Australian history wars as a branch of the "culture wars" and attributed Blainey with having initiated the wider wars in his immigration speeches of 1984.

Reflecting on the Australian Bicentenary in 1988, Blainey accused some academics and journalists of depicting Australian history since European colonisation as essentially a "story of violence, exploitation, repression, racism, sexism, capitalism, colonialism, and a few other 'isms'." Blainey also accused supporters of multiculturalism of having "little respect for the history of Australia between 1788 and 1950," claiming that in their eyes "Australia was a desert between 1788 and 1950 because it was populated largely by people from the British Isles and because it seemed to have a cultural unity, a homogeneity which is the very antithesis of multiculturalism."

Blainey referred to the contrasting positive histories as the "three cheers" school.

To some extent my generation was reared on the Three Cheers view of history. This patriotic view of our past had a long run. It saw Australian history as largely a success. While the convict era was a source of shame or unease, nearly everything that came after was believed to be pretty good. There is a rival view, which I call the Black Armband view of history. In recent years it has assailed the optimistic view of history. The black armbands were quietly worn in official circles in 1988. The multicultural folk busily preached their message that until they arrived much of Australian history was a disgrace. The past treatment of Aborigines, of Chinese, of Kanakas, of non-British migrants, of women, the very old, the very young, and the poor was singled out, sometimes legitimately, sometimes not.... The Black Armband view of history might well represent the swing of the pendulum from a position that had been too favourable, too self congratulatory, to an opposite extreme that is even more unreal and decidedly jaundiced.

— Geoffrey Blainey, In Our Time, Melbourne, 1999

Critics of Blainey's article claimed that it was anti-Aboriginal. However, Blainey applauded the "many distinctive merits" of the traditional Aboriginal way of life. Moreover, Blainey's earlier book Triumph of the Nomads, was highly sympathetic to Aboriginal people, as the title indicates. It is still said to be the only narrative history of Aboriginal Australia before 1788, and a pioneering work. It was listed by the National Book Council in 1984 as one of the ten most significant Australian books of the previous 10 years. Blainey has been critical of Bruce Pascoe's work, Dark Emu, regarding Aboriginal life prior to 1788 stating that there existed "no evidence that there was ever a permanent town in pre-1788 Australia with 1000 inhabitants who gained most of their food by farming" as claimed by Pascoe.

During the launch of his 2015 book The Story of Australia's People Volume 1: The Rise and Fall of Ancient Australia, Blainey predicted the History Wars would continue in the public arena for some time as "it is in the nature of history and of most intellectual activities, and the more so in a nation where the main strands of history — Aboriginal and European — are utterly different."

In June 2020, Blainey was critical of iconoclastic destructions of historical monuments and public statues following the George Floyd protests. Blainey viewed the destructions as rallying against Western civilization, calling for a tempered approach to acknowledging the West's virtues, in addition to its shortcomings.

== Awards ==
Geoffrey Blainey was made a Fellow of the Royal Historical Society of Victoria in 1967. In 1975 he was made an Officer of the Order of Australia for his contribution to Australian literature. He was awarded a Companion of the Order of Australia in the Australia Day Honours list of 2000 for his service to academia, research and scholarship. The following year he was awarded a Centenary Medal for his services to the Centenary of Federation, of which he was Council chairman in 2001 and previously a member.

At the United Nations in New York in 1988, he was one of five intellectuals, including the American economist John Kenneth Galbraith and the Mexican poet Octavio Paz, who were awarded gold medals for "excellence in the dissemination of knowledge for the benefit of mankind". Blainey's book The Causes of War, much read in military academies and American universities, was said to be one reason for the award.

He is an emeritus professor of the University of Melbourne, and a fellow of the Australian Academy of the Humanities and of the Academy of Social Sciences in Australia.

In 2002 the degree of Doctor of Letters was conferred on Professor Blainey in recognition of his contribution to the University of Ballarat and the community in general.

In 2010, Blainey was Victorian State finalist for Senior Australian of the Year.

In 2016 Blainey's The Story of Australia's People Volume 1: The Rise and Fall of Ancient Australia won the Prime Minister's Literary Awards for History.

The University of Melbourne has established "The Geoffrey Blainey Scholarship for Honours in Economic History" for students undertaking academic study in economic history in honour of Blainey's academic contributions.

== Works ==
- Blainey, Geoffrey (1954). The Peaks of Lyell. Carlton South, Vic.: Melbourne University Press.
- — (1956). The University of Melbourne : a centenary portrait. With illustrations by N. H. Oliver. Carlton, Vic.: Melbourne University Press.
- Johns and Waygood, 1856–1956, Caulfield & Sons, Melbourne, 1956.
- A Centenary History of the University of Melbourne, Melbourne University Press, Carlton, Vic.; London, Cambridge University Press, 1957.
- Gold and Paper: A history of The National Bank of Australasia, Georgian House, Melbourne, Victoria (Australia) 1958.
- Mines in the Spinifex: The Story of Mount Isa Mines, Angus and Robertson, Sydney, NSW, 1960.
- The Rush That Never Ended: A History of Australian Mining, Melbourne University Press, Melbourne, Vic., 1963.
- A History of Camberwell, Jacaranda Press in association with the Camberwell City Council, Brisbane, 1964.
- The Tyranny of Distance: How Distance Shaped Australia's History, Sun Books, Melbourne, Vic., 1966.
- Wesley College: The First Hundred Years, Robertson & Mullens, Melbourne, 1967 (with J. H. Morrissey and S. E .K. Hulme )
- The Rise of Broken Hill, Macmillan of Australia, Melbourne, Vic., 1968.
- Across a Red World, Macmillan, Melbourne, Vic., 1968.
- The Steel Master: A Life of Essington Lewis, Macmillan of Australia, South Melbourne, Vic., 1971, ISBN 9780333119624.
- The Causes of War, Macmillan, London, 1973.
- Triumph of the Nomads: A History of Ancient Australia, Macmillan, South Melbourne, Vic., 1975. SBN 333 17583 2
- — (1980). A land half won. South Melbourne, Vic.: Macmillan.
- The Blainey View: Book of the ABC Television Series, Macmillan, South Melbourne, Vic., 1982
- Gold and Paper 1858–1982: A History of the National Bank of Australasia, Macmillan, South Melbourne, 1983.
- Our Side of the Country: The Story of Victoria, Metheun Haynes, North Ryde, N.S.W., 1984.
- All for Australia, Methuen Haynes, North Ryde, N.S.W., 1984.
- Making History, McPhee Gribble & Penguin, Ringwood, 1985 (with CMH Clark and RM Crawford).
- The Great Seesaw: A New View of the Western World, 1750–2000, Macmillan, South Melbourne Vic., Basingstoke, 1988.
- A Game of Our Own: The Origins of Australian Football, Information Australia, Melbourne, Vic., 1990.
- Odd Fellows: A History of IOOF Australia, Allen & Unwin, Sydney, N.S.W., 1991.
- Blainey, Eye on Australia: Speeches and Essays of Geoffrey Blainey, Schwartz Books, Melbourne, Vic., 1991.
- Sites of the Imagination: Contemporary Photographers View Melbourne and Its People, National Gallery of Victoria, Melbourne, 1992 (with Isobel Crombie).
- Jumping Over the Wheel, Allen & Unwin, St. Leonards, N.S.W., 1993.
- The Golden Mile, Allen & Unwin, St. Leonards, 1993.
- A Shorter History of Australia, William Heinemann Australia, Port Melbourne, Vic., 1994.
- White Gold: The Story of Alcoa of Australia, Allen & Unwin, St. Leonards, N.S.W., 1997.
- In Our Time, Information Australia, Melbourne, Vic., 1999.
- A History of the AMP 1848–1998, Allen & Unwin, St Leonards, N.S.W., 1999.
- A Short History of the World, Penguin Books Australia Ltd., Vic., 2000.
- This Land is All Horizons: Australia's Fears and Visions, (Boyer Lectures) ABC Books, Sydney, 2001.
- A Very Short History of the World, Penguin Books Australia Ltd., Vic., 2004.
- Black Kettle & Full Moon: Daily Life in a Vanished Australia, Penguin Books Australia Ltd., Vic., 2004.
- A Short History of the Twentieth Century, Penguin Books Australia Ltd., Vic., 2006. ISBN 9780143006145
- A History of Victoria, Cambridge University Press, New York, 2006.
- Sea of Dangers: Captain Cook and His Rivals, Penguin Books Australia Ltd., Vic., 2009.ISBN 9781742282336
- A Short History of Christianity, Penguin Books Australia Ltd., Vic., 2011. ISBN 9780670075249
- The Story of Australia's People, Volume 1: The Rise and Fall of Ancient Australia, Penguin Books Australia Ltd., Vic., 2015 ISBN 9780670078714
- "Australian Exceptionalism. A Personal View" in Only in Australia. The History, Politics and Economics of Australian Exceptionalism, Oxford University Press, 2016.
- The Story of Australia's People, Volume 2: The Rise and Rise of a New Australia, Penguin Books Australia Ltd., Vic., 2016.ISBN 9780670078028
- Before I Forget: An Early Memoir, Hamish Hamilton, 2019. ISBN 9781760890339
- Captain Cook's Epic Voyage, (revision of Sea of Dangers), Viking, 2020. ISBN 978-1-76089-509-9

=== Book reviews ===
Date	Review article	Work(s) reviewed
1995	Blainey, Geoffrey (October 1995). "A pre-eminent Victorian". Quadrant. 39 (10): 78–79.	Galbally, Ann (1995). Redmond Barry: an Anglo-Irish Australian. Melbourne University Press.
2013	Blainey, Geoffrey (April 2013). "Book of relics: a kind of secular family Bible". Australian Book Review. 350: 47–48.	Anderson, Nola (2012). Australian War Memorial: treasures from a century of collecting. Millers Point, NSW: Murdoch Books.

== Biographies ==
- Allsop, Richard (December 2019). Geoffrey Blainey: writer, historian, controversialist. Monash University Publishing. ISBN 978-1-925835-62-5.
- Deborah Gare; Geoffrey Bolton; Stuart Macintyre; Tom Stannage, eds. (2003). The Fuss that Never Ended: The Life and Work of Geoffrey Blainey. Melbourne, Victoria: Melbourne University Press. ISBN 0-522-85034-0.
