= A Short History of the World (Blainey book) =

Geoffery Blainey book published in 2000

- Author: Geoffrey Blainey
- Subject: General history
- Publisher: Penguin Books
- Publication date: 2000
- Media type: Hard cover
- Pages: 669
- ISBN: 0-670-88036-1
- OCLC: 45755675

A Short History of the World is a general history non-fiction book written by Australian historian Geoffrey Blainey. First published in 2000 by Penguin Books, it describes over 4 million years of history, from before the first people left Africa, through to the current day.

In 2007 Blainey released an abridged (492 pages) paperback version of the book titled A Very Short History of the World. He also released a double audio CD set of the same name.

== Other books of the same title ==
A book of the same title was written by H. G. Wells in 1920.

British historian John Roberts published A Short History of the World in 1997, as a follow-up to his larger 1994 book History of the World.
