= A Short History of the World (Wells book) =

Book by Herbert George Wells

- 1st edition (1922), Cassell & Company
- Author: H. G. Wells
- Subject: General history
- Publisher: Cassell & Company (London), The Macmillan Company (New York)
- Publication date: 1922
- Pages: 432 (Cassell), 455 (Macmillan)
- OCLC: 3499379
- Text: A Short History of the World at Wikisource

A Short History of the World is an account of human history by English author H. G. Wells. It was first published in 1922 by Cassell & Company (London) and The Macmillan Company (New York). The book was preceded by Wells's fuller 1919 work The Outline of History, and was intended "to meet the needs of the busy general reader, too driven to study the maps and time charts of that Outline in detail, who wishes to refresh and repair his faded or fragmentary conceptions of the great adventure of mankind."

The first edition had around 400 pages, with about 200 illustrations, including 21 maps. Later editions were published with updated accounts of world events. It was published in Penguin Books in 1936, and republished under Penguin Classics in 2006.

The book summarises the scientific knowledge of the time regarding the history of Earth and life. It starts with its origins, goes on to explain the development of the Earth and life on Earth, reaching primitive thought and the development of humankind from the Cradle of Civilisation. The book ends with the outcome of the First World War, the Russian famine of 1921, and the League of Nations in 1922.

In 1934 Albert Einstein recommended the book for the study of history as a means of interpreting progress in civilisation.

== Censorship ==
The Spanish-language translation of A Short History of the World, discussing world events up to the late 1930s, was banned by the Francoist government in 1940. In two 1948 reports, Spanish censors gave a list of reasons for suppressing the book's publication. These were that the book "shows socialist inclinations, attacks the Catholic Church, gives a twisted interpretation of the Spanish Civil War and the Spanish National Movement, and contains 'tortuous concepts.'" As a result, A Short History was not published in Spain until 1963.

== See also ==
- The Story of Mankind
- A Little History of the World
