= The Story of Art =

1950 book by E. H. Gombrich

- First edition cover
- Author: E. H. Gombrich
- Language: English
- Genre: Non-fiction
- Publisher: Phaidon
- Publication date: 1950

The Story of Art, by E. H. Gombrich, is a survey of the history of art from ancient times to the modern era.

First published in 1950 by Phaidon, the book is widely regarded both as a seminal work of criticism and as one of the most accessible introductions to the visual arts. It was originally intended for younger readers. Over eight million copies have been sold, and it has been translated into more than 30 languages. As of 2022, The Story of Art is in its 16th edition.

== Background ==
The art historian Ernst Gombrich had experience with book production before The Story of Art; he collaborated with Ernst Kris on an unpublished book on the history of caricature and published his first book on the history of the world for children in 1936. That same year, Gombrich relocated to London from Vienna for a job synthesising the late Aby Warburg's notes for publication at the Warburg Institute. However, with the rise of the Second World War, Gombrich was sent to work as a broadcast translator at a BBC listening post in Evesham. There he met Béla Horovitz, founder of Phaidon Press, who was lacking materials to publish due to the war and was in search of new material.

The chapters in the 15th edition are listed as follows:

1. "Strange beginnings: Prehistoric and primitive peoples; Ancient America"
2. "Art for eternity: Egypt, Mesopotamia, Crete"
3. "The great awakening: Greece, seventh to fifth century BC"
4. "The realm of beauty: Greece and the Greek world, fourth century BC to first century AD"
5. "World conquerors: Romans, Buddhists, Jews and Christians, first to fourth century AD"
6. "A parting of ways: Rome and Byzantium, fifth to thirteenth century"
7. "Looking eastwards: Islam, China, second to thirteenth century"
8. "Western art in the melting pot: Europe, sixth to eleventh century"
9. "The Church militant: The twelfth century"
10. "The Church triumphant: The thirteenth century"
11. "Courtiers and burghers: The fourteenth century"
12. "The conquest of reality: The early fifteenth century"
13. "Tradition and innovation: The later fifteenth century in Italy"
14. "Tradition and innovation: The fifteenth century in the North"
15. "Harmony attained: Tuscany and Rome, early sixteenth century"
16. "Light and colour: Venice and northern Italy, early sixteenth century"
17. "The new learning spreads: Germany and the Netherlands, early sixteenth century"
18. "A crisis of art: Europe, later sixteenth century"
19. "Vision and visions: Catholic Europe, first half of the seventeenth century"
20. "The mirror of nature: Holland, seventeenth century"
21. "Power and glory: Italy, later seventeenth and eighteenth centuries"
22. "Power and glory: France, Germany and Austria, late seventeenth and early eighteenth centuries"
23. "The age of reason: England and France, eighteenth century"
24. "The break in tradition: England, America, and France, late eighteenth and early nineteenth centuries"
25. "Permanent revolution: The nineteenth century"
26. "In search of new standards: The late nineteenth century"
27. "Experimental art: The first half of the twentieth century"
28. "A story without end: The triumph of Modernism / An altered mood / The changing past"

Each chapter discusses a selection of works from the defined period, and all of the works discussed are accompanied by illustrations. More than half of the book's pages are devoted to colour photographs of paintings, drawings, architecture and sculptures. In the preface, Gombrich explains that it has been his intention not to mention any work of art that he could not also include as an illustration.

== Style ==
The Story of Art is often described as a work that provides an accessible introduction to the subject of art history. The art historian T. S. R. Boase, writing in The Times Literary Supplement, observed that Gombrich "writes conversationally and intimately". Gombrich himself notes in the preface of the book that he intends to use "plain language" and to keep use of "the art historian's conventional terms" to a minimum.

== Reception ==
First published by Phaidon Press in 1950 and in its 16th edition as of 2022, The Story of Art has been a global bestseller with more than 8 million copies sold; it has been translated into more than 30 languages. It is included in Time magazine's list of 100 best nonfiction books of all time. The first two sentences of the book have become famous: "There really is no such thing as Art. There are only artists". Gombrich later elaborated on this statement by saying that he defines "art" based on its Latin root, meaning "skill", and that there is "no disembodied skill".

Upon its release, The Story of Art was noted for its pedagogical potential despite Gombrich's intentions of producing a pleasure read for teenagers. The artist and art history professor H. W. Janson, reviewing the book for College Art Journal, remarked that it was "undoubtedly destined for a most successful career in the classroom". He praised the book for its accessible language and selections free from Gombrich's own preferences, measuring the book against scholarly standards. In his discussion of the book in The Burlington Magazine, the artist and writer Wilfrid Blunt noted that The Story of Art reads like a lecture. Though he believed the lecture-like tone would lead masters to prefer the book rather than students, he declared that The Story of Art "fully deserve[s] a place in any educational library".

Criticism has also emerged since the book's release. One stream of criticism addresses Gombrich's treatment of contemporary art. In a 1989 review for Art Journal of the book’s 14th edition, the art history professor Bradford R. Collins criticised the work for its lack of depth in its discussion of contemporary art. Collins indicated that Gombrich's commentary on 20th-century art was brief and often dismissive. Elly Miller, daughter of Béla Horovitz, revealed in an interview that Gombrich had not originally intended to include an additional chapter on contemporary art and that "he really didn't come to terms with what he called modern art". The art curator Karen Wilkin made similar comments for The Hudson Review, remarking of The Story of Art that "[Gombrich] was never really at ease with anything but illusionistic painting and sculpture".

Gombrich's omission of non-Western and female artists has also been the subject of criticism, with no women having been included in the first The Story of Art and just one included in the 16th edition. With the intention of offsetting the emphasis on white, male, and Western works in Gombrich's globally influential book, the curator and art historian Katy Hessel responded to the lack of diverse representation by creating a book of works by a range of international female artists titled The Story of Art Without Men, published in 2022.
