= Ernst Gombrich =

Austrian-British art historian (1909–2001)

Sir Ernst Gombrich OM CBE FBA
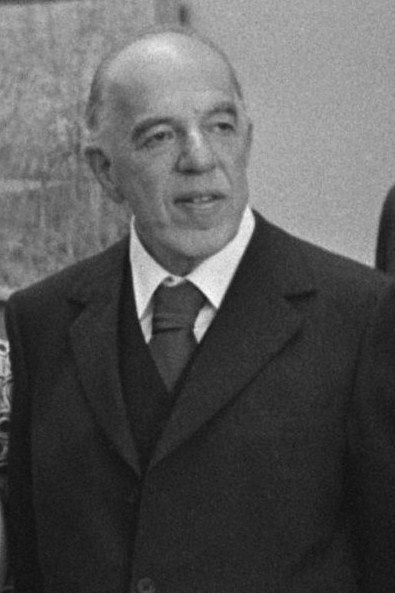
- Born: 30 March 1909; Vienna, Austria-Hungary
- Died: 3 November 2001 (aged 92); London, England
- Education: University of Vienna (PhD, 1933)
- Occupation: Art historian
- Notable work: The Story of Art

Sir Ernst Hans Josef Gombrich OM CBE FBA (/ˈɡɒmbrɪk/; German: [ˈgɔmbʁɪç]; 30 March 1909 – 3 November 2001) was an Austro-Hungarian born art historian. After settling in England in 1936, he became a naturalised British citizen in 1947 and spent most of his working life in the United Kingdom.

Ernst Gombrich was the author of many works of cultural history and art history, most notably The Story of Art, a book widely regarded as one of the most accessible introductions to the visual arts, and Art and Illusion, a major work in the psychology of perception that influenced thinkers as diverse as Carlo Ginzburg, Nelson Goodman, Umberto Eco, Thomas Kuhn and David Summers.

== Biography ==
The son of Karl Gombrich and Leonie Hock, Gombrich was born in Vienna, Austria-Hungary, into an upper middle class family of assimilated Jews who were part of a sophisticated social and musical milieu. His father was a lawyer and former classmate of Hugo von Hofmannsthal and his mother was a distinguished pianist who graduated from the Vienna Conservatoire with the School's Medal of Distinction.

At the Conservatoire Leonie Hock was a student of Anton Bruckner. Rather than pursuing a career as a concert pianist for personal reasons, she became the assistant of Theodor Leschetizky. She also knew Arnold Schoenberg, Gustav Mahler, Hugo Wolf and Johannes Brahms.Rudolf Serkin was a close family friend. Adolf Busch and members of the Busch Quartet regularly met and played in the family home. Throughout his life Gombrich maintained a deep love and knowledge of classical music. He was a competent cellist and in later life at home in London regularly played the chamber music of Haydn, Mozart, Schubert, Beethoven and others with his wife and his elder sister Dea Forsdyke, a concert violinist.

Gombrich was educated at the Theresianum and at the University of Vienna, where he studied art history under Hans Tietze, Karl Maria Swoboda, Julius von Schlosser and Josef Strzygowski, completing a PhD thesis on the Mannerist architecture of Giulio Romano, supervised by Schlosser. Specialised in caricature, he was invited to help Ernst Kris, who was then keeper of decorative arts at the Kunsthistorisches Museum, on his graduating in 1933.

In 1936, he married Ilse Heller (1910–2006), a pupil of his mother, and herself an accomplished pianist. Their only child, the Indologist Richard Gombrich, was born in 1937. They had two grandchildren: the educationalist Carl Gombrich, (b. 1965) and Leonie Gombrich (b. 1966), who is his literary executor.

After publishing his first book A Little History of the World in German in 1936, written for children and adolescents, and seeing it become a hit only to be banned by the Nazis for pacifism and attempts at discrediting the historicity of the accepted longevity-spans of both Italian and German societies, he fled to Britain in 1936 to take up a post as a research assistant at the Warburg Institute, University of London.

During World War II, Gombrich worked for the BBC World Service, monitoring German radio broadcasts. When in 1945 an upcoming announcement was prefaced by the Adagio of Bruckner's seventh symphony, written for Richard Wagner's death, Gombrich guessed correctly that Adolf Hitler was dead and promptly broke the news to Churchill.

Gombrich returned to the Warburg Institute in November 1945, where he became Senior Research Fellow (1946), Lecturer (1948), Reader (1954), and eventually Professor of the History of the Classical Tradition and director of the institute (1959–76). He was elected a Fellow of the British Academy in 1960, appointed Commander of the Order of the British Empire (CBE) in the 1966 New Year Honours, knighted in the 1972 Birthday Honours, and appointed a member of the Order of Merit in 1988. He continued his work at the University of London until close to his death in 2001. He was the recipient of numerous additional honours, including Goethe Prize 1994 and Balzan Prize in 1985 for History of Western Art.

Gombrich was close to a number of Austrian émigrés who fled to the West prior to the Anschluss, among them Karl Popper (to whom he was especially close), Friedrich Hayek and Max Perutz. He was instrumental in bringing to publication Popper's magnum opus The Open Society and Its Enemies. Each had known the other only fleetingly in Vienna, as Gombrich's father served his law apprenticeship with Popper's father. They became lifelong friends in exile.

== Work ==
Gombrich remarked that he had two very different publics: amongst scholars he was known particularly for his work on the Renaissance and the psychology of perception, but also his thoughts on cultural history and tradition; to a wider, non-specialist audience he was known for the accessibility and immediacy of his writing and his ability to present scholarly work in a clear and unfussy manner.

Gombrich's first book, and the only one he did not write in English, was Eine kurze Weltgeschichte für junge Leser ("A short history of the world for young readers"), published in Germany in 1936. It was very popular and translated into several languages, but was not available in English until 2005, when a translation of a revised edition was published as A Little History of the World. He did most of this translation and revision himself, and it was completed by his long-time assistant and secretary Caroline Mustill and his granddaughter Leonie Gombrich after his death.

The Story of Art, first published in 1950 and currently in its 16th edition, is widely regarded as one of the most accessible introductions to the history of visual arts. Originally intended for adolescent readers, it has sold millions of copies and been translated into more than 30 languages.

He became the director of the Warburg Institute in 1959, holding that position until 1976–making his tenure as director the longest-standing in the institution’s history.

The following year he published Art and Illusion (1960), regarded by critics to be his most influential and far-reaching work. Shortly thereafter a group of Gombrich’s essays were gathered for his anthology Meditations on a Hobby Horse (1963).

Other important books are Aby Warburg: An Intellectual Biography (1970), The Sense of Order (1979), The Image and the Eye (1981), and The Preference for the Primitive (posthumously in 2002). The complete list of his publications, E. H. Gombrich: A Bibliography, was published by Joseph Burney Trapp in 2000.

== Thought ==
=== Psychology of perception ===
When Gombrich arrived in England in 1936, the discipline of art history was largely centred around connoisseurship. Gombrich, however, had been brought up in the Viennese culture of Bildung and was concerned with wider issues of cultural tradition and the relationship between science and art. This latter breadth of interest can be seen both in his working relationship with the Austrian psychoanalyst and art historian, Ernst Kris, concerning the art of caricature and his later books, The Sense of Order (1979) (in which information theory is discussed in its relation to patterns and ornaments in art) and the classic Art and Illusion (1960).

It was in Art and Illusion that he introduced the ideas of 'schemata', 'making and matching', 'correction' and 'trial and error' influenced by 'conjecture and refutation', in Popper's philosophy of science. In Gombrich's view, the artist compares what he has drawn or painted with what he is trying to draw/paint, and by a 'feedback loop' gradually corrects the drawing/painting to look more like what he is seeing. The process does not start from scratch, however. Each artist inherits '"schemata" that designate reality by force of convention'. These schemata, plus the techniques and works of previous masters, are the starting points from which the artist begins her own process of trial and error.

"This [Popperian description of conjecture and refutation, trial and error] is eminently applicable to the story of visual discoveries in art. Our formula of schema and correction, in fact, illustrates this very procedure. You must have a starting point, a standard of comparison, to begin that process of making and matching and remaking which finally becomes embodied in the finished image. The artist cannot start from scratch, but he can criticise his forerunners"

The philosophical conceptions developed by Popper for a philosophy of science meshed well with Gombrich's ideas for a more robust explanation of the history of art. Gombrich had written his first major work The Story of Art in 1950, ten years before Art and Illusion. The earlier book has been described as viewing the history of art as a narrative moving 'from what ancient artists "knew" to what later artists "saw"'. And as Gombrich was always more concerned with the individual rather than mass movements (the famous first line of The Story of Art is 'There really is no such thing as Art. There are only artists'), he saw the use of scientific and psychological explanations as key to understanding how these individual artists 'saw', and how they built upon the traditions they had inherited and of which they were a part. With the dialectics of making and matching, schema and correction, Gombrich sought to ground artistic development on more universal truths, closer to those of science, than on what he regarded as fashionable or vacuous terms such as 'zeitgeist' and other 'abstractions'.

=== Renaissance studies ===
Gombrich's contribution to the study of Renaissance art began with his doctoral dissertation on mannerism. In this he argues that the work of Giulio Romano, at the Palazzo del Tè, was not the work of a decadent Renaissance artist but rather showed how the painter responded to the demands of a patron 'eager for fashionable novelty'.

The four-volume series Studies in the Art of the Renaissance (1966) comprises the volumes Norm and Form; Symbolic Images; The Heritage of Apelles; and New Light on Old Masters, and made a major contribution to the study of symbolism in the work of this period.

Gombrich was a great admirer of Leonardo da Vinci and wrote extensively on him, both in these volumes and elsewhere.

== Influence ==
Gombrich has been called 'the best known art historian in Britain, perhaps in the world' and also 'one of the most influential scholars and thinkers of the 20th century'.

In October 2014 an English Heritage blue plaque for Gombrich was unveiled by sculptor Antony Gormley at 19 Briardale Gardens, Hampstead, alongside Sir Peter Bazalgette, chair of the Arts Council and blue plaque panel member, Richard Gombrich and the art historian Prof David Freedberg. The plaque reads: "E. H. Gombrich (1909 – 2001) Art Historian lived here 1952 to 2001." Gormley lived as a child a couple of doors down from the house.

== Criticism ==
Gombrich was sensitive to the criticism that he did not like modern art and was obliged to defend his position on occasion. He has also been criticised for taking what is now viewed as a eurocentric—not to say neo-colonialist—view of art, and for not including female artists in much of his writing on Western art. His answer to the latter was that he was writing a history of art as it was, and that women artists did not feature widely in the West before the 20th century. He admired 20th-century female artists such as Bridget Riley, whose work was included in a revised edition of The Story of Art.

While several works of Gombrich (especially Art and Illusion in 1960) had enormous impact on art history and other fields, his categorical attacks on historism have been accused (by Carlo Ginzburg) of leading to "barren" scholarship; many of his methodological arguments have been superseded by the work of art historians like Svetlana Alpers and his own student Michael Baxandall.

== Honours and awards ==
- Master-Mind Lecture of the British Academy (1957)
- Elected to the American Academy of Arts and Sciences (1964)
- Commander of the Order of the British Empire (1966)
- Elected to the American Philosophical Society (1968)
- Knight Bachelor (1972)
- Austrian Cross of Honour for Science and Art, 1st class (1975)
- Hegel Prize (1976)
- Pour le Mérite for Sciences and Arts (1977)
- Order of Merit (1988)
- Balzan Prize for History of Art of the West (1985)
- Goethe Prize (1994)
- City of Vienna Prize for Humanities (1986)
- Ludwig Wittgenstein Prize of the Austrian Science Foundation (1988)
- honorary doctorate from the University of Vienna (1999)
- Leverhulme Medal of the British Academy (2002)
- In the Favoriten (10th District) of Vienna, the Gombrichgasse was named for him in 2009.

== Selected publications ==
- The Preference for the Primitive. Episodes in the History of Western Taste and Art. London: Phaidon 2002
- The Uses of Images. Studies in the Social Function of Art and Visual Communication. London: Phaidon 1999
- Topics of Our Time. Twentieth-Century Issues in Learning and in Art. London: Phaidon. 1991. ISBN 978-0-520-07516-0 – via Internet Archive.
- Woodfield, Richard, ed. (1987). Reflections on the History of Art: Views and Reviews. Oxford: Phaidon. ISBN 978-0-520-06189-7 – via Internet Archive.
- Tributes. Interpreters of our Cultural Tradition. Oxford: Phaidon. 1984. ISBN 978-0-8014-1703-0 – via Internet Archive.
- Ideals & Idols. Essays on Values in History and Art. Oxford: Phaidon 1979
- The Sense of Order. a Study in the Psychology of Decorative Art. Oxford: Phaidon 1979
- Aby Warburg, an Intellectual Biography. London: The Warburg Institute 1970
- The Image and the Eye: Further Studies in the Psychology of Pictorial Representation. Oxford: Phaidon 1982, ISBN 0-7148-2245-0
- Studies in the Art of the Renaissance. London: Phaidon 1967–1986 (also published as: Gombrich on the Renaissance.)
  - 1: Norm and Form. 1967
  - 2: Symbolic Images. 1972
  - 3: The Heritage of Apelles. 1976
  - 4: New Light on Old Masters. 1986 – via Internet Archive.
- In Search of Cultural History: The Philip Maurice Deneke Lecture 1967. Oxford: Clarendon Press. 1969. ISBN 978-0-19-817168-3 – via Internet Archive.
- Meditations on a Hobbyhorse and other Essays on the Theory of Art. London: Phaidon 1963
- Art and Illusion. A Study in the Psychology of Pictorial Representation London: Phaidon 1960
- The Story of Art. London: Phaidon 1950
- Weltgeschichte von der Urzeit bis zur Gegenwart. Wenen: s.n. 1935 (also published as: Eine kurze Weltgeschichte für junge Leser. Von der Urzeit bis zur Gegenwart.) English translation: A Little History of the World.
