= A Little History of the World =

1935/2005 book by Ernst Gombrich

- Author: Ernst Gombrich
- Original title: Eine kurze Weltgeschichte für junge Leser
- Language: German
- Genre: History
- Publisher: Yale University Press (2005)
- Publication date: 1935
- Publication place: Austria
- English publication date: 2005

A Little History of the World (originally in German, Eine kurze Weltgeschichte für junge Leser) is a history book by Ernst Gombrich. It was written in 1935 in Vienna, Austria, when Gombrich was 26 years old. He was rewriting it for English readers when he died in 2001, at the age of 92, in London. Gombrich insisted that only he translate the book into English. After his death, the translation was completed, according to his wishes, by Caroline Mustill, an assistant to Gombrich from 1995 until his death, and his granddaughter Leonie Gombrich. It was published in 2005 by Yale University Press.

== Short history ==
The short history chronicles human development from the inventions of cavemen to the results of the First World War. Additionally, the book describes the beliefs of many major world religions, including Judaism, Hinduism, Buddhism, Christianity, and Islam, and incorporates these ideas into its narrative presentation of historical people and events.

Leonie Gombrich explains in the introduction to the English-language edition that Gombrich, writing the last phases of his doctoral thesis, had corresponded with the young daughter of some friends, who wanted to know what he was spending all of his time on at work. It was a great pleasure for Gombrich to explain his doctoral work to the girl, using only words and concepts that children could understand. Convinced that an intelligent child could understand even seemingly complicated ideas in history, if they were put into intelligible terms, Gombrich composed a sample chapter on the "Ritterzeit" (Time of the Knights) and sent it to the publisher Walter Neurath. Excited about the text, but somewhat pressed for time, Neurath asked Gombrich to produce a complete script in six weeks, so that the book could be printed. Unsure of his ability to satisfy such a demand, Gombrich, after some convincing, promised to try. He set himself to the task of writing a chapter a day (with the exception of Sundays, when he would read his work to Ilse Heller, later his wife). He spent his mornings and afternoons reading in his home and at the library and reserved his evenings for composition. He chose his themes based on what seemed to him to be the most influential events in history from a modern perspective, and based upon what remains best remembered. Somewhat miraculously, he delivered the text on time, and the book appeared to the public in 1936.

Later, the book was banned during the National Socialist (Nazi) regime for being too pacifistic.

Gombrich's goal in the book is summarized in his following words, which appear in the foreword to the book's Turkish edition:

I would like to emphasize that this book isn't thought of and wasn't ever thought of as a replacement for history books used in schools, which serve an entirely different purpose. I would like for my readers to relax and to follow history without having to take notes of names and dates. I promise too, that I won't ask you for them.

== Reviews ==
Anthony Grafton, in The Wall Street Journal, reviewed Gombrich's book: "Lucky children will have this book read to them. Intelligent adults will read it for themselves and regain contact with the spirit of European humanism at its best."

The Guardian said, "Gombrich opens with the most magical definition of history I have ever read ... Tolerance, reason and humanity ... suffuse every page of the Little History."

According to The Times, "With Gombrich’s Little History at last available in English there will be many generations of future historians who will attribute to it their lifelong passion for history – and for truth."

Robert Hanks, writing for The Daily Telegraph said that the book was, "A marvellous antidote to history without chronology: the whole experience of human history, from prehistory to the Second World War, compressed into a flowing narrative... [Gombrich] excels in creating a sense of the continuities of history – the ways in which human nature has not budged over the millenium, and the smallness of the differences between people. A delight."

== Chapter Names and Titles ==
1. Once Upon a Time
2. The Greatest Inventors of All Time
3. The Land by the Nile
4. Sunday, Monday
5. The One and Only God
6. I C-A-N R-E-A-D
7. Heroes and Their Weapons
8. An Unequal Struggle
9. Two Small Cities in One Small Land
10. The Enlightened One and His Land
11. A Great Teacher of a Great People
12. The Greatest Adventure of All
13. New Wars and New Warriors
14. An Enemy of History
15. Rulers of the Western World
16. The Good News
17. Life in the Empire and at its Frontiers
18. The Storm
19. The Starry Night Begins
20. There is No God but Allah, and Muhammad is His Prophet
21. A Conqueror who Knows how to Rule
22. A Struggle to Become Lord of Christendom
23. Chivalrous Knights
24. Emperors in the Age of Chivalry
25. Cities and Citizens
26. A New Age
27. A New World
28. A New Faith
29. The Church at War
30. Terrible Times
31. An Unlucky King and a Lucky King
32. Meanwhile, Looking Eastwards...
33. A Truly New Age
34. A Very Violent Revolution
35. The Last Conqueror
36. Men and Machines
37. Across the Seas
38. Two New States in Europe
39. Dividing Up the World
40. The Small Part of the History of the World Which I Have Lived Through Myself: Looking Back

== Editions ==
- Gombrich, Ernst H. Eine Kurze Weltgeschichte für junge Leser. Dumont. Germany, 2005.
- Gombrich, Ernst H. A Little History of the World. Yale. UK and USA, 2005. ISBN 978-0300108835
  - with Clifford Harper (illustrator). Paperback, 2008. ISBN 030014332X
