= Australian history wars =

Public debate in Australia over British colonialism

The history wars is a term used in Australia to describe the public debate about the interpretation of the history of the European colonisation of Australia and the development of contemporary Australian society, particularly with regard to their impact on Aboriginal Australian and Torres Strait Islander peoples. The term "history wars" emerged in the late 1990s during the term of the Howard government, and despite efforts by some of Howard's successors, the debate is ongoing, notably reignited in 2016 and 2020.

The "history wars" are often regarded as a culture war and have involved key figures in the Australian political and media landscapes. The term largely refers to the extent to which the history of European colonisation post-1788 and government administration since federation in 1901 may be characterised as having been:

- a relatively minor conflict between European settlers and Indigenous Australians, and generally lacking in events that might be termed "invasion", "warfare", "guerrilla warfare", "conquest" or "genocide", and generally marked instead by humane intent by government authorities, with damage to Indigenous Australians largely attributable to unintended factors (such as the unintentional spread of infectious diseases from Europe) rather than to malicious policies; or
- an invasion marked by violent frontier conflicts and guerrilla warfare between European settlers and Indigenous Australians involving numerous clashes between Aboriginal people and the new settlers as a result of the former's food gathering practices being at odds with new land-use practices based on agriculture and capitalism, a situation which has been argued to have evolved into a pan-Australian "genocide of Indigenous Australians", which continues to affect Aboriginal people today.

The history wars also relates to broader themes concerning national identity, as well as methodological questions concerning the historian and the craft of researching and writing history, including issues such as the value and reliability of written records (of the authorities and settlers) and the oral tradition (of the Indigenous Australians), along with the political or similar ideological biases of those who interpret them. One theme is how British or multicultural Australian identity has been in history and today. At the same time the history wars were in play, professional history seemed in decline, and popular writers began reclaiming the field.

== Outline ==
The term "history wars" refers to an ideological conflict over how to perceive Australia as a nation, framed largely by the respective visions of Labor Party Prime Minister Paul Keating (1991–1996), who saw race relations as central to the nation's character and who gave new attention to Indigenous people's issues, and Liberal Prime Minister John Howard (1996–2007), who sought to establish a new conservative view of Australia that valorised the nation's achievements and was grounded in "Judeo-Christian ethics, the progressive spirit of the enlightenment and the institutions and values of British culture".

The conflict was played out largely in the popular media, books, and think-tank lectures. Commentators on the political left argued that Australia's national identity was linked to its treatment of Indigenous people and advocated making amends for past injustices on moral grounds, while those on the political right argued that the left had exaggerated the harms done to Indigenous Australians, that stories of abuses of Indigenous people were undermining Australia's coherent identity, and that contemporary Australians did not feel responsible for abuses committed in the past. Much of the public controversy was related to the release of the government's report on the Stolen Generations commissioned by Keating but released after Howard took office, titled Bringing Them Home.

In 1968 Professor W. E. H. "Bill" Stanner, an Australian anthropologist, coined the term the "Great Australian Silence" in a Boyer Lecture titled "After the Dreaming", where he argued that the writing of Australian history was incomplete. He asserted that Australian national history as documented up to that point had largely been presented in a positive light, but that Indigenous Australians had been virtually ignored. He saw this as a structural and deliberate process to omit "several hundred thousand Aboriginal people who lived and died between 1788 and 1938 ... (who were but) ... negative facts of history and ... were in no way consequential for the modern period". A new strand of Australian historiography subsequently emerged which gave much greater attention to the negative experiences of Indigenous Australians during the British settlement of Australia.

In the 1970s and 1980s, historians such as Manning Clark and Henry Reynolds published work which they saw as correcting selective historiography that had misrepresented or ignored Indigenous Australian history. The historian Geoffrey Blainey argued in the literary and political journal Quadrant in 1993 that the telling of Australian history had moved from an unduly positive rendition (the "Three Cheers View") to an unduly negative view (the "black armband") and Australian commentators and politicians have continued to debate this subject.

Interpretations of Aboriginal history became part of the wider political debate sometimes called the 'culture wars' during the tenure of the Coalition government from 1996 to 2007, with Prime Minister of Australia John Howard publicly championing the views of some of those associated with Quadrant. This debate extended into a controversy over the way history was presented in the National Museum of Australia and in high school history curricula. It also migrated into the general Australian media, with regular opinion pieces being published in major broadsheets such as The Australian, The Sydney Morning Herald and The Age. Marcia Langton has referred to much of this wider debate as "war porn" and an "intellectual dead end".

Two Australian prime ministers, Paul Keating and John Howard, were major participants in the "wars". According to the analysis for the Australian Parliamentary Library of Dr Mark McKenna, Howard believed that Keating portrayed Australia pre-Whitlam in an unduly negative light; while Keating sought to distance the modern Labor movement from its historical support for the Monarchy and the White Australia policy by arguing that it was the Conservative Australian parties who had been barriers to national progress and excessively loyal to the British Empire. He accused Britain of having abandoned Australia during World War II. Keating was a staunch advocate of a symbolic apology to indigenous people for the misdeeds of past governments, and outlined his view of the origins and potential solutions to contemporary Aboriginal disadvantage in his Redfern Park Speech (drafted with the assistance of historian Don Watson). In the aftermath of the 1997 Bringing Them Home report and the ensuing debate, which was highly acrimonious, Howard in 1999 passed a Parliamentary Motion of Reconciliation describing treatment of Aboriginal people as the "most blemished chapter" in Australian history, but he did not make a Parliamentary apology. Howard argued that an apology was inappropriate as it would imply "intergeneration guilt" and said that "practical" measures were a better response to contemporary Aboriginal disadvantage. Keating has argued for the eradication of remaining symbols linked to British origins: including deference for ANZAC Day, the Australian flag and the Monarchy in Australia, while Howard was a supporter of these institutions. Unlike fellow Labor leaders and contemporaries, Bob Hawke and Kim Beazley, Keating never traveled to Gallipoli for ANZAC Day ceremonies. In 2008 he described those who gathered there as "misguided".

In 2006, John Howard said in a speech to mark the 50th anniversary of Quadrant that "political correctness" was dead in Australia but: "we should not underestimate the degree to which the soft-left still holds sway, even dominance, especially in Australia's universities"; and in 2006, The Sydney Morning Herald political editor Peter Hartcher reported that Opposition foreign affairs spokesman Kevin Rudd was entering the philosophical debate by arguing in response that "John Howard, is guilty of perpetrating 'a fraud' in his so-called culture wars ... designed not to make real change but to mask the damage inflicted by the Government's economic policies".

The defeat of the Howard government in the Australian Federal election of 2007, and its replacement by the Rudd Labor government altered the dynamic of the debate. Rudd made an official apology to the Stolen Generation with bipartisan support. Like Keating, Rudd supported an Australian Republic, but in contrast to Keating, Rudd declared support for the Australian flag and supported the commemoration of ANZAC Day and expressed admiration for Liberal Party founder Robert Menzies.

Following the change of government and the passage, with support from all parties, of a Parliamentary apology to indigenous Australians, Professor of Australian Studies Richard Nile argued: "the culture and history wars are over and with them should also go the adversarial nature of intellectual debate", a view contested by others, including conservative commentator Janet Albrechtsen. However, an intention to re-engage in the history wars was indicated by then-Federal Opposition member Christopher Pyne.

=== History wars and culture wars ===
The "history wars" are widely viewed, by external observers and participants on both sides as similar to the "culture war" underway in the United States. William D. Rubinstein, writing for the conservative British think tank known as the Social Affairs Unit, refers to the history wars as "the Culture War down under". Participants in the debate including Keith Windschuttle and Robert Manne are frequently described as "culture warriors" for their respective points of view.

== Topics ==
=== Black armband / white blindfold debate ===
The "black armband" debate concerns whether or not accounts of Australian history gravitate towards an overly negative or an overly positive point of view. The black armband view of history was a phrase first used by Australian historian Geoffrey Blainey in his 1993 Sir John Latham Memorial Lecture to describe views of history which, he believed, posited that "much of [pre-multicultural] Australian history had been a disgrace" and focused mainly on the treatment of minority groups (especially Aboriginal people). He contrasted this with the Three Cheers view, according to which "nearly everything that came after [the convict era] was believed to be pretty good". Blainey argued that both such accounts of Australian history were inaccurate, saying: "The Black Armband view of history might well represent the swing of the pendulum from a position that had been too favourable, too self-congratulatory, to an opposite extreme that is even more unreal and decidedly jaundiced."

The lecture was subsequently published in the political and literary journal, Quadrant, which at the time was edited by academic and political scientist Robert Manne and later by writer and historian Keith Windschuttle, two of the leading "history warriors", albeit on opposing sides of the debate. The phrase then began to be used by some commentators pejoratively to describe historians viewed as writing excessively critical Australian history "while wearing a black armband" of "mourning and grieving, or shame". New interpretations of Australia's history since 1788 were contested for focussing almost exclusively on official and unofficial imperialism, exploitation, ill-treatment, colonial dispossession and cultural genocide and ignoring positive aspects of Australia's history. Historian Manning Clark, author of the best-known history of Australia, was named by Blainey in his 1993 speech as having "done much to spread the gloomy view and also the compassionate view with his powerful prose and Old Testament phrases".

The Howard government's responses to the question of how to recount Australian history were initially formulated in the context of former Labor prime minister Paul Keating's characterisation of the subject. John Howard argued in a 1996 Sir Robert Menzies Lecture that the "balance sheet of Australian history" had come to be misrepresented:

The 'black armband' view of our history reflects a belief that most Australian history since 1788 has been little more than a disgraceful story of imperialism, exploitation, racism, sexism and other forms of discrimination. ... I believe that the balance sheet of our history is one of heroic achievement and that we have achieved much more as a nation of which we can be proud than of which we should be ashamed. In saying that I do not exclude or ignore specific aspects of our past where we are rightly held to account. Injustices were done in Australia and no-one should obscure or minimise them. ... But ... our priority should ... [be] to commit to a practical program of action that will remove the enduring legacies of disadvantage.

In 2009, Howard's successor Kevin Rudd also called for moving away from a black-arm view:

Time to leave behind us the polarisation that began to infect our every discussion of our nation's past. To go beyond the so-called "black arm" view that refused to confront some hard truths about our past, as if our forebears were all men and women of absolute nobility, without spot or blemish. But time, too, to go beyond the view that we should only celebrate the reformers, the renegades and revolutionaries, thus neglecting or even deriding the great stories of our explorers, of our pioneers, and of our entrepreneurs. Any truthful reflection of our nation's past is that these are all part of the rich fabric of our remarkable story ...

Stephen Muecke, Professor of Ethnography at the University of New South Wales, contributed to the debate by arguing that black armband events bring people together in common remembrance and cited Anzac Day as an example; while Aboriginal lawyer Noel Pearson argued that whilst there was much that is worth preserving in the cultural heritage of non-Aboriginal Australia, "To say that ordinary Australians who are part of the national community today do not have any connection with the shameful aspects of our past is at odds with our exhortations that they have connections to the prideful bits".

The notion of the white blindfold view of history entered the debate as a pejorative counter-response to the notion of the "black armband school".

In his book Why Weren't We Told? in 1999, Henry Reynolds referred to Stanner's "Great Australian Silence", and to "a 'mental block' which prevented Australians from coming to terms with the past". He argued that the silence about Australia's history of frontier violence in much of the twentieth century stands in stark contrast with the openness with which violence was admitted and discussed in the nineteenth. Reynolds quotes many excerpts from the press, including an article in the Townsville Herald in Queensland written as late as 1907, by a "pioneer" who described his part in a massacre. Reynolds commented that violence against Aboriginals, far from being hushed up or denied, was openly talked about.

The nature of the debate began to change in 1999 with the publication of a book Massacre Myth by journalist Rod Moran, who examined the 1926 Forrest River massacre in Western Australia. Moran concluded that the massacre was a myth inspired by the false claims of a missionary (possibly as a result of mental health issues). The principal historian of the Forrest River massacre, Neville Green, describes the massacre as probable but not able to be proven in court. Windschuttle said that reviewing Moran's book inspired his own examination of the wider historical record. Windschuttle argues that much of Australian Aboriginal history, particularly as written since the late 1970s, was based on the use of questionable or unreliable evidence and on deliberate misrepresentation and fabrication of historical evidence. He based his conclusions on his examination of the evidence cited in previous historical accounts and reported incidences of non-existent documents being cited, misquoting and misleadingly selective quoting from documents and of documents being cited as evidence that certain events took place when his examination concluded that they do not support those claims. Windschuttle reported his conclusions in a number of articles published in Quadrant and in 2002, he published a book, The Fabrication of Aboriginal History, Volume 1, Van Diemen's Land 1803–1847, which focussed on Tasmanian colonial history.

Blainey argued in a 2003 book review of Fabrication, that the number of instances where source documents do not support the claims made, and the fact that the divergences overwhelmingly tend to purport claims of violent conflict and massacres, indicate that this is not a matter of mere error but bias.

The debate had therefore changed from an argument over whether there was an excessive focus on negative aspects of Australian history to one over to what extent, if at all, Australian Aboriginal history had been based on questionable evidence or had been falsified or fabricated and whether this had exaggerated the extent of violence against Indigenous Australians. Particular historians and histories that are challenged include Lyndall Ryan and Henry Reynolds and the histories of massacres, particularly in Tasmania but also elsewhere in Australia. Windschuttle's naming of historians whom he accused of misrepresentation and fabrication of the historical evidence, created considerable controversy and produced a range of responses including condemnation of as well as support for his work.

=== Genocide debate ===
The case for using the term "Australian genocide" rests on evidence from various sources that people argue proves some form of genocide. People cite the list of massacres of Indigenous Australians by British settlers, mainly in the 19th century.

Others have pointed to the dramatic reduction in the Tasmanian Aboriginal population in the 19th century and the forced removal of generations of Aboriginal children from their parents during the 20th century as evidence of genocide. The evidence includes documentation of the wish, and sometimes intention, of a significant proportion of late 19th-century and early 20th-century white Australians to see the Aboriginal "race" eliminated. Documents include published letters to the editors of high-circulation newspapers. Certainly this was the case in Queensland, in terms of Indigenous people the most populated section of Australia and certainly the colony with the most violent frontier. In June 1866 Sir Robert Herbert summing up his experience after six and a half years as the first Premier of this colony wrote:

Every method of dealing with these very dangerous savages has been tried, and I believe no more satisfactory system can be devised than that under which the people of Queensland endeavour to deal with a difficulty which it is feared can never terminate except with the gradual disappearance of the unimprovable race.

The "system", for which Herbert was among those personally responsible, was the "Native Police system" which allegedly went about "dispersing" any Indigenous groups thought to be a threat to law and order. This police force was poorly resourced, but used Aboriginal trackers to great effect when pursuing alleged criminals. An attempt to scientifically calculate the number of Indigenous Australians killed in encounters with the Native Police indicates that numbers may exceed 45,000.

The phrase "useless race" was expressed in Queensland, including in an 1877 editorial in The Queenslander (the weekly edition of the colony's main newspaper, the Brisbane Courier): "The desire for progressive advancement and substantial prosperity is, after all, stronger than sentimental dislike to the extinction of a savage and useless race". Classifying Indigenous Australians as a useless or unimprovable race was common. Debating the native police and the frontier in public in 1880 in the columns of The Queenslander, a prominent settler wrote: "And being a useless race, what does it matter what they suffer any more than the distinguished philanthropist who writes in this behalf cares for the wounded half-dead pigeon he tortures at his shooting matches?".

Remarks which were followed up in October of that years by Boyd Dunlop Morehead, one of the leading landholders, manager of the Scottish Australian Investment Co.'s Bowen Downs in 1866–81 and a future Premier, could be heard making the following acknowledgement in a parliamentary speech, saying, yes settlers in the past did go

... out, and in their pioneering had, of necessity, to use extreme measures to the inhabitants of the soil. The aboriginal, no doubt, had been shot down; no one denied it ... this race was being worked off the face of the earth. That that was so everyone knew, and that it must be so, none would deny ... For his own part he did not believe that the aboriginal race was worth preserving. If there were no aboriginals it would be a very good thing

After the introduction of the word "genocide" in the 1940s by Raphael Lemkin, Lemkin himself and most comparative scholars of genocide and many general historians, such as Robert Hughes, Ward Churchill, Leo Kuper and Jared Diamond, basing their analysis on previously published histories, present the extinction of the Tasmanian Indigenous Australians as a textbook example of a genocide. The Australian historian of genocide, Ben Kiernan, in his recent history of the concept and practice, Blood and soil: a world history of genocide and extermination from Sparta to Darfur (2007), treats the Australian evidence over the first century of colonisation as an example of genocide.

Among scholars specialising in Australian history much recent debate has focused on whether indeed what happened to groups of Indigenous people, and especially the Tasmanian Aboriginal people, during the European colonisation of Australia can be classified as genocide. According to Mark Levene, most Australian experts are now "considerably more circumspect". In the specific instance of the Tasmanian Indigenous Australians, Henry Reynolds, who takes events in other regions of colonial Australia as marked by "genocidal moments", argues that the records show that British administrative policy in Tasmania was explicitly concerned to avoid extermination. However, in practice, the activities of British people on the ground led to virtual extinction. Tony Barta, John Docker and Ann Curthoys however emphasize Lemkin's linkage between colonialism and genocide. Barta, an Australian expert in German history, argued from Lemkin that, "there is no dispute that the basic fact of Australian history is the appropriation of the continent by an invading people and the dispossession, with ruthless destructiveness, of another". Docker argues that, "we ignore Lemkin's wide-ranging definition of genocide, inherently linked with colonialism, at our peril". Curthoys argues that the separation between international and local Australian approaches has been deleterious. While calling for "a more robust exchange between genocide and Tasmanian historical scholarship", her own view is that the Tasmanian instance constitutes a "case for genocide, though not of state planning, mass killing, or extinction".

Much of the debate on whether European colonisation of Australia resulted in genocide, centres on whether "the term 'genocide' only applies to cases of deliberate mass killings of Aboriginal people by European settlers, or ... might also apply to instances in which many Aboriginal people were killed by the reckless or unintended actions and omissions of settlers". Historians such as Tony Barta argue that for the victim group it matters little if they were wiped out as part of a planned attack. If a group is decimated as a result of smallpox introduced to Australia by British settlers, or introduced European farming methods causing a group of Indigenous Australians to starve to death, the result is, in his opinion, genocide.

Henry Reynolds points out that European colonists and their descendants frequently use expressions that included "extermination", "extinction", and "extirpation" when discussing the treatment of Aboriginal people during the colonial period, and as in his opinion genocide "can take many forms, not all of them violent". Janine Roberts has argued that genocide was Australian policy, even if only by omission. She notes that despite contemporary newspapers regularly decrying "the barbarous crop of exterminators", and "a system of native slaughter ... merciless and complete", the government contended that "no illegal acts were occurring", with the worst incidents being described as merely "indiscretions".

The political scientist Kenneth Minogue and other historians such as Keith Windschuttle disagree and think that no genocide took place. Minogue does not try to define genocide but argues that its use is an extreme manifestation of the guilt felt by modern Australian society about the past misconduct of their society to Indigenous Australians. In his opinion its use reflects the process by which Australian society is trying to come to terms with its past wrongs and in doing this Australians are stretching the meaning of genocide to fit within this internal debate.

In the April 2008 edition of The Monthly, David Day wrote further on the topic of genocide. He wrote that Lemkin considered genocide to encompass more than mass killings but also acts like "driv[ing] the original inhabitants off the land ... confin[ing] them in reserves, where policies of deliberate neglect may be used to reduce their numbers ... Tak[ing] Indigenous children to absorb them within their own midst ... assimilation to detach the people from their culture, language and religion, and often their names."

=== Controversy over smallpox in Australia ===
The arrival of smallpox in Australia is of uncertain origin and is a major theme in the history wars. The lack of immunity among Aboriginal Australians to introduced diseases saw smallpox or some related disease inflict a devastating toll in 1789 upon the Aboriginal population near Sydney. This outbreak has been the most discussed of the introduced diseases that destroyed much of the Aboriginal population in the decades after British settlement of Australia began in 1788. Such diseases may have prevented Indigenous Australians from offering serious resistance to the British colonists; and also sometimes gave later colonists the illusion of entering an empty or unowned land.

Unlike other major diseases, which produced fairly steady mortality, smallpox occurred during the colonial period in three major outbreaks, at longish intervals. Smallpox was first recorded by British observers in April 1789 some 16 months after the First Fleet had arrived, then again four decades later in 1830, and then in an extended outbreak in the 1860s which seems to have begun in Northern Australia, though it spread within some three years as far south as the Great Australian Bight. The historian Judy Campbell remarks, "between 1780 and 1870 smallpox itself was the major single cause of Aboriginal deaths. The consequences of Aboriginal smallpox are an integral part of modern Australian history."

As important as the severity of the first outbreak in 1789 was its timing. It came when the Eora people were still so numerous that some historians believe they might have been able to destroy the new British colony. Though venereal disease and possibly other diseases struck first, smallpox was the first disease that is recorded as seriously lowering the population of Indigenous Australians. Governor Arthur Phillip estimated that about half of the local Eora tribe had perished in some two or three months.

One possible explanation of the 1789 outbreak (that smallpox was deliberately introduced to Australia by the British as a form of germ warfare against the Indigenous Australians) would make it a central issue in the History Wars. Yet the nature and origin of the 1789 outbreak is far from clear. There is an unusual amount of disagreement, both between well-researched academic studies and also between the best secondary sources, extending even to whether the disease was truly smallpox.

Broadly, there are three alternative explanations, for which appropriate scholarly evidence has been offered, of the 1789 outbreak (and perhaps also of the two later outbreaks). The first is that the disease was smallpox (Variola major or Variola minor), which was already present in the islands of what is today Indonesia; that the smallpox was transferred to northern Australia by Macassan trepangers and traders around 1780, and that it was then spread, largely along Aboriginal trading routes, to the south of Australia.

The second is that the disease was not smallpox (which would normally have killed numerous Europeans) but chickenpox, a disease that rarely kills Europeans but can produce similar symptoms and create quite high mortality among populations that have no inherited immunity to it. In the case of the 1830 outbreak, there was active debate among the surgeons, at the time and for some decades after, as to whether the disease was smallpox or chickenpox.

The third explanation is that the disease was indeed smallpox, and that it was brought to south-eastern Australia by European ships, very likely by the British First Fleet, and was then transferred either accidentally or deliberately into the Aboriginal population.

All three explanations have their strong points, and their difficulties; and each has different implications for the History Wars debate. None of them necessarily frees the settlers from blame. A variant of the third scenario in which it is supposed that the British deliberately released smallpox near Sydney has become the favoured assumption on the radical Aboriginal website National Unity Government. and has been strongly promoted in recent years by the independent scholar Christopher Warren.

However, this theory has some problems to solve. First is the question as to why no European colonists caught smallpox in 1789 (although two non-Europeans living in the colony caught it and died). There is also the problem of explaining how the perpetrators could know in advance that this would be the case, unless they were indifferent to the harm they might do to their own people. (Colin Tatz in his 2011 Genocide in Australia: By Accident or Design? rejects as absurd the notion that the British would have wished to infect their new colony with a disease they dreaded.) A further problem is to explain how the colonists were able to infect Indigenous Australians with a disease that seems not to have existed among themselves. However, it has been argued that the practice of variolation provides a solution to this.

It is difficult to be certain how much the History Wars have influenced research into these theories. The issues involved certainly invite moral and political controversy, and may rouse partisan feelings. To believe that the success of the 1788 settlement in Sydney depended on an act of germ warfare would validate the intense sense of grievance felt by many Indigenous Australians. As well, many non-Indigenous Australians (especially on the Left of Australian politics) feel strongly that the injustices of the past now need to be fully and urgently recognised.

Yet others, especially on the Right, may be embarrassed or horrified by such a story, and may feel that the reputation of pioneering ancestors needs to be rescued from an unfortunate fashion for national self-denigration. For this group, the most congenial theory might be that smallpox, after reaching Northern Australia via Macassan traders in the 1780s moved inexorably on, mainly along Aboriginal trade routes, till it reached Sydney. They may also find the chickenpox theory acceptable, because, although it accepts that the First Fleet brought the epidemic, there would be no malice involved. (The chickenpox virus never leaves the body; so, it would have been carried to Australia unconsciously by colonists, some of whom later suffered a revival of the disease in the still-infectious form shingles.) Much the same would apply to theories that smallpox was accidentally released from the surgeons’ variolation jars.

The History Wars need not be the only fault-line in this debate. Professor John Carmody, for instance, has hinted that there may also be a "two cultures" fault-line at work between historians and medical scientists. Yet the History Wars element in the debate involves issues that are emotional for many Australians; and the “scanty data”, of which Frank Fenner complained leave large scope for scenarios that support a preferred view.

A fairly lengthy review of the “smallpox” debate by Robert Barnes in 2009 revealed (like Cumpston's extensive earlier review in 1914) how often historians (including Barnes himself) have hesitated between opposing viewpoints. Summing up the debate in 2021, the historian Peter Dowling wrote in 2021 that: "no one author or theory has in the end prevailed over the others. The question of the origin of the 1789 smallpox epidemic among the Australian Aboriginal people has remained unresolved."

Despite these uncertainties, the debate has been mainly a respectful and co-operative exchange between experts in differing disciplines, and it has occurred quite largely so far in academic publications rather than at media or tabloid level. Academics are not immune to ideologies or combativeness; but their professional work involves practicing (and teaching their students) methods of objective scholarly research. Hence, they are often wary of arousing passions or moralizing upon uncertain data. Some, like Carmody and Hunter, have warned explicitly that the History Wars may be a threat to impartial research.

Those, like Butlin and Warren, who believe that the 1789 disease was smallpox, and perhaps deliberately released, have argued temperately, sometimes suggesting that this might have been the work of rogue elements rather than of the surgeons or of Governor Phillip. Conversely, those like Carmody and Hunter who believe the disease was in fact chickenpox have taken pains to make clear that they are not thereby seeking to minimize the huge pain and devastation suffered by Indigenous Australians. An example is Barry Wright's 1988 statement, “I believe ... that an introduced epidemic of chickenpox not smallpox swept through the tribes, its effects every bit as deadly as if it had been smallpox.”

One of the few academics to strongly invoke the History Wars is the historian Craig Mear. In a 2008 article, whose main points he repeated in 2009 on Ockham’s Razor, Mear accused some fellow historians of being over-eager to believe the Macassan theory:

In 2002, author Judy Campbell promoted the Macassan theory in Invisible Invaders and her thesis was almost gratefully accepted by many historians. . . In her 2006 book, The Original Australians, archaeologist Dr Josephine Flood supported Campbell's thesis and described the idea that the British caused the smallpox epidemic as a 'myth'. In the context of the 'history wars', the claims and counter-claims about Australian history, at least we weren't at fault this time.

Mear then severely criticised Campbell's theories, claiming they were simply implausible because persons infected with smallpox are almost immediately incapacitated:

The idea that smallpox would spread via trade routes is untenable. Anyone suffering smallpox in its early stages was very unwell and unfit to travel any great distance. After eight to nine days, pustules appear on the body's extremities, making it unbearable to walk.

Mear appears to be saying that the incubation period for smallpox, that is, the time between being exposed to another sufferer and the (usually abrupt) appearance of symptoms, is very short. But medical textbooks seem to disagree, saying it averages some 10-12 or 10-14 days.

Mear's claims were subsequently criticised by H. A. Willis, who, writing in the rightwing magazine Quadrant, defended Judy Campbell's theory of overland transmission, and inverted the History Wars argument, claiming that "what keeps the European introduction idea going is the deep need of some members of our society for a foundation myth encapsulating a genocidal imperative in European settlement."

Most historians steer wide of such potentially ad hominem debates, which means that some of the moral issues relevant to the History Wars have not been fully argued through. Many would agree that the British, once they resolved to establish the Sydney settlement, had at the least a duty of care not to expose the Indigenous Australians to deadly diseases. Clearly their settlements did introduce these diseases, even if private whaling and sealing vessels from other nations may also have played a part.

Books like Jarrad Diamond's 1997 Guns, germs and steel or Krause and Trappe's 2019 A short history of humanity have created a widespread awareness of how diseases that were almost harmless to Europeans were often deadly to isolated peoples. Yet, at the time, this was less understood; and even the Germ theory of disease was not commonly accepted. Also, even if the British had fully understood the reasons why isolated populations are vulnerable, they had in the 1780s no certain way of knowing how thinly-populated Australia's inland regions were, and hence how isolated the southern Indigenous Australians might be. British awareness of selective vulnerability to disease may also have been derived as much from recent colonies in south and east Asia, where it was often the Europeans, not the native inhabitants, who died in huge numbers from unfamiliar diseases.

Even so, the British must have been aware that their ships would bring venereal and other diseases to the Indigenous Australians. Against that, these diseases, and most others, would likely have reached the Indigenous Australians in any case, with the increasing arrival of sealers and whalers of many nations to exploit the southern oceans. Some might also argue that if the British had not colonized Australia, other European nations would have done so, and hence the 1789 plague (and others) could at most have been delayed.

Not all such hypothetical arguments tend to exculpate the British. It is often said that the number of Indigenous Australians actually killed by British weapons was small or very small beside the number killed by diseases that the British fleets brought. However Governor Phillip's clear instructions were to take possession of the land for the British Crown; and the early governors made numerous grants to settlers and ex-convicts of the “crown land” so obtained, thus turning Aboriginal hunting grounds into farming and grazing properties. If this had always been their intention, then the British were in effect committed to whatever level of lethal violence was necessary to make the Indigenous Australians accept the loss of significant parts of their land. If, by accident, deaths from disease occurred first, and in such numbers as to leave little need for military violence, then it is possible to argue, as the historian Tony Barta does, that this accident merely spared the British the guilt of inflicting violence, not the guilt of intending it.

Such moral arguments resemble some of those that occur in the genocide debate in the History Wars. Some academics are wary of overemphasising the impact of diseases, for fear that the notion of unforeseeable epidemics may provide an easy way of excusing what happened to the Indigenous Australians—as if it was the “germs, not these imperialists themselves, […] that were chiefly responsible for sweeping aside the indigenes”. Against this, there are defenders of Governor Arthur Phillip’s administration who maintain that Phillip tried conscientiously to follow his orders to “live in amity and kindness with them [the Indigenous Australians]”. Some would also argue that his belief that Britain's literate culture, scientific technologies, and agricultural and administrative skills would create space, prosperity and an improved life for both races was not necessarily insincere, even if it was seriously misguided.

=== Stolen Generations debate ===
Despite the lengthy and detailed findings set out in the 1997 Bringing Them Home report into the Stolen Generation, which documented the removal of Aboriginal children from their families by Australian State and Federal government agencies and church missions, the nature and extent of the removals have been disputed within Australia, with some commentators questioning the findings contained in the report and asserting that the Stolen Generation has been exaggerated. Sir Ronald Wilson, former President of the Human Rights and Equal Opportunities Commission and a Commissioner on the Inquiry, has stated that none of the more than 500 witnesses who appeared before the Inquiry were cross-examined. This has been the basis of criticism by the Coalition Government and by the anthropologist Ron Brunton in a booklet published by the Institute of Public Affairs that was criticised in turn by the lawyer Hal Wootten. An Australian Federal Government submission has questioned the conduct of the Commission which produced the report, arguing that the Commission failed to critically appraise or test the claims on which it based the report and failed to distinguish between those separated from their families "with and without consent, and with and without good reason". Not only has the number of children removed from their parents been questioned, but also the intent and effects of the government policy.

Some critics, such as columnist and social commentator Andrew Bolt, have questioned the very existence of the Stolen Generation. Bolt stated that it is a "preposterous and obscene" myth and that there was actually no policy in any state or territory at any time for the systematic removal of "half-caste" Aboriginal children. Robert Manne responded that Bolt did not address the documentary evidence demonstrating the existence of the Stolen Generations and that this is a clear case of historical denialism. Bolt then challenged Manne to produce ten cases in which the evidence justified the claim that children were "stolen" as opposed to having been removed for reasons such as neglect, abuse, abandonment, etc. He argued that Manne did not respond and that this was an indication of unreliability of the claim that there was policy of systematic removal. In reply, Manne stated that he supplied a documented list of 250 names Bolt stated that prior to a debate, Manne provided him with a list of 12 names that he was able to show during the debate was "a list of people abandoned, saved from abuse or voluntarily given up by their parents"; and that during the actual debate, Manne produced a list of 250 names without any details or documentation as to their circumstances. Bolt also stated that he was subsequently able to identify and ascertain the history of some of those on the list and was unable to find a case where there was evidence to justify the term "stolen". He stated that one of the names on the list of allegedly stolen children was 13-year-old Dolly, taken into the care of the State after being "found seven months pregnant and penniless, working for nothing on a station".

The Bolt/Manne debate is a fair sample of the adversarial debating style in the area. There is focus on individual examples as evidence for or against the existence of a policy, and little or no analysis of other documentary evidence such as legislative databases showing how the legal basis for removal varied over time and between jurisdictions, or testimony from those who were called on to implement the policies, which was also recorded in the Bringing Them Home report. A recent review of legal cases claims it is difficult for Stolen Generation claimants to challenge what was written about their situation at the time of removal.

The report also identified instances of official misrepresentation and deception, such as when caring and able parents were incorrectly described by Aboriginal Protection Officers as not being able to properly provide for their children, or when parents were told by government officials that their children had died, even though this was not the case.

The new Australian Government elected in 2007 issued an apology similar to those that state governments had issued at or about the time of the Bringing Them Home report ten years earlier. On 13 February 2008, Kevin Rudd, prime minister of Australia, moved a formal apology in the House of Representatives, which was moved concurrently by the Leader of the Government in the Senate. It passed unanimously in the House of Representatives on 13 March 2008. In the Senate, the leader of the Australian Greens moved an amendment seeking to add compensation to the apology, which was defeated in a vote of 65 to 4, after which the motion was passed unanimously.

== Media ==
=== Windschuttle's The Fabrication of Aboriginal History ===
The historian Keith Windschuttle has disputed the historiography for the number of children in the Stolen Generations as well as the violence of European colonisation, arguing that left-wing scholars had exaggerated these events for their own political purposes.

Windschuttle's 2002 book, The Fabrication of Aboriginal History, Volume One: Van Diemen's Land 1803–1847, focuses on the Black War in Tasmania; he argues that there is credible evidence for the violent deaths of only 118 Tasmanian Indigenous Australians, as having been directly killed by the British, although there were undoubtedly an unquantifiable number of other deaths for which no evidence exists. He argues that the Tasmanian Aboriginal population was devastated by a lethal cocktail of introduced diseases to which they had little or no resistance due to their isolation from the mainland and the rest of humanity for thousands of years. The deaths and infertility caused by these introduced diseases, combined with the deaths from what violent conflict there was, rapidly decimated the relatively small Aboriginal population. Windschuttle also examined the nature of those violent episodes that did occur and concluded that there is no credible evidence of warfare over territory. Windschuttle argues that the primary source of conflict between the British and the Indigenous Australians was raids by Indigenous Australians, often involving violent attacks on settlers, to acquire goods (such as blankets, metal implements and 'exotic' foods) from the British. With this and with a detailed examination of footnotes in and evidence cited by the earlier historical works, he criticises the claims by historians such as Henry Reynolds and Professor Lyndall Ryan that there was a campaign of guerrilla warfare against British settlement. Particular historians and histories that are challenged include Henry Reynolds and the histories of massacres, particularly in Tasmania (such as in the Cape Grim massacre) but also elsewhere in Australia. Windschuttle's claims are based upon the argument that the 'orthodox' view of Australian history were founded on hearsay or the misleading use of evidence by historians.

Windschuttle argues that, in order to advance the 'deliberate genocide' argument, Reynolds has misused source documentation, including that from British colonist sources, by quoting out of context. In particular, he accuses Reynolds of selectively quoting from responses to an 1830 survey in Tasmania in that Reynolds quoted only from those responses that could be construed as advocating "extermination", "extinction", and "extirpation" and failed to mention other responses to the survey, which indicated that a majority of respondents rejected genocide, were sympathetic to the plight of the Aboriginal people, feared that conflict arising from Aboriginal attacks upon settlers would result in the extinction of the Tasmanian Aboriginal people and advocated the adoption of courses of action to prevent this happening.

Windschuttle's claims and research have been disputed by some historians. In Whitewash: On Keith Windschuttle's Fabrication of Aboriginal History, an anthology including contributions from Henry Reynolds and Professor Lyndall Ryan, edited and introduced by Robert Manne, professor of politics at La Trobe University, Manne argues that Windschuttle's arguments are "unpersuasive and unsupported either by independent research or even familiarity with the relevant secondary historical literature". Other academics including Stephen Muecke, Marcia Langton, and Heather Goodall also expressed concerns about Windschuttle's work.

In "Contra Windschuttle", an article published in the conservative publication Quadrant, S.G. Foster examined some of the evidence that Windschuttle presented on one issue, Stanner's notion of the "Great Australian Silence". In Foster's opinion, the evidence produced by Windschuttle did not prove his case that the "Great Australian Silence" was largely a myth. Windschuttle argues that, in the years prior to Stanner's 1968 Boyer lecture, Australian historians had not been silent on the Aboriginal people although, in most cases, the historians' "discussions were not to Stanner's taste" and the Aboriginal people "might not have been treated in the way Reynolds and his colleagues would have liked". Foster argues that Windschuttle is "merciless with those who get their facts wrong" and that the fact that Windschuttle has also made a mistake means that he did not meet the criteria that he used to assess 'orthodox historians' he was arguing against and whom he accused of deliberately and extensively misrepresenting, misquoting, exaggerating and fabricating evidence relating to the level and nature of violent conflict between Aboriginal people and white settlers.

At the time of the publication of The Fabrication of Aboriginal History, Volume One it was announced that a second volume, to be published in 2003, would cover claims of frontier violence in New South Wales and Queensland, and a third, in 2004, would cover Western Australia. On 9 February 2008, however, it was announced that the second volume, anticipated to be published later in 2008, would be titled The Fabrication of Australian History, Volume 2: The "Stolen Generations" and would address the issue of the removal of Aboriginal children (the Stolen Generations) from their families in the 20th century.

The new volume was released in January 2010, now listed as Volume 3, with a statement that Volumes 2 and 4 would appear later. Announcing the publication, Windschuttle claimed that the film Rabbit-Proof Fence had misrepresented the child removal at the centre of the story, and offered inaccurate accounts of Molly's journey as it was recounted by her daughter, Doris Pilkington. These claims were subsequently rejected by the makers of the film. As of October 2021, Volumes 2 and 4 have not appeared.

=== Stuart Macintyre's The History Wars ===
In 2003, the Australian historians Stuart Macintyre and Anna Clark published The History Wars. This was a study of the background of, and arguments surrounding, recent developments in Australian historiography, and concluded that the History Wars had done damage to the nature of objective Australian history. At the launch of his book, historian Stuart Macintyre emphasised the political dimension of these arguments and said the Australian debate took its cue from the Enola Gay controversy in the United States. The book was launched by former prime minister Paul Keating, who took the opportunity to criticise conservative views of Australian history, and those who hold them (such as the then–prime minister John Howard), saying that they suffered from "a failure of imagination", and said that The History Wars "rolls out the canvas of this debate". Macintyre's critics, such as Greg Melluish, lecturer at the University of Wollongong, responded to the book by declaring that Macintyre was a partisan history warrior himself, and that "its primary arguments are derived from the pro-Communist polemics of the Cold War". Keith Windschuttle said that Macintyre attempted to "caricature the history debate". In a foreword to the book, former Chief Justice of Australia Sir Anthony Mason said that the book was "a fascinating study of the recent endeavours to rewrite or reinterpret the history of European settlement in Australia".

== Controversies ==
=== National Museum of Australia controversy ===
In 2001, writing in Quadrant, a conservative magazine, historian Keith Windschuttle argued that the then-new National Museum of Australia (NMA) was marred by political correctness and did not present a balanced view of the nation's history. In 2003, the Howard government commissioned a review of the NMA. A potentially controversial issue was in assessing how well the NMA met the criterion that displays should "cover darker historical episodes, and with a gravity that opens the possibility of collective self-accounting. The role here is in helping the nation to examine fully its own past, and the dynamic of its history—with truthfulness, sobriety and balance. This extends into covering present-day controversial issues." While the report concluded that there was no systemic bias, it recommended that there be more recognition in the exhibits of European achievements.

The report drew the ire of some historians in Australia, who claimed that it was a deliberate attempt on the part of the Government to politicise the museum and move it more towards a position which Geoffrey Blainey called the 'three cheers' view of Australian history, rather than the 'black armband' view. In 2006 columnist Miranda Devine described some of the Braille messages encoded on the external structure of the NMA, including "sorry" and "forgive us our genocide" and how they had been covered over by aluminium discs in 2001, and stated that under the new Director "what he calls the 'black T-shirt' view of Australian culture" is being replaced by "systematically reworking the collections, with attention to 'scrupulous historical accuracy'". An example of the current approach at the NMA is the Bells Falls Gorge Interactive display, which presents Windschuttles's view of an alleged massacre alongside other views and contemporary documents and displays of weapons relating to colonial conflict around Bathurst in 1824 and invites visitors to make up their own minds.

=== University of New South Wales controversy ===
Publication in 2016 of "Indigenous Terminology" guidelines for the teaching and writing of history by the University of New South Wales created a brief media uproar. Amongst the advised language changes, they recommended "settlement" be replaced by "invasion", "colonisation" or "occupation". They also deemed that the generally accepted anthropological assumption that "Aboriginal people have lived in Australia for 40,000 years" should be dropped for "since the beginning of the Dreaming/s" as it "reflects the beliefs of many Indigenous Australians that they have always been in Australia, from the beginning of time" and because "many Indigenous Australians see this sort of measurement and quantifying as inappropriate". While some commentators considered the guidelines appropriate, others categorised them as political correctness that was an anathema to learning and scholarship.

=== Dark Emu ===
Attacks on the aboriginality of Bruce Pascoe and the accuracy of his 2014 book Dark Emu, with its contested claims about agriculture and building before European contact, have been interpreted by Adelaide writer Walter Marsh as a new battlefield in the history wars.

== See also ==
Australian topics

- Historiography of Australia
- Historiography of the British Empire § Australia
- Australia Day debate
- Welcome to country
- Marn Grook, subject of a debate often referred to as "football's history wars"
- Geographical renaming
- Settler colonialism in Australia
- Politics of climate change in Australia

Similar topics in other countries

- Black legend (Spain)
- Critical race theory (United States)
- Historikerstreit (Germany)
- New Historians (Israel)

== Footnotes ==
=== References ===
- Butlin, N. G. (1983). Our Original Aggression, Aboriginal populations of southeastern Australia, 1788–1850. Sydney, Australia: Allen & Unwin. ISBN 086-8-61223-5.
- Campbell, Judy (2002). Invisible Invaders: Smallpox and Other Diseases in Aboriginal Australia 1780–1880. Melbourne University Press.
- Carmody, John; Hunter, Boyd (2014). "Towards more consistent estimates of Aboriginal de-population in the early colonial Australia" (PDF).. Presented at the Asia-Pacific Economic & Business History conference.
- Cumpston, J. H. L. (1914). The history of small-pox in Australia, 1788-1908. Melbourne: Commonwealth of Australia - Quarantine Service.
- Curthoys, Ann (2008). "Genocide in Tasmania: The History of an Idea". In Moses, A. Dirk (ed.). Empire, colony, genocide: conquest, occupation, and subaltern resistance in world history. Studies on war and genocide. Vol. 12. Berghahn Books. pp. 229–252. ISBN 978-1-84545-452-4.
- "Debates on Genocide – Part One". Commonwealth History Project. Debates on "Genocide" in Australian History. Australian Government Department of Education Science and Training. Archived from the original on 12 January 2016.
- "Debates on Genocide – Part Two". Commonwealth History Project. Debates on "Genocide" in Australian History. Australian Government Department of Education Science and Training. Archived from the original on 20 April 2006.
- Docker, John (2008). "Are Settler Colonies Inherently Genocidal? Re-reading Lemkin". In Moses, A. Dirk (ed.). Empire, colony, genocide: conquest, occupation, and subaltern resistance in world history. Studies on war and genocide. Vol. 12. Berghahn Books. pp. 81-101, esp. p. 98. ISBN 978-1-84545-452-4.
- Dowling, Peter (2021). Fatal contact: How epidemics nearly wiped out Australia's first peoples. Clayton, Victoria: Monash University Publishing. ISBN 9781922464460.
- Evans, Raymond & Ørsted–Jensen, Robert: 'I Cannot Say the Numbers that Were Killed': Assessing Violent Mortality on the Queensland Frontier" (paper at AHA 9 July 2014 at University of Queensland) publisher Social Science Research Network (SSRN)
- Macintyre, Stuart; Clark, Anna (2003). The History Wars. Carlton, Victoria: Melbourne University Publishing. ISBN 978-0-522-85091-8.
- Manne, Robert, ed. (2003). Whitewash. On Keith Windschuttle's Fabrication of Aboriginal History. Black Incorporated Agenda. ISBN 978-0-9750769-0-3.
- Moses, A. Dirk (2004). Genocide and Settler Society: Frontier Violence and Stolen Indigenous Children in Australian History. War and genocide. Vol. 6. Berghahn Books. p. 27. ISBN 978-1-57181-411-1.
- Reynolds, Henry (1999). Why Weren't We Told?. Penguin. ISBN 978-0-14-027842-2.
- Reynolds, Henry (2001). An Indelible Stain?: The Question of Genocide in Australia's History. Ringwood: Viking. ISBN 0670912204. OCLC 1010378.
- Stanner, W.E.H. (1979). "After the Dreaming". In Stanner, W.E.H. (ed.). White Man Got No Dreaming: Essays 1938-1973. Australian National University Press. pp. 198–248. ISBN 978-0-7081-1802-3.
- Windschuttle, Keith (2002). The Fabrication of Aboriginal History, Volume One: Van Diemen's Land 1803-1847. Sydney: Macleay Press. ISBN 978-1-876492-05-2.
