= Smallpox in Australia =

Smallpox was a variable yet often fatal viral infectious disease. Even with good nursing, it regularly killed around 30% of recognised cases. Though widespread in Europe and Asia, it was probably unknown in southern Australia when the first British colony began in 1788.

It never became widely established among the colonists, killing only about 100 of them over the next 100 years, and mostly in port-city outbreaks that were traced to visiting ships. Yet a smallpox outbreak in 1789 devastated the Aboriginal people near the Sydney colony, killing perhaps half of them, while sparing the British.

This imbalance leads some medical experts to argue that the main agent of death during major outbreaks of "smallpox" in 1789 and in 1829–1831 was in fact chickenpox. This is a disease to which the British were largely immune but which, in a virgin soil epidemic, can produce symptoms very similar to smallpox. Doctors began to distinguish smallpox more clearly from chickenpox in the early to mid-nineteenth century; and during the 1829–1831 outbreak there was vigorous debate among the colony’s surgeons as to which disease it was, with the chief surgeon favouring chickenpox.

However, most historians have called the 1789 and 1829–1831 diseases smallpox. Smallpox is commonly described as the main or one of the main diseases that reduced the Aboriginal peoples and left them unable to resist European settlement. Debate among modern medical and historical experts as to the identity of the deadly 1789 disease, how it reached Australia, and why it did not infect any of the British (though it killed two non-Europeans who were living inside the British colony) is ongoing.

== Overview ==
European colonisation of Australia was accompanied by epidemic diseases to which the original inhabitants had little resistance. Colds, influenzas, tuberculosis (TB), and measles were major killers. Such diseases devastated Aboriginal populations, weakened their cultures, and often left them in no position to resist the newcomers. Within perhaps as little as six months of the arrival of the First Fleet, venereal disease was already a serious problem for local Aboriginal peoples; but the first disease to produce a major fall in the Aboriginal population around Sydney was the 1789 outbreak, some 16 months after the Fleet arrived, of what Governor Phillip and others referred to as "smallpox". Watkin Tench, a captain in the Marines, wrote that,

pustules, similar to those occasioned in the smallpox, were thickly spread on the bodies; but how a disease to which our former observations had led us to suppose them strangers could at once have introduced itself, and spread so widely, seemed inexplicable.

A full list of smallpox outbreaks in Australia falls into two main groups. Firstly, there were three widely-spaced "Aboriginal" epidemics which devastated Aboriginal populations but largely spared the colonists. Two of these outbreaks were recorded in New South Wales: in 1789 and in 1830. Later there was a long-running outbreak in the 1860s, which spread through much of Northern and Western Australia and down to the Great Australian Bight in the south. In the second group, there were six major ship-borne outbreaks in the nineteenth century, in 1857, 1868–1869, 1871, 1881–1882, 1884–1886, 1887 and 1893. These were successfully confined to port cities, and predominantly affected European colonists. Thereafter, further brushes with imported smallpox were relatively minor.

Although the electron microscope, which is capable of seeing and distinguishing viruses, did not begin to become available to doctors until the 1940s, there is little doubt that at least the second group of outbreaks were true smallpox. They had its typical death-rate of around one death per four recorded infections, and its relatively slow infection rate. They did not selectively kill Aboriginal persons, and there was no mystery as to their origin. In total this second group killed about one hundred people.

The first group of outbreaks, which primarily affected non-Europeans, was more deadly, spread more rapidly, and had a much greater effect upon the history of Australia and the current situation of its Aboriginal peoples. The historian Judy Campbell remarks,

between 1780 and 1870 smallpox itself was the major single cause of Aboriginal deaths. The consequences of Aboriginal smallpox are an integral part of modern Australian history.

The 1789 outbreak, in particular, has been much debated. Several medical experts and anthropologists have argued that it cannot have been smallpox and was probably chickenpox—a highly infectious disease, with partly similar symptoms, to which Europeans though not Aboriginals had considerable immunity. The famous virologist Frank Fenner, who played a major role in the worldwide elimination of smallpox, remarked in 1985:

Retrospective diagnosis of cases or outbreaks of disease in the distant past is always difficult and to some extent speculative. We can never be sure whether the 1789 outbreak was due to smallpox or chickenpox, but the scanty data available seem to me to favour smallpox, though the question of its origin is unexplained.

Since Fenner's 1985 remarks, further historical evidence has been produced, and opinions have hardened. The medical experts Ford and Carmody insist that the failure of the 1789 outbreak to affect Europeans, despite what they consider abundant opportunities, rules out smallpox; yet most historians continue to prefer the traditional view that it was smallpox. (Note: The journals of the First Fleet's surgeons have not survived, but historians infer that they, like Governor Arthur Phillip, called it smallpox.) The extent to which smallpox and chickenpox in 1789 were seen as separate diseases is a grey area.

Among those who believe the disease was smallpox, there are two main theories: that it was introduced from Sulawesi in Indonesia by Macassan traders, and that it was brought directly to south-eastern Australia by European ships. Some, like the independent scholar Christopher Warren, have insisted both that the disease was smallpox and that it was probably released by British colonists in a deliberate act of biological warfare. This view has resonated with some Aboriginal authorities, including professors Maynard and Langton, and the medical officer Dr Mark Wenitong. However, the historians Henry Reynolds, Peter Dowling, and Cassandra Pybus still regard this theory as unproven.

== Outbreaks ==
=== Outbreak of 1789 ===
This disease swiftly inflicted a huge toll on the local Eora population of Aboriginals, causing most of those not infected to flee the region. The epidemic probably began in March 1789, and "subsided by early May". Early in April 1789, (Note: Dowling, here, is quoting David Collins (1975) [Originally published 1798, London] An Account of the English Colony in New South Wales, Volume I, reprint edited by Fletcher, B.H. A.H. & A.W. Reed, Sydney.) British observers noticed the sudden disappearance of the "native canoes" from the Harbour's many coves, investigated, and described the pitiable conditions of the sick or dying Aboriginal persons they discovered there.

The naval officer William Bradley who sailed into Sydney on 9 May 1789 was shocked, noting that some of those abandoned in rock shelters seemed to have died of thirst while too sick to seek water, and that children had often perished beside a dead parent. Another naval officer John Hunter agreed that thirst or hunger had increased the mortality of sufferers "immediately deserted by their friends and left to perish in their helpless situation for want of sustenance". Judy Campbell in her 2002 book Invisible Invaders summed up that the disease's initial impact in 1789 "was especially severe because of shock, flight, and fear, as well as the virus itself". Bradley, unlike Tench, thought it an open question whether the Aboriginal peoples were previously "strangers" to smallpox, while Lieutenant King in his journal was sure they were not; and this has remained a point of contention among historians. Most point to the lack of visible scarring at first contact; but some, including Robert Barnes and Alan Frost, feel that since three observers, King, Hunter and Collins "demonstrated that the Aboriginals had a name for it", the disease was more likely a pre-existing, if infrequent, visitor.

The precise proportion of Aboriginal peoples that perished is difficult to determine, though Governor Phillip estimated that perhaps half had died; and the Aboriginal Bennelong also believed that half the Eora in the Sydney district had died. After a few weeks the canoes returned, and 20 were seen passing Sydney Cove on 2 June 1789; but Phillip's expeditions in subsequent months showed him that the disease, if it began near Sydney, had rapidly moved on to nearby Aboriginal populations.

The Aboriginal peoples do not seem to have associated this disease with the settlement. In mid-1788, they had shown strong resentment of the colony, with several spearings; but by 1791 they had become regular peaceful visitors, even to the Governor's House, as depicted in William Bradley's watercolours. John Hunter noted, "before I left Port Jackson, the natives become [sic] very familiar and intimate with every person in the settlement; many of them took up their rest every night in some of the gentlemen's houses". Yet, in 1789 the outbreak reduced not just the number of Aboriginal persons living near the new settlement but also their fighting strength and presumably their confidence in their culture. The historian Peter Dowling argues that it probably put an end to any possibility of Aboriginals attacking and destroying the colony in its first years.

Like smallpox, this outbreak produced abundant small pustules which often left permanent scarring on survivors. Though it is probable that other recently-introduced diseases were already at work, it is clear that this pustular disease was the main killer of Aboriginal persons. Carmody and Hunter calculated in 2014 that if the disease was really smallpox it would have caused some 30 to 50 recorded cases within the colony, especially among the 84 children. Those who believe the disease was smallpox counter-argue that in early 1789 there was simply not enough contact with the colonists for the disease to reach them.

Some have cited official correspondence in which Governor Arthur Phillip lamented his inability to make contact with Aboriginals. Yet the memoirs of the colony's Lieutenant Governor David Collins suggest that convicts and some of the colony's children may not have had the same problem. He describes, "large parties of the convicts of both sexes on those days in which they were not wanted for labour", holding regular parties with friendly Aboriginals in an adjoining cove "where they danced and sung with apparent good humour". Collins also says that:

Notwithstanding the Town of Sydney was at this time filled with children, many of whom visited the natives that were ill of this disorder, not one of them caught it, though a North-American Indian, a sailor belonging to Captain Ball's vessel [the Supply], sickened of it and died.

This sailor on Supply, known as Joseph Jeffries, died on 2 May 1789 without, as Dowling notes, transmitting it to any of his shipmates. Phillip twice came across groups of sick or dying Aboriginal persons and had them carried back into the colony and carefully treated by the surgeons. In each case, the adults died but a child survived, and was later adopted into a colonist family. No Europeans seem to have caught the disease from these patients; but an Aboriginal person living in the colony, known as Arabanoo, who helped care for the Aboriginal patients, caught the disease and died. Such evidence led to the 1985 debate between Fenner and Hingston (see below) on whether the 1789 disease could really have been smallpox.

The epidemic also began a change in how Aboriginal peoples were seen by Europeans. The surgeon George Bouchier Worgan had written of the local Eora Aboriginals that they: "seemingly enjoy uninterrupted Health, and live to a great Age". Yet as syphilis, TB, influenzas and pneumonias began to afflict the Aboriginal peoples, they began to be seen as diseased and even dying peoples. Looking back in around 1970, the poet Les Murray wrote of how "The thoughtful savage with Athenian flanks/ fades from the old books", and described how the Aboriginal peoples, no longer seen as a threat or as rivals for land, began to be seen as sad exotica, having "the noon trees' spiritual walk", while perhaps "pathetic with sores". Thomas Keneally in his 1967 novel Bring Larks and Heroes, based loosely on the Sydney settlement, makes smallpox (which he describes as afflicting both Aboriginal and European persons) a symbol of the settlement's spiritual sickness.

=== Outbreaks of 1830-1831 and 1860s ===
The 1830s and 1860s outbreaks may well have begun earlier and continued longer than written records reveal. Dowling, for instance, prefers to list the 1830–31 outbreak as 1828–1832. It is also possible, if the 1789 outbreak marked the original infection, that later ones were flare-ups of a disease that now had a permanent epidemic presence in some part of Australia.

These later outbreaks need not have been the same disease as the 1789 one, but they are linked to it by certain arguments. In 1831 the surgeon John Mair reported that several of his informants believed that many Aboriginal persons with pre-existent scarring, presumed to be from smallpox, did not catch the current epidemic. Thus, the debate between the surgeons Mair and Busby (see below), on whether the 1830–1831 outbreak was smallpox or chickenpox, may have implications also for the 1789 epidemic.

The 1860s outbreak or outbreaks have not always been seen as such a major episode in "settlement history", yet they produced a fairly high death rate, and once again overwhelmingly among Aboriginal peoples. Like the two previous outbreaks, these are recorded as having travelled rapidly, but this time far more widely. It is generally believed that they entered Australia in the tropical north, and then spread south and west across much of the continent. If they were smallpox, as has been commonly believed, then their rapid spread might support those who argue that the 1789 outbreak could also have been smallpox, brought to northern Australia from Indonesia in the 1780s and then transmitted overland to Sydney. However, Cumpston records a Northern Territory Medical Officer puzzling in 1906 that the historical records of smallpox invading from the north, and being transmitted as far south as "central Australia", were incompatible with smallpox's failure to behave like this in his day, and adding, "no satisfactory explanation offers itself". Carmody and Hunter, who argue that the 1789 outbreak was chickenpox, do not comment specifically on these later outbreaks, but they remark, as a general principle, that "Chickenpox is about five times more infectious than smallpox [...] and hence fast nationwide transmission is more plausible for chickenpox.

== Smallpox eradication ==
The smallpox vaccine started to be produced in Australia in 1917, and in 1932 community immunization for the public began. The last reported smallpox case in Australia was in 1938. Smallpox vaccination ceased in 1980 after smallpox was certified eradicated worldwide in 1979.

== Macassan ships plus overland transmission of smallpox ==
The theory that smallpox first came to northern Australia from Indonesia, probably with Macassan traders and fishers, and then reached southern Australia along Aboriginal trade routes, has been a major rival to the "brought/released by the British" and the chickenpox theories. Chronologically, the resulting debates, as summarized below, have tended to proceed in a leapfrogging fashion, with proponents of each of the three main theories often producing new versions of their own theory, while rejecting as implausible the latest versions of the two opposing theories.

Medical scientists such as Sir Edward Stirling and Sir John Cleland published a number of books and articles between 1911 and 1966 suggesting that smallpox arrived in Northern Australia from an Asian source, a hypothesis that later scholars usually related to Makassan contact with Australia. While there were cases of smallpox in the city of Macassar in Sulawesi during 1789, there are no reports of it occurring prior to that period. However, smallpox had long been present in other islands of South East Asia – possibly as early as the 4th century, according to virologist Frank Fenner. There were outbreaks of smallpox on the islands of the Indonesian archipelago throughout the 18th century. These included, for example, major epidemics in the Sultanate of Tidore (in the Moluccas) during the 1720s, the Sultanate of Banjar (South Kalimantan), in 1734, 1750–51, 1764–65 and 1778–79; and in southern Sumatra during the 1750s, the 1770s, and in 1786. Macassans had contact with these areas both directly and indirectly (through foreign traders and invaders).

The Macassan theory was also among those considered in his 1914 The History of Small-pox in Australia from 1788 to 1908 by the director of the Australian Quarantine Service, Dr J. H. L. Cumpston. Cumpston was less certain about the earlier outbreaks, but argued that the Macassan theory best explained the source and routes of the 1860s outbreak(s).

Professor Noel Butlin, while advancing his alternative theory that smallpox was released in 1789 near Sydney, rejected the Macassan theory. He argued in 1983 that while Macassan fishermen could possibly "have landed the virus on the Australian mainland at some stage their ability to do so was limited". He contended that it is highly unlikely that this virus should have been brought down from the Gulf of Carpentaria to coincide with the first major outbreak "just fifteen months after the landing of the first fleet". Besides, he argued, the time factor connected to Macassan voyages (of more than seven to eight weeks), the type of vessels, the limited potential for contact between Aboriginal people and fishermen, the lack of clothing as a carrier, and the fact that the virus is destroyed or seriously reduced in contact with salt water, makes the Macassan theory highly unlikely: "[infected] Macassans would be either dead or fully recovered long before reaching the Gulf of Carpentaria. He thought it more likely, therefore, that in 1789 the virus had somehow escaped from inoculation kits carried by the First Fleet's surgeons.

In 1986 C. C. Macknight, an authority on the centuries-old interaction between Indigenous Australians and the people of Makassar (Sulawesi, later part of Indonesia), disagreed, and revived the theory that smallpox was introduced to Australia by Makassan mariners visiting Arnhem Land. In 1993 Butlin appeared to repent his earlier certainty that Macassan transmission was impossible, writing that smallpox had "certainly been delivered to parts of northern Australia and possibly more widely from Macassan praus".

In her 2002 book, Invisible Invaders, the historian Judy Campbell – advised by Fenner – reviewed reports of disease amongst Aboriginal people from 1780 to 1880, including the smallpox epidemics of 1789–90, the 1830s and the 1860s. Campbell argues that the evidence, including that contained in these reports, shows that, while many diseases such as tuberculosis were introduced by British colonists, this was not so for smallpox. She argues that the speculations of British responsibility made by other historians were based on tenuous evidence, largely on the mere coincidence that the 1789–90 epidemic was first observed afflicting the Aboriginal people not long after the establishment of the first British colonial settlement. Campbell argues instead that the north–south route of transmission of the 1860s epidemics (which is generally agreed), also applied in the earlier ones. She is confident that all three were smallpox.

Campbell notes that the fleets of fast Macassan fishing vessels, propelled by monsoonal winds, reached Australia after being at sea for as little as ten to fifteen days, well within the incubation period of smallpox. The numbers of people travelling in the fleets were large enough to sustain smallpox for extended periods of time without it "burning out". The Macassans spent up to six months fishing along the northern Australian coastline and Aboriginal people had "day-to-day contact with the islanders. Aboriginals visited the praus and the camps the visitors set up on shore, they talked and traded...." She also remarks that Butlin, writing in 1983, "did not recognize that Aboriginals were 'great travellers', who spread infection over long distances[...]" She believes that smallpox was spread through their extensive social and trading contacts, as well as by Aboriginal people fleeing from the disease. Campbell also cites British historian Charles Wilson, who cited "medical microbiology" in disagreeing with Butlin about the origins of the 1789 outbreak, and "doubted his estimates of its demographic impact", as well as "First Fleet historian Alan Frost [who] also disagreed with Butlin's views".

Two proponents of the deliberate release hypothesis, Craig Mear (2008) and Michael J. Bennett (2009) have disputed Campbell's Macassan hypothesis, at least for the 1789 outbreak. However, Macknight re-entered the debate in 2011, declaring: "The overwhelming probability must be that it [smallpox] was introduced, like the later epidemics, by [Macassan] trepangers on the north coast and spread across the continent to arrive in Sydney quite independently of the new settlement there." In 2013 Macknight suggested that "substantial contact" between Macassan trepangers and Aboriginals in Northern Australia began "around 1780", making the disease's appearance near Sydney in 1789 entirely plausible. In his view, it was, for the Sydney region, "a completely virgin field event, without the effect of previous epidemics".

The independent scholar Christopher Warren (2014), in an expanded statement of his case that smallpox was deliberately released by the Royal Marines in 1789, rejected the notion that the 1789 epidemic had originated from Macassar. He claimed that there was no evidence of a major outbreak of smallpox in Macassar before 1789; that there were no Indigenous trade routes that would have enabled overland transmission from Arnhem Land to Port Jackson; that the Makassan theory was contradicted by Aboriginal oral tradition; and that 1829 was the earliest point at which there was possible evidence that Makassans had been the source of a smallpox outbreak. Macknight, replying in The Canberra Times on 18 December 2021 and again on 29 December 2021 to a letter of 15 December by Christopher Warren on "the Smallpox Debate", remarked that "many such historical issues are judgements of probability and require a full reading of all the relevant literature", but said that Warren's alternative theory of deliberate infection by the Royal Marines was "very, very probably wrong".

2026 epidemiological modelling showed that "even under ideal conditions and with higher-than-probable infection rates, simulations show that smallpox was unlikely to reach Sydney from a northern entry."

== Smallpox and chickenpox: confused yet distinct ==
Those who attempt to identify "smallpox" or "chickenpox" in Australia's early colonial documents face a complication. These terms may not then have had their modern meanings. Today the Germ theory of disease is widely known and accepted among scientific circles. The theory distinguishes infectious diseases by the microscopic pathogens that produce them. When the same pathogen produces varied effects, modern medical researchers often suggest that differing populations have differing degrees of immunity. Yet surgeons before the second half of the nineteenth-century less often considered such a possibility, because when they diagnosed a "disease" they were identifying a syndrome, a set of symptoms or "disorders", rather than a pathogen". To the English physician Richard Morton writing in 1694, "chickenpox" was simply a vernacular term for the "most benign" (i.e. least virulent) forms of smallpox. Thus, in the words of two modern virologists, "chickenpox (Varicella) was confused with smallpox until the 1800s, when both illnesses became better understood." However, they note that useful laboratory tests for distinguishing between Variola and Varicella infections (indirectly, from their effects on tissue samples) were not available before the 1890s.

While all populations seem at risk from smallpox, some have considerable immunity to the chickenpox virus; and among Europeans chickenpox often produces simply a brief but painful disease of early childhood. Yet early surgeons could not rely upon its usually milder symptoms to distinguish it from smallpox. One reason is that smallpox itself was variable. Even when produced by Variola major (the more deadly of the two species of "true" smallpox) smallpox still had at least four different "presentations", with very different levels of severity and mortality. (Note: As catalogued in 1976 by the Rao scale.)

It was only in the mid twentieth century, when doctors could distinguish with certainty between Variola and Varicella viruses, that the behaviour of chickenpox could be fully distinguished from smallpox. We now know that it is far more infectious than smallpox; that it can in fact be deadly, particularly so in a virgin soil epidemic (a term only introduced to medicine in the 1970s); and that it is more dangerous to adults than to children (the converse of smallpox). By contrast, smallpox, which spreads mainly by "respiratory droplets", is most commonly transmitted after moderately prolonged close contact, usually indoors. We also know, since 1888, that the chickenpox virus remains permanently in the body, and may break out again in times of stress or malnutrition as "shingles," with infectious pustules. There is therefore no difficulty in explaining how this virus reached the colony, since virtually every adult colonist unknowingly carried it.

However, 20th century virology also complicated the picture by introducing a distinction between two types of "true" smallpox. Variola major, the more common and more deadly variant, was now distinguished from Variola minor, also known as Alastrim. Alastrim was less severe and on average far less deadly, with death rates more like 1% — i.e. up to 30 times lower than Variola major's 25%-30% mortality. Prior to the electron microscope, there was debate as to whether alastrim should be called "smallpox" and whether it belonged in the genus Variola. Thus J. H. L. Cumpston and F. McCallum in their 1923 The History of Smallpox in Australia 1909-1923 noted that there was now a worldwide debate about "an exceptionally benign form of the disease", and that in this debate "the unicists desire to see in alastrim merely an expression of variola; [but] the dualists persist in believing it a species sui generis, autonomous and independent." The fact that these two viruses proved eventually to be closely related, plus the fact that infection with one was believed to confer lifelong immunity to the other, caused both in time to be classed as Variola and called smallpox.

However, the possibility that Variola minor might have much less severe effects upon a "virgin soil" population than chickenpox (Varicella zoster), adds to the difficulty of interpreting historical accounts. If, for instance, the deadly 1789 epidemic is believed to be Variola major, then there is some possibility that the less deadly 1830-31 epidemic of "aggravated" Varicella (as diagnosed by the surgeon George Busby in 1831) might be neither chickenpox nor a continuation of the 1789 epidemic, but an early, unrelated outbreak of Variola minor.

Fenner claimed in his 1985 debate with Hingston (described below) that the common view of lay observers that the 1789 disease was smallpox "is persuasive, as all who came on the First Fleet knew smallpox well;" but Carmody has suggested that Governor Arthur Phillip's use of the word "smallpox" rather than "chickenpox" might simply mean that he recognised the 1789 outbreak as virulent. As early as 1767 the British physician William Heberden presented a learned paper On the Chickenpox to the Royal College of Physicians of London. In this he proposed that smallpox and chickenpox were separate syndromes, and that to have recovered from one did not give immunity to the other. Yet, despite there being separate immunities, doctors for some time found it difficult to distinguish chickenpox cases from milder attacks (or possibly mild recurrences) of smallpox. (Modern medical opinion, however, is that smallpox does not recur.)

Heberden's view eventually prevailed, and was cautiously endorsed by David Craigie in 1836 in his influential Elements of the practice of physic. Even so, Craigie noted chickenpox's close resemblance to small-pox, "with which it was always considered as allied, to which it probably bears an intimate relation, and with which it has been often confounded". It is not known if the 1789 surgeons (who were not university-trained physicians but had qualified via an apprenticeship) had read Heberden's paper or what they thought of it.

Yet fifteen years later the Principal Surgeon Thomas Jamison was convinced that smallpox and chickenpox were separate conditions. In 1804 he published in The Sydney Gazette a public warning against numerous recent misidentifications of chickenpox as smallpox by medically untrained settlers. Jamison calls this confusion, "an error that may be readily imbibed by those who are not conversant in the natural small pox: for I most positively affirm, on my own personal knowledge for ten years past, that not a single instance of the latter disease has occurred in this country." There were to be similar warnings, especially in the context of the 1830s epidemic, against trusting lay observers to identify smallpox. Cumpston quotes Busby's remarks in his 1831 Report to Bowman, plus other nineteenth-century observers, including the historians G.W. Rusden and Roderick Flanagan, and also George Bennett M.D., who suggest or assert that the symptoms, or the scars, of chickenpox or "native pock" were often mistaken in this period by non-medical observers for true smallpox.

Cumpston also quotes several authors who, being aware of low levels of vaccination in parts of New South Wales, express surprise that the supposed smallpox so rarely transferred from Aboriginals to European adults or children. Flanagan, for instance, found it extremely strange that in 1831 in northern New South Wales, "not one instance occurred wherein the infection communicated itself to the white population of the settlement".

Such warnings have not always been thought relevant by historians of the 1789 outbreak. For instance, Craig Mear in 2008 wrote: "it is clear that they [the Aboriginals] died from a smallpox virus, for the people of the First Fleet knew smallpox when they saw it." Frank Fenner in his Foreword to Invisible Invaders (2002) claimed (as he had in an earlier debate with Hingston) that "the early settlers and the explorers were well aware from personal experience of the symptoms of smallpox . . . so that their comments on such matters are reliable". Judy Campbell in her Preface to Invisible Invaders insists that, "in First Fleet letters and journals there was not one dissenting voice. No one even mentioned chickenpox, and, without exception, contemporaries who knew smallpox said it was the cause of the extensive outbreaks." In fact, Watkin Tench, among others, was more cautious, referring to "pustules similar to those occasioned by the small pox", while Mair in 1831 claimed only that "the greater number" [i.e. a majority] of experienced lay observers agreed that the current outbreak was smallpox.

By the time of the 1830-31 outbreak there was (as described below) considerable agreement among the colony's surgeons that chickenpox and smallpox were separate diseases, but vigorous debate as to which disease they were dealing with.

== 1831 Mair-Busby debate: chickenpox versus smallpox ==
In 1831 the Governor requested John Mair, a talented young regimental surgeon, newly arrived in the Bathurst region, to investigate the 1830-1831 epidemic. Mair sent back the alarming news that it was almost certainly smallpox. Mair noted that the disease, "approached more nearly in its symptoms to the character of small-pox than any other disease with which we are acquainted", adding that the death rate varied "from one in three to one in five or six, but might have been less" if patients had had shelter and medical attention. (These are low mortality rates for smallpox, and well below the 50% mortality that Phillip and Bennelong estimated for the 1789 outbreak.) Mair also remarked that vaccination seemed to control it, since "three blacks who had been successfully vaccinated, although equally exposed to the disease, escaped infection". (A consignment of cowpox serum, permitting true vaccination, had been brought to Sydney in 1804, six years after Jenner's successful experiment in 1796; and with official support it had been fairly widely distributed.)

However, George Busby, the surgeon in charge of the Bathurst hospital, contradicted Mair's diagnosis. Busby, backed by the colony's senior surgeon James Bowman, informed the Governor that the outbreak appeared to be chickenpox. Busby also reported that when he examined two Aboriginal men he was unsure of his diagnosis; but later, when he saw the full course of the disease while treating a European man, who had caught the disease from an Aboriginal housemate who died of it, he tentatively diagnosed chickenpox, or in his words:

[V]aricella, manifesting itself in a more aggravated form than it is known usually to assume, but possessing by no means a malignant [i.e. deadly and unstoppable] character, nor likely, under ordinary circumstances of comfort and attention attainable in civilized society, to prove fatal in more than a few instances.

Busby also remarked:

It is the concurrent testimony of all who have had opportunities of affording them [Aboriginals] assistance, that in every case, even of the worst kind, in which a little salts were administered, and a little food, such as tea or milk, supplied them, with protection from the inclemency of the weather, they have, without exception, recovered.

Busby did not suggest a difference in immunity between Aboriginals and Europeans. He attributed the higher Aboriginal deathrate to nomadic living conditions and inappropriate care.

Dr J. H. L. Cumpston, in his massive 1914 The History of Small-Pox in Australia 1788–1908 quoted Busby's arguments at length, while appearing to discount them. Yet Cumpston remarked that a recurrent theme in his History ("the oft-repeated tale has to be told again") was the long debate in Australian medical journals between doctors who, like Busby, insisted that a case or an outbreak was severe chickenpox, not smallpox, versus the orthodox view that if the pox disease, on its own, was causing deaths then it must be smallpox—a view on which he cited Richard Quain's 1882 Dictionary of Medicine: "no physician has recorded a fatal case of chicken-pox". Cumpston inclined towards the second view: "It is a matter of common knowledge that chicken-pox is very rarely fatal". Yet he immediately after cites statistics that in Victoria, between 1857 and 1910, 70 deaths were attributed to chickenpox, versus 27 to smallpox. He comments that such frequent debates and confusions "make one wonder to what extent the officially reported outbreaks of small-pox represent the real incidence of the disease". He also remarks that, with the exception of the cases described by Mair and Busby, "there is no definite record of the existence of small-pox amongst Europeans in New South Wales before [...] 1874."

Peter Dowling in his 2021 book Fatal Contact notes that the Governor and Council accepted Busby's and Bowman's advice. However Dowling dismisses Busby's diagnosis, claiming that the European patient's symptoms were those to be expected in a recurrence of smallpox ("a secondary bout of infection with smallpox virus", something which Dowling claims is possible when the earlier infection was Variola minor not Variola major). Dowling is here in conflict with Campbell, who believes that all outbreaks of smallpox before the 1890s were Variola major, but he shares her conclusion that Busby was wrong. He indexes his account under "Busby, George (Dr)... chickenpox, misdiagnosis of".

Dowling mentions that the outbreak killed two Europeans in families that had taken in sick Aboriginals. He also mentions that Mair noted the 1831 outbreak was more dangerous to adults, being "chiefly fatal to adults and old people, seldom to children",—a pattern that modern medical authorities describe as typical of chickenpox outbreaks, but not of smallpox.

Views of Mair's Report, and of his credibility versus Busby's, continue to divide modern historians. Hilary M. Carey and David Roberts in their 2002 study of the 1830s outbreak, state that

Mair is the chief authority for the immediate impact of the epidemic, though the value of his observations is seriously limited. He did not travel to the outer districts, preferring to gather reports from various local sources. . . Moreover, by the time Mair went to Bathurst in early October 1831, the crisis had passed.

By contrast, Judy Campbell in her Invisible Invaders, also published in 2002, accepts Mair's account. She repeatedly criticizes Busby (who was 33 in 1830) as too young and inexperienced to recognize smallpox, even when its symptoms were plain to older settlers. Dowling in his book Fatal Contact (2021) sits between these two views, believing that Mair's diagnosis was right, although he concedes that Mair arrived "too late to observe firsthand the disease among the Wiradjuri" and was dependent upon "eyewitnesses".

== 1985 Fenner-Hingston debate ==
One hundred and fifty-four years later than Mair's debate with Busby, in February 1985, there was a simultaneous exchange of letters in the Medical Journal of Australia. Professor Frank Fenner had contributed an article on the eradication of smallpox. Richard Hingston, a doctor who had faced a deadly epidemic of chickenpox in rural Papua, with symptoms "clinically akin to smallpox", praised the article; but he took Fenner to task for implying that the 1789 outbreak had been smallpox:

All agreed on the absence of smallpox in Europeans, both before and after arrival in the colony. A seaman of the Supply caught it [the 1789 outbreak] from the Aboriginals, but he was a North-American Indian. Europeans dismiss chicken-pox as a trivial disease of childhood, but it presents very differently in populations without previous immunity. [...] Chicken-pox in members of the First Fleet would probably not have been reported, for the same reason that it is not newsworthy today. The same infection, transmitted to Aboriginals, would not have been recognised on account of its different clinical course.

Fenner, in his reply, conceded that Hingston had a point: "Chicken-pox is a possible alternative diagnosis for the 1789 epidemic among the Aboriginals of eastern Australia... but I favour the more widespread opinion that the disease was smallpox". He also conceded, as noted above, that "We can never be sure whether the 1789 outbreak was due to smallpox or chickenpox." However, Fenner offered a group of arguments that he believed, collectively if not individually, justified his favouring the smallpox theory.

One involves evidence that the 1789 and the 1830–1831 epidemics were the same disease. Fenner cited Mair's Report that the 1830-1831 outbreak was smallpox, and linked this to Mair's strong suspicion that Aboriginals with scarring from a much older epidemic (perhaps, Fenner suggested, the 1789 one) might now be immune. However, later research by Dowling (notably, a strong proponent of the smallpox theory) appears to weaken this argument. Dowling found that Mair arrived too late to observe any active cases of the disease. Moreover, as mentioned above, the local surgeon, George Busby, disagreed and diagnosed chickenpox.

Dowling also recognises the importance of Lieutenant Governor David Collins's memoir, and cites passages from it that may tell against two of Fenner's other suggestions: that there was not a sufficient concentration of children in the colony to sustain a chickenpox outbreak, and that there was not sufficient contact with Aboriginals for the colonists to have caught smallpox from them. However, the children Collins mentions as visiting sick Aboriginals in 1789 without catching the disease would have been born in the UK, and many may have been already immune to chickenpox.

Fenner also argued that the frequent reports of scarring on survivors suggested smallpox. He recognised the importance of "hygiene" in preventing contamination of the open pustules of either disease, but said that even in more recent chickenpox plagues among Somali nomads (whose hygiene state he estimated was probably "similar to that of the Aboriginals in 1789") serious scarring after chicken-pox was very rare: 2.4% of cases were seen one year after the attack, compared with 85% from smallpox. However, when Christopher Warren used a variant of this argument on Ockham's Razor in April 2014, Carmody argued in reply that the severity of the virus attack could not be retrospectively deduced from the degree of scarring, "in part because there would have been a great deal of bacterial infection of the skin lesions, which would have worsened the scarring".

The debate in the medical journal in 1985 was not pursued. Fenner's "favouring" of the smallpox theory was useful to its proponents, but was weakened by his explicit statements that chickenpox could not be ruled out.

However, some smallpox proponents have represented this debate as a crushing defeat for the chickenpox theory. Christopher Warren has stated, for instance, "The chickenpox story is an old theory that has been dealt with. It was floated by Richard Hingston in the Australian Medical Journal in 1985 and was immediately rebutted by a leading virologist, Professor Frank Fenner." Warren has also claimed that Fenner's 1985 argument about Mair is conclusive. In 2021 when Carmody criticized a reviewer for assuming the 1789 epidemic was smallpox, she responded: "Richard Hingston floated the chickenpox theory in 1985, but this was rebutted by virologist Frank Fenner."

Dowling, in his 1997 ANU PhD thesis "A Great Deal of Sickness" offered a new version of Fenner's remark that the scanty data mean that "we can never be sure" which disease it was. Dowling stated, "The little evidence we have pertaining to the 1789 epidemic in the Sydney region has left some historians and medical writers (Crosby 1986; Cumpston 1914; Curson 1985; Hingston 1985: 278) with doubts as to whether it was smallpox." Twenty-eight years later, in the chapter on smallpox in his 2021 book Fatal Contact, Dowling more firmly rejected the chickenpox theory. He again expressed admiration for Fenner, and implied that his own views are similar to Fenner's. In a brief section called "Disproving the doubters", Dowling does not describe the arguments or mention the names of Cumpston, Moodie, Curson, Hingston, Carmody, Ford, Wright and others who have advanced the chickenpox theory; but he does offer a series of arguments against chickenpox. These are very similar to the arguments Fenner used in his debate with Hingston, but with significant expansion of some points, notably the argument about scarring.

In a further complication, Fenner's favouring of the smallpox hypothesis seems to have strengthened after 1985. Judy Campbell in her 2002 book Invisible Invaders quotes Fenner as stating (presumably in a personal communication to her): "I have not the slightest doubt that the disease described by Mair was smallpox... there are so many features that are characteristic of smallpox and of no other disease".

Fenner's expert opinion, as relayed by Campbell, might seem to resolve the debate at last, in favour of Mair and of smallpox. Campbell believed so, writing that Mair's Report was "central to the retrospective diagnosis of Aboriginal smallpox." Yet some complications remain.

== Fenner's collaboration with Campbell on Invisible Invaders (2002) ==
Though Campbell in her Preface thanks Fenner (who contributed a Foreword) for his "generous advice" during the years she was working on the book, she seems not to know of his debate with Hingston, or of some of the points on which Hingston and Fenner had agreed in 1985. Thus, she confidently states that chickenpox "is a mild disease", and that, "Chickenpox has never killed or scarred its victims in the way smallpox did."

Both Fenner's Foreword and Campbell's Preface make clear that Fenner's role was to advise as a virologist on the evidence that Campbell assembled from historical documents. He did not necessarily read and check all (or all parts of) the documents she cited; and he may sometimes have taken her notes and her historical interpretations on faith. Dowling, who did check, in his 2021 book Fatal Contact, corrects or omits some of Campbell's claims that are relevant to the diagnosis.

Campbell was under the impression that Mair's December 1831 Report contained his own observations of the stages of active cases he had seen, claiming in her introductory chapter that Mair in 1831 "saw active smallpox in the Bathurst region". By contrast, she claimed that Busby was one of those "younger settlers" who (unlike Mair) had never seen smallpox (because of the supposed success of vaccination in the UK); and she stated that Busby and others therefore "did not recognise smallpox when they saw it in 1831". She also implied that Busby was a junior surgeon whose opinion should carry less weight, while implying that Mair (though his birth date seems to be unknown, and he had only the rank of assistant regimental surgeon) was more experienced and credible.

Fenner's brief Foreword endorses Campbell's conclusions on the three main epidemics she identifies as smallpox. His almost unparalleled knowledge of smallpox as a (till-recently) living disease makes his identification of Mair's 1831 list of symptoms as traits of smallpox extremely persuasive. However, we do not know which of the other historical documents Fenner himself had read. We also do not have the full text of the document or letter from Fenner, out of which Campbell quoted (with some words omitted) his verdict on Mair's list of symptoms. We cannot be certain Fenner knew that most of these symptoms were gathered at second hand; and we do not know what he made, or would have made, of Busby's different detailed list of synonyms.

Overall, Fenner's opinion carries weight; yet there is some room for proponents of the chickenpox hypothesis to question whether Fenner would have found Mair's 1831 list of symptoms equally conclusive if he had viewed Busby as comparably qualified (as well as better positioned) to observe the disease.

== The chickenpox theory ==
Cumpston in his 1914 History cites many medical discussions of the once-common term "native pock". It seems to have meant different things to different users, but sometimes sounds like Busby's "aggravated" varicella. Chief Surgeon James Bowman in 1831 had no doubt it was chickenpox. Cumpston cites an unnamed doctor observing in a medical journal in 1846:

Hitherto this colony has been exempt from small-pox. We are aware that a disease which has appeared, and proved very destructive among the aboriginal tribes at various times, is supposed to be small-pox, but there is no distinct evidence on that point. If it were, it would be a curious question to ascertain how it came among them, and how it happened not to have extended to the white population, a large proportion of which must, from the want of vaccination, have been so favourably situated for its reception. The condition known by the name of "native pock" is doubtless a varioloid disease, but resembles more a severe form of varicella [i.e. chickenpox] than true variola.

The first clear statement that at least one of the major outbreaks was chickenpox, may be Busby's in 1831. Cumpston shows that thereafter for some decades both Busby and Mair had their supporters in medical journals.

In the 1970s there was increasing awareness that a pathogen could become much more deadly when it first appeared in an "immunologically naïve" population. This led to a re-emergence of the chickenpox theory. Peter Moodie in his 1973 book Aboriginal Health remarked that virgin soil epidemics can cause a childhood disease to afflict all age-groups at once. He noted that chickenpox "in recent decades" was not, or was no longer, a particular danger to Aboriginals; but he argued that, since the 1789 outbreak spared Europeans, it may have been a particularly virulent form of chickenpox. Similar views were put forward tentatively by Peter Curson in 1983, then more confidently by Hingston (1985), and Barry Wright (1987).

For the next 20 years the chickenpox theory was less often mentioned. However, in 2010 John Carmody, a professor of medicine, vigorously re-asserted it on Robyn Williams's Ockham's Razor program on ABC Radio National. Carmody claimed that the 1789 epidemic could not have been smallpox and was almost certainly chickenpox. He argued that smallpox, being much less infectious than chickenpox, could not have spread so rapidly from tribe to tribe around Sydney (nor from Arnhem Land to the Sydney region); but if present would certainly have infected some of the European colonists: "If it had really been smallpox, I would have expected about 50 cases amongst the colonists". Carmody said that this would have produced several recorded deaths, since smallpox has about a 30% fatality rate. However, he said, the only non-Aboriginal person reported to have died in this outbreak was a seaman called Joseph Jeffries, who was recorded as being "a North American Indian". Carmody also remarked that if the virus had been smallpox and derived from the surgeons' inoculation jars, it would have "had to endure three summers before that 1789 outbreak".

Carmody noted that chickenpox can take a severe toll on populations with little hereditary or acquired immunological resistance, and that it was certainly present in the colony. With regard to how smallpox could have reached the colony, Carmody later said: "There is absolutely no evidence to support any of the theories and some of them are fanciful and far-fetched." In response, Christopher Warren rejected suggestions that chickenpox caused the 1789 epidemic, and that it was fanciful to think that smallpox virus could have survived so long in dried scab. Warren in 2008 had already suggested that Campbell had erred in assuming that high temperatures would have sterilised the British supply of smallpox. However H. A. Willis (2010), in a survey of the literature discussed above, endorsed Campbell's argument. In response, Warren (2011) suggested that Willis had not taken into account research on how heat affects the smallpox virus, cited by the WHO. Willis (2011) replied that his position was supported by a closer reading of Frank Fenner's report to the WHO (1988) and invited readers to consult that report online.

Carmody's argument on the Science Show was not, for some time, followed by a scholarly paper, and was ignored by many historians. However, another medical researcher working on diseases among Aboriginals in the early colonial era (this time not on the Eora but on adjacent groups to the North West), G. E. Ford, stated in late 2010 that he had previously and independently reached Carmody's conclusions: "In a project applying a specialist understanding of disease and epidemiology from my own previous professional life as a pathobiologist, I had verified that the small pox was not Smallpox but was Chicken Pox brought to the colony in a latent form later known as Shingles". Ford also said that he had "identified a likely convict carrier and the means by which the chicken pox infection spread through the population".

However Ford concedes that neither he nor Carmody can claim priority for this theory since: "In 1985 a teacher of 'medical geography', Peter Curson of Macquarie University presented a good case on historic evidence that the disease was chickenpox." Ford added that at a conference in 1987, the archaeologist Barry Wright presented similar arguments and conclusion. To maintain coherence with earlier historical accounts, Ford refers to "the small pox epidemic" of 1789–1791, but makes two words of "small pox" and reminds the reader that he believes the "small pox" in question was "Chicken Pox, a small pox other than Smallpox".

In a conference paper in February 2014 on historic Aboriginal demography, the Australian National University's Boyd Hunter joined with Carmody to argue that the recorded behaviour of the 1789 epidemic rules out smallpox and indicates chickenpox. In 2021 Carmody summarized the case against smallpox:

The reality was that not one of the British settlers succumbed to the disease (especially no children, who are especially vulnerable to smallpox), despite the fact that some of them had exceedingly close contact with the victims. That outcome would have been impossible if the illness really had been smallpox. The far more likely diagnosis would have been chickenpox, which virtually every colonist would have carried in their nervous system as a residue of childhood infection. When some of them, in the stress of quotidian colonial life, developed 'shingles', the children would have developed chickenpox and then passed it into the Aboriginal community, which, in all probability, had no previous experience of that disease.

Yet, despite Ford's and even Fenner's agreement that chickenpox must eventually have entered the colony via shingles and was then very likely to spread fast and prove fatal to Aboriginals, there is no hard evidence that it had in fact appeared by April 1789. (The surviving part of Chief Surgeon John White's journal suggests that it had not been noticed by November 1788).

There is also some contradiction between Hingston's scenario, in which the surgeons recognised and ignored childhood chickenpox as unimportant, and Carmody's. Carmody doubts that the surgeons in 1789 believed there was a distinction between the two diseases, but implies they may not have noted a child or children who carried an infection of chickenpox, from an adult with shingles, to Aboriginal children with whom they played. No surviving records have been produced that mention "smallpox" inside the colony, even though Tench and others were puzzling over how it reached the Aboriginals.

=== Unresolved issues in the chickenpox debate ===
However, the same difficulty in documenting the first appearance of chickenpox in Australia may also complicate the scenarios of those who are quite sure that the 1789 outbreak was not chickenpox. Chickenpox, as Fenner and Hingston agreed, is a proven killer of "virgin soil" populations, and none of the experts who favour smallpox has yet argued that Aboriginals had immunity to chickenpox. If the spike in Aboriginal deaths in 1789 cannot be attributed to the arrival of chickenpox, then chickenpox's initial impact upon Aboriginal populations remains to be documented. Colin Tatz in his Genocide in Australia: By Accident or Design? puts chickenpox ahead of smallpox, at the head of a list of major "settler-introduced diseases", but does not provide details.

Yet Fenner, in his 1985 debate with Hingston, gives reasons to doubt that chickenpox in 1789-1790 could have produced the rates of death or of scarring that the records suggest. The common Aboriginal custom of living naked and sometimes sleeping naked on bare earth around their campfires is well documented, and might well have worsened the scarring, as Carmody suggests, via bacterial contamination of open pustules. Yet Fenner's striking statistic about a lethal epidemic of chickenpox producing only a 2.4% rate of serious scarring among its survivors seems a potential problem for the chickenpox explanation of the 1789 epidemic.

Governor Phillip's rough estimate of a 50% death-rate is far more like that of smallpox than of chickenpox, though unusually high for either disease. Carmody and Hunter cite "a very severe epidemic" of chickenpox in the French Cameroons in 1936 that killed 19.3% of clinical cases, i.e. of cases that received some clinical treatment; and they themselves estimate a likely death-rate among Aboriginals in 1789 of some 30%. This, they recognise, is still "substantially lower than most of the smallpox based assumptions in Butlin's research". They argue, however, that other co-morbidities may have meant that Aboriginals were really suffering "multiple epidemics", for which the pox disease with its spectacular eruptions took the whole blame. The Aboriginal public health expert Dr Mark Wenitong has rejected such arguments, telling the ABC in 2021:"It looked like smallpox and acted like smallpox and the outcomes were high mortality rates like smallpox."

The speed with which the 1789 disease spread does not necessarily prove it was chickenpox, since unknown cultural factors or behaviours might have aided it; and Dowling says that it was common for smallpox to become highly transmissible "in a virgin soil population". Very little or nothing is known about how much the behaviour of either disease may have changed in a truly "virgin soil" Aboriginal population in 1789. The failure to infect and kill Europeans remains the clearest argument that it was not smallpox.

Some proponents of the smallpox theory, however, invert this argument, claiming that smallpox failed to infect Europeans precisely because they were already immune to it. Carmody and Hunter (2014) agree that those colonists who had suffered smallpox were now immune; but they argue that smallpox's epidemic behaviour in Britain, with its "impressively constant" rates of infection and death, proves the population as a whole was far from immune. They calculate that about half of the colonists, including almost all the younger children, were vulnerable. Dowling concedes that many of the roughly one thousand colonists would not have been immune to smallpox, including especially the children. However, he doubts that there was sufficient contact with Aboriginals.

To accept the 1789 "smallpox epidemic" as the work of chickenpox would involve a large-scale re-evaluation of the history of such epidemics. All supposed epidemics of "smallpox" recorded before 1800—especially if they moved rapidly, and if they affected previously unexposed populations—might be suspected of being the more infectious chickenpox. The whole history and epidemiology of smallpox in the Americas might need to be re-examined. In Australia too there would be new matters to research. For instance, Carmody and Hunter remark that it is "reasonable to assume that chickenpox then [i.e. after 1789] spread relatively quickly across the continent from Port Jackson [Sydney] because it has a very high infection rate."

In Europe and Asia many long-running debates about the identity of past plagues, such as the Black Death, have supposedly been solved in the twenty-first century by DNA evidence. To date, no DNA evidence has been offered on the 1789 epidemic.

== Deliberate release theories, 1789 ==
Though the First Fleet itself did not arrive with any known carriers of the disease, the observation of an epidemic some 16 months after the colony was established has led to speculation that the Fleet itself brought this disease to Australia. Fleet Surgeon John White carried sealed samples of dried smallpox scabs for use in variolation; and whilst Governor Arthur Phillip's contemporary account records that White assured him that his samples remained sealed in their flask at the time of the 1789 outbreak, some historians and commentators have since speculated that the outbreak was caused by their release from the surgeon's stores, either by accident (perhaps via theft), or deliberately.

The theories on deliberate release rely on circumstantial evidence. Whilst economic historian Noel Butlin expounded the theory in 1983, Australian historian Thomas Keneally notes that there is no evidence for it, and Geoffrey Blainey has written that the weight of fresh evidence has discounted it. The colonists had arrived on orders from King George III to live in "amity and kindness" with the Aboriginal natives and any deliberate use of smallpox to harm the Eora would therefore have been against the laws of the colony's establishment.

Keneally wrote in The Commonwealth of Thieves (2005) that, after First Fleet Sergeant Scott found three natives apparently suffering smallpox on 15 April, 1789, Governor Phillip rushed to the scene with a surgeon and his Aboriginal interlocutor, Arabanoo. Finding an old man and boy with advanced symptoms, and nearby two corpses, the Governor brought the survivors back to Surgeon White's hospital where they were quarantined. The boy Nanbaree was nursed back to health and adopted by Surgeon White, while the elder died.

Keneally noted that the disease was considered by the colonists to be "eminently survivable" by the standards of the time, most having suffered it, and many having been already inoculated against it. The Ship's surgeon John White had brought a flask of 'variolous material' (variola being Latin for smallpox), "just in case he needed to inoculate the young against an outbreak in the penal colony."

There is no record of the surgeons using this material. In his contemporary account, Watkin Tench called the outbreak an "extraordinary calamity" and speculated as to whether the disease might be indigenous to the country; or whether it had been brought to the colony by the French expedition of Lapérouse a year before; had traversed the continent from the west where Europeans had previously landed; been brought by the expedition of James Cook; or indeed had arrived with the first British settlers at Sydney. "Our surgeons brought out variolous matter in bottles", he wrote, "but to infer that it was produced from this cause were a supposition so wild as to be unworthy of consideration".

According to Keneally, the outbreak of the disease "genuinely puzzled" Governor Phillip, who speculated that the pox may have travelled overland from contact with Macassans in the north. Surgeon White had assured him that there had been no signs of the disease on the Fleet, and that his flask of material remained "unbroken and secure on a shelf". La Perouse had also told Phillip that his men were free of the disease.

In his Rise and Fall of Ancient Australia (2015), the historian Blainey noted that the 1789 smallpox outbreak went on to kill perhaps half of the Aborigines of the Sydney district. Blainey writes that economic historian Noel Butlin's book Our Original Aggression (1983) argued that the smallpox conveyed by ship from England had been deliberately let loose, however, Blainey notes, "The weight of fresh evidence, uncovered by diligent researchers, has discounted his thesis without totally discrediting it."

According to Keneally,

"There is no evidence of anyone's intention at this early stage to conduct biological warfare. As for the smallpox virus having survived the journey from England, experts believe it was unlikely to have survived in dry crusts or clothing for more than a year. So the question remains how it could have survived so long in the First Fleet to have reached out and struck the Eora ... two years after departing England."

Variolation, a form of inoculation with dried smallpox scab, was a well-recognised medical practice, up till and even after the process of smallpox vaccination (with cowpox) was successfully demonstrated by Edward Jenner in 1796. By Butlin's account, Variolation was a risky procedure, since recipients sometimes died of the resulting infection, or spread it to others; yet during severe epidemics it seems to have provided significant protection, perhaps because the patient received only a small infection from the dried scab, and was thereafter immune. Dried smallpox scab was thus commonly stored in glass containers as part of a surgeon's remedies. Successful variolation produced a single localised mark called a papule at the site of infection, so surgeons would normally know if their scab-samples were still valid.

Dowling finds evidence that by 1830, with the assistance of well-meaning settlers, many Aboriginal people seem to have been either vaccinated (with cowpox), or else 'inoculated" (i.e. variolated) — a method which would seem to have risked spreading either smallpox (Variola major or Variola minor) or its partial lookalike chickenpox. Similarly, granted the frequent confusion between the two diseases, any epidemic liberated from the surgeons' variolation-jars in 1789 might possibly have been chickenpox rather than smallpox. Thus, the chickenpox theory and the deliberate-release theory need not contradict each other. However, most proponents of the deliberate-release theory, assume that the 1789 epidemic was smallpox.

Historians have continued to speculate on the means by which smallpox might have travelled from Indonesia via Macassan traders and thence overland to southern Australia. However in 1914 Dr J. H. L. Cumpston, while not ruling out this possibility, nor the possibility that it was chickenpox, put forward a rival theory, that smallpox in some way reached NSW in 1789 via British settlers. He did not believe smallpox infections could have gone unnoticed, and so thought that the "variolous matter" mentioned by Watkin Tench "cannot be dismissed lightly as a possible source of the epidemic. It is at least as likely a theory as that of the introduction by the French sailors." However Cumpston thought that "this question can never be settled unless some hitherto undiscovered records come to light".

This theory was revived and expanded in 1983 when Professor Noel Butlin, an economic historian, suggested: "it is possible and, in 1789, likely, that infection of the Aboriginal people was a deliberate extermination act". Butlin did not specify how the virus was released, but (having argued that the Macassan/overland theory was implausible) he suggested that the most likely explanation of smallpox's appearance in 1789 was that it had been transferred somehow, by theft, accident, or the like, from scab originally stored in glass containers carried by just one of the seven medical officers on the first fleet.

Several historians thereafter mentioned this possibility, and debated if this was more plausible than overland transmission. David Day (2001) reiterated Butlin's argument and suggested that members of Sydney's garrison of Royal Marines may have attempted to use smallpox as a biological weapon in 1789. The following year, however, John Connor stated that Day's theory was "unsustainable". Historian Henry Reynolds in 2001 repeated Butlin's claims and wrote: "one possibility is that the epidemic was deliberately or accidentally let loose by someone in the settlement at Sydney Cove."

However revived arguments for overland transmission were put by Judy Campbell in her 2002 book Invisible Invaders, and Macknight (1986 and 2011). H. A. Willis complained in 2010 that Butlin's supporters had ignored the fact that his study, "was confined to the period before 1850. Yet the 1860s epidemic shows that smallpox could and did travel overland from northern Australia." There was also, in the 1980s, a re-emergence of the rival chickenpox theory.

The independent scholar Christopher Warren (2007, 2014) became a strong advocate of the view that smallpox was deliberately released from the surgeon's inoculation jars as an act of germ warfare. This led him into complex debates with Fenner, Carmody, Willis and others as to whether these inoculation samples could have been protected from heat sufficiently to be still viable in April 1789. However, in 2014 he laid out an argument that the colony in April 1789 was in an extremely weak military position versus the Aboriginals, and speculated that the release of smallpox was a response to this by one or more of the colonists, perhaps without the Governor's knowledge. Warren also cited a story from the Balmoral region of North Sydney, reported in 2001 by the Aboriginal academic Dennis Foley: "According to Foley, an Aboriginal oral tradition reported that, at Balmoral, there were blankets with red markings, a stripe of words or a crown and that those who took the blankets died a horrible death of fire under their skin and the pus of a thousand festering sores." Warren suggests that concentrations of Aboriginal remains around Sydney "are consistent with a release of smallpox at Balmoral and at Botany Bay [south of Sydney] with some natives dying as they fled north and south." In 2021 Warren claimed that "the British had no other option than to use smallpox against local Aboriginals in 1789 because they had no ammunition for their muskets [...]".

While acknowledging Carmody's and Ford's argument that chickenpox was present on the First Fleet and would have become infectious via shingles, Warren argued in his 2014 article that it was suspicious that in April 1789 a smallpox epidemic "was reported amongst the Port Jackson Aboriginal tribes who were actively resisting settlers from the First Fleet". When the Ockham's Razor radio program for 13 April 2014 invited Warren to re-state these arguments, Carmody responded briefly on the same program, claiming that there was in fact "no hard medical evidence" that the 1789 outbreak was smallpox, and said that the surgeons' inoculation samples would have been inert by April 1789.

=== Analogies with North America ===
Warren, however, argues that the British had already used smallpox in just this way in North America:

In the eighteenth century, British forces using smallpox was not unprecedented. This tactic was promoted by Major Robert Donkin. It was initiated by General Jeffrey Amherst in 1763 and smallpox-laden blankets and a handkerchief were distributed from Fort Pitt near the Great Lakes in North America.

In June 1763, during Pontiac's War, Colonel Henry Bouquet ordered smallpox blankets to be distributed to a Delaware delegation when they laid siege to Fort Pitt. Yet A. R. Rao's careful researches in the 1960s found little truth in the traditional belief that smallpox can be spread at a distance through infected clothing or bedding; and there is independent evidence that Bouquet's attempt, even with very fresh material from the smallpox epidemic inside their own fort, was unsuccessful.

The analogy with the Sydney colony is not perfect, in that smallpox had long been a scourge in North America, whereas in Australia the British would have been infecting their new territory with a deadly disease from which it (and its new colonists) had been free. Henry Reynolds commented in 2001: "Not surprisingly this is a highly contentious proposition. If true, it would clearly fall within the ambit of the Genocide Convention". Seth Carus of the National Defense University in the US wrote in 2015 that: "Ultimately, we have a strong circumstantial case supporting the theory that someone deliberately introduced smallpox in the Aboriginal population". However, Colin Tatz in his 2011 Genocide in Australia: By Accident or Design? rejects as absurd the notion that the British would have deliberately released in Australia a disease that they had so much reason to fear.

Several historians, while sticking with the traditional diagnosis of smallpox, have remained non-committal about how it reached the Sydney region in 1789. In 2020 Professor Henry Reynolds told the ABC that just how smallpox could have got to Sydney remained and might always remain "a real mystery". Also, in August 2021, the historian Cassandra Pybus, in a review of Peter Dowling's 2021 book Fatal Contact: How Epidemics Nearly Wiped Out Australia's First People, rejected the suggestion that smallpox was deliberately released from the surgeons' "variolous matter" as "very circumstantial", drew attention to "David Collins' observation that the only non-Indigenous person to be affected by the disease was a Native American", and suggested that if the disease was smallpox "it was more likely to have come from the American whalers who came to and went from Sydney Cove prior to and during 1788–1789. No one really knows." Dowling, who does not propose the whaler idea, is not satisfied with any explanation of how smallpox first reached the Sydney region, writing in 2021 that: "no one author or theory has in the end prevailed over the others. The question of the origin of the 1789 smallpox epidemic among the Australian Aboriginal people has remained unresolved."

== History Wars as an influence on the debate ==
The History Wars in Australia involve moralized or politicized debates about injustices that the Aboriginals suffered from European settlers. It is likely that the History Wars have influenced discussions or investigations of smallpox in the colonial era.

The fact that the three main smallpox outbreaks afflicted Aboriginals rather than settlers has not been proved to be due to anyone's deliberate or malicious action. Yet it seems to some Aboriginals symbolic of the many injustices and disadvantages that they have suffered, and (in the view of Dr Mark Wenitong) potentially suspicious. Some Aboriginals, and their supporters, have implied that they feel the pattern of Australian history will be incomplete until evidence can be found that the smallpox outbreaks were in some way a deliberate plot contrived by British colonists. Conversely, some proponents of the Macassan or chickenpox theories imply that they see social value or historical justice in ruling out conspiracy theories. Judy Campbell, for instance, wrote in her book Invisible Invaders that she hoped to assist reconciliation by answering an Aboriginal protester who claimed, "You gave us smallpox". Professor Carmody told a journalist in 2013 that a further reason for doubting that the 1789 plague was smallpox released by the surgeons was that he had read their surviving records and, "They all struck me as being of really ethical character and I simply can't believe any of them would do that."

What is not in doubt is that the early "smallpox" epidemics caused immense injury to Aboriginals, and had major effects upon the balance of power between themselves and the colonists. Each of the three best-substantiated theories about the epidemics may provoke different, yet significant, moral criticisms of the behaviour of the settlers. For instance, if the Macassan theory were proved to be true, and it was Makassars, not Europeans, who brought smallpox to Australia, it would still be true that it was settlers and squatters from Europe who took advantage of smallpox (and other new diseases) to take over Aboriginal lands. However, if it could be proved that British colonial settlement was facilitated in 1789 by a conscious act of germ warfare, the morality and legitimacy of the colonisation of Australia would be more severely questioned.

== Notes ==
=== Sources ===
- Cumpston, J. H. L. (John Howard Lidgett) (1914). The history of small-pox in Australia, 1788-1908. Melbourne: Commonwealth of Australia - Quarantine Service.
- Dowling, Peter (2021). Fatal contact: How epidemics nearly wiped out Australia's first peoples. Clayton, Victoria: Monash University Publishing. ISBN 9781922464460.
