= Quadrant (magazine) =

Australian literary and cultural journal

- Cover of November 2014 issue
- Editor: Rebecca Weisser
- Frequency: Monthly
- Founded: 1956; 70 years ago
- Company: Quadrant Magazine Ltd.
- Based in: Sydney, Australia
- Language: English
- Website: quadrant.org.au
- ISSN: 0033-5002

Quadrant is a conservative Australian literary, cultural, and political journal, which publishes both online and printed editions. As of 2019, Quadrant mainly publishes commentary, essays and opinion pieces on cultural, political, and historical issues, although it also reviews literature and publishes poetry and fiction in the print edition. Its editorial line is self-described "bias towards cultural freedom, anti-totalitarianism and classical liberalism".

== History ==
The magazine was founded in Sydney in 1956 by Richard Krygier, a Polish-Jewish refugee who had been active in social-democrat politics in Europe, and James McAuley, a Catholic poet known for the Ern Malley anti-modernist hoax. It was established in an attempt to counter the increasingly strong national and international influence of the highly successful literary magazine Meanjin, which continues to be Australia's leading literary journal. It was originally an initiative of the Australian Committee for Cultural Freedom, the Australian arm of the Congress for Cultural Freedom, an anti-communist advocacy group funded by the CIA. The name Quadrant was suggested by the publisher Alec Bolton, husband of the poet Rosemary Dobson; she had declined to join the editorial board of Quadrant, not wanting to be seen as "part of the right".

Quadrant has had many notable contributors, including Les Murray, who was its literary editor from 1990 to 2019, Peter Ryan, who wrote a column from 1994 to 2015, Heinz Arndt, Sir Garfield Barwick, Frank Brennan, Ian Callinan, Hal Colebatch, Peter Coleman, Sir Zelman Cowen, Anthony Daniels, Joe Dolce, David Flint, Lord Harris of High Cross, Paul Hasluck, Dyson Heydon, Sidney Hook, A. D. Hope, Barry Humphries, Clive James, John Kerr, Michael Kirby, Frank Knopfelmacher, Peter Kocan, Christopher Koch, Andrew Lansdown, John Latham, Douglas Murray, Patrick O'Brien, Sharon Olds, George Pell, Pierre Ryckmans, Roger Sandall, Roger Scruton, Clement Semmler, Greg Sheridan, James Spigelman, Sir Ninian Stephen, Tom Switzer, and Alexander Voltz, as well as several Labor and Liberal political figures, including Bob Hawke, John Howard, Tony Abbott, Mark Latham, and John Wheeldon. After the publication of the 1997 Bringing Them Home report about the Stolen Generations, Quadrant published a number of articles critical of the report's methodology and conclusions. Professor Robert Manne, who edited the magazine from 1990 to 1997, claimed that the Howard government's response to Bringing Them Home was influenced by and "collusive with" Quadrant's position.

As of 2017, commentators describe the magazine as having a strong right-wing bias and even engaging in extremism. In the week following the Manchester Arena bombing, Quadrant's online editor Roger Franklin wrote an article titled "The Manchester Bomber's ABC Pals", referring to the Q&A TV program. In it he wrote: "Had there been a shred of justice, that blast would have detonated in an Ultimo TV studio [later amended to, 'What if that blast had detonated in an Ultimo TV studio?'] ... none of the panel’s likely casualties would have represented the slightest reduction in humanity’s intelligence, decency, empathy or honesty." ABC Managing director Michelle Guthrie called for the article to "be removed and apologised for". Quadrant editor-in-chief Keith Windschuttle acknowledged that the article was "intemperate" and "a serious error of judgment" and apologised for the offence it had caused. The article was removed from the website.

== Stance and values ==
In October 1992, Dame Leonie Kramer, then the chairman of the magazine's board of directors, discussed the "deep values" of Quadrant:

1. "the intrinsic value of cultural and intellectual freedom and of inquiry ..."
2. "cultural and intellectual freedoms, indeed negative liberties generally, depend upon an abundance of autonomous institutions and an open society ..."
3. "political democracy ... support of particular democratic institutions, and a culture that accepts peaceful and democratic modes of government and change of government ..."
4. "liberal democracy, that is democracy that respects individual liberty ... insists that government be limited: by other holders of political and economic resources, by legally protected private property, by free media, and most of all by the rule of law, that is the restraint and channelling of power by law ..."
5. "the virtues, and commonly the wisdom, borne by traditions in social and moral life ... It has not pretended that traditions have all the answers or should be treated with uncritical reverence ... It has, however, recommended that ... long established moral and social practices be treated with respect and caution."
6. "an economic order in which markets are allowed to work - within the rule of law (and the framework of property rights) - as sources of information, as ingredients and supporters of liberty and as facilitators of competitive private enterprise and individual choice ..."

In 2007, Quadrant's mission was described by its editor as:

To defend the great tradition of free and open debate, to make possible dissent, while at the same time insisting on both civilised discourse and rational argument. This mission is not the same as at Quadrant's founding, but it is not dissimilar. For while the communist dictatorship is no more, the love of anti-democratic dictators still survives among many intellectuals, as does their determination to impose their own strange beliefs on the population as a whole.

In March 2008, the magazine was describing itself as sceptical of "unthinking leftism, or political correctness, and its 'smelly little orthodoxies'". Regular contributors often support conspiracy theories such as that COVID-19 has a mild impact and that global warming is a hoax, and the 2020 US election was fraudulent. As of November 2019, the magazine describes itself as "Australia's most open minded publication", while its home page includes articles critical of climate scientists, the ABC, and "the Left's triumphal anti-clericalism".

== Hoax ==
In January 2009, Quadrant unknowingly published a hoax article. Its author, writer, editor and activist Katherine Wilson, stated that she aimed to show that the magazine and editor Keith Windschuttle had right-wing politics bias. Wilson claimed Windschuttle and Quadrant would publish an inaccurate article and not check its footnotes or authenticity if it met his preconceptions. Using the pseudonym "biotechnologist Dr Sharon Gould", Wilson submitted an article claiming that CSIRO had planned to produce food crops engineered with human genes.

== Editors ==
Order	Period	Editor	Background / comments
1.	1956–1967	James McAuley	Catholic poet
2.	1964–1966	Donald Horne	Writer
3.	1967–1978	Peter Coleman	Writer, journalist, and former New South Wales and Federal Liberal politician
4.	1978–1981	Elwyn Lynn	Artist, author, art critic and curator
5.	1981–1978	Peter Coleman	Writer, journalist, and former New South Wales and Federal Liberal politician
6.	1988–1989	Roger Sandall	Writer, anthropologist, Senior Lecturer at University of Sydney
7.	1990–1997	Robert Manne	Lecturer at La Trobe University; resigned after repeated disputes with the magazine's editorial board
8.	1997–2007	Paddy McGuinness	Journalist and self-described contrarian
9.	2008–2015	Keith Windschuttle	Writer and historian
10.	2015–2017	John O'Sullivan	Political advisor and editor
11.	2017–2024	Keith Windschuttle	Writer and historian
12.	2024–	Rebecca Weisser	Journalist

== Management structure ==
=== Editorial staff ===
- Editor, Quadrant magazine: Rebecca Weisser
- Editor, International, Quadrant magazine: John O'Sullivan
- Editor, Quadrant Online: Roger Franklin
- Literary Editor: Barry Spurr
- Music Editor: Alexander Voltz
- Deputy Editor: George Thomas

== See also ==
- List of literary magazines
- Encounter (UK)
- The Dorchester Review (Canada)
