= Edna Ryan Awards =

Awards for women in NSW or ACT

- Awarded for: Making a feminist difference to women in NSW and ACT, Australia.
- Venue: Sydney Trades Hall
- First award: 1998

The Edna Ryan Awards, also referred to as simply "The EDNAs", were Australian awards established to recognise women who have "made a feminist difference" in New South Wales and Australian Capital Territory. They are named for activist Edna Ryan, after her death in 1998.

== History ==
The inaugural Edna Ryan Awards were held in 1998, the year following the death of their namesake Edna Ryan. Ryan was a life-long feminist, labour movement activist, and mentor and role model for a whole generation of women. The awards were created to honour her life and work by a group of her friends, particularly Eva Cox and other members of the Women's Electoral Lobby (WEL).

Ryan had been closely involved with WEL, particularly the Women in the Workforce group which she convened. WEL hosted and administered the EDNAs from 1998 to 2010, but from 2012 they were administered by The Edna Ryan Awards Committee and hosted by the Australian Services Union (ASU). In 2020 the Older Women's Network (OWN) NSW took over hosting the awards.

Since their inception the awards have recognised many high-profile Australian women for their feminist activity, including Eva Cox, Meredith Burgmann, Susan Ryan, Anne Summers, Wendy McCarthy, Jane Caro, and Sally McManus. Many of the recipients have been tireless advocates for women's rights who worked as community activists over a long period with very little other reward or recognition.

== Eligibility and description ==
Nominees for the awards must be comfortable identifying as a feminist and must live or work in NSW or the ACT as Ryan did during her lifetime. A panel reviews all nominations and the awards are presented on an annual basis at an evening social event.

The award categories can vary but in later years there were awards in many fields, including workforce, government, arts, community activism, media/communications, leadership, mentoring, sport, and education.

The awards are not intended as simply recognition of women who are successful in their own field, but require evidence that their achievements or actions have made a feminist difference by improving the lives and status of women within the community. The "Grand Stirrer Award" is for inciting others to challenge the status quo.

== Grand Stirrer Award Recipients ==
Name	Year
Liza Buckley	2025
Vicki Hodges	2024
Sam Mostyn	2023
Chanel Contos	2022
Brittany Higgins	2021
fEMPOWER	2018
Mehreen Faruqi	2017
Amanda Hill	2016
Tara Moss	2015
Sally McManus	2015
Dorothy McRae-McMahon	2014
Destroy The Joint	2013
Teresa Savage	2012
Rhonda Wilson	2009
Karen Lee Willis	2008
Tegan Wagner	2006
Gerri Greenfield	2005
Anne Summers	2004
Di Graham	2003
Wendy McCarthy	2002
Dorothy Symonds	2002
Robyn Plaister	2001
Jennie George	2000
Joan Bielski	1999
Eva Cox	1998

== Award Recipients–by year (all categories) ==
=== 2023 ===
Name	Category
Sam Mostyn	Grand Stirrer
Deborah Cheetham Fraillon	Arts
Bree van Reyk	Arts
Kristine Hewett	Community Activism
Audrey Mims	Community Activism
Climate Writers: Marlene Baquiran & Eezu Tan	Community Activism
Sarah Rosenberg	Community Activism
Chrystina Stanford	Leadership
Ginger Gorman	Media Communication
Daphne Lowe Kelly	Mentoring
Shirley Randell	Mentoring
Pilar Lopez	Mentoring
Vanessa Donald-Smith	Mentoring
Anne Junor	Workforce
Meg Smith	Workforce
Neelima Kadiyala	Workforce

=== 2022 ===
Name	Category
Chanel Contos	Grand Stirrer
Louise Hislop	Political Activism
Amanda Rose	Leadership
Annie Crowe	Community Activism
Brenda Gaddi	Leadership
Janice Paulson	Mentorship
Jenny Leong	Leadership
Julia Zemiro	Media Communication
Licia Heath	Political Activism
Lorraine Usher	Mentoring
Maha Abdo	Community Activism
Malaika Mfula	Leadership
Rizina Yadav	Leadership
Melina Georgousakis	Mentoring
Natalie Lang	Workforce
Renae Ryan	Workforce
Romy Listo	Leadership
Rosie Herberte	Arts
Sue Edmonds	Arts

=== 2021 ===
Name	Category
Brittany Higgins	Grand Stirrer
Ann Reynolds	Community Activism
Adina Jacobs	Mentoring
Bobbi Mahlab	Mentoring
Catherine Gander	Leadership
Charmaine Huisman	Community Activism
Claire Couson	Arts
Clair Jackson	Arts
Danielle Villafana	Community Activism
Denise Thompson	Media/Communication
Diane Hague	Workforce
Dulce Munoz	Community Activism
Elaine Evans	Leadership
Elizabeth Hill	Workforce
Emily Mayo	Media/Communication
Georgie Dent	Workforce
Hayley Foster	Leadership
Jess Hill	Media/Communication
Jo-Anne Cahill	Arts
Kim Loo	Community Activism
Kittu Randhawa	Leadership
Robynne Murphey	Workforce
Rosell Flatley	Arts
Sunita Gloster	Media/Communication
The Loveys	Arts
Yvette Kinkade	Community Activism

=== 2018 ===
Name	Category
Mary O'Sullivan	Community Activism
Leonie McGuire	Community Activism
fEMPOWER	Grand Stirrer
Lee Lewis	Arts
Pearlie McNeill	Arts
Margot Oliver	Media/Communication
Deborah Brennan	Education
Helen L'Orange	Leadership
Marilyn Hatton	Leadership

=== 2017 ===
Name	Category
Erin Wen Ai Chew	Community Activism
Jude Finch	Community Activism
Lewina Jackson	Community Activism
Simone White	Community Activism
Mary Konstantopoulos	Sport
Mehreen Faruqi	Grand Stirrer
The Baulkham Hills African Ladies Troupe	Arts
Nina Angelo	Arts
Gabriele Jones	Arts
Erika Addis	Media/Communication
End Rape on Campus Australia (EROC)	Education
Hannah Wandel	Education
Rachel Cooper	Workforce
Marion Brown	Leadership

=== 2016 ===
Name	Category
Billi McCarthy-Price and Hannah Massingham	Sport
Amanda Hill	Grand Stirrer
The Women's Library	Arts
Catherine Ordway	Sport
Lina Cabaero	Workforce
Janine Whiteman	Mentoring
Carol Booth and Liz Rickman	Leadership
Sharon McKinnon	Leadership
Darriea Turley	Government
Jozefa Sobski	Education
Jan Breckenridge	Education
Monica Davidson	Media/Communication
Julie Perkins	Community Activism
Jane Davidson	Community Activism
Heidi Zajac	Community Activism

=== 2015 ===
Name	Category
Ashleigh Thomson	Mentoring
Margaret Hickie	Mentoring
Louise Evans	Sport
Chris Ronalds	Leadership
Margaret Henry	Leadership
Sally McManus	Grand Stirrer
Betty Ferguson	Mentoring
Amanda Shalala	Sport
Tara Moss	Grand Stirrer
Finola Moorhead	Arts
Darelle Duncan	Community Activism
Jeannie Sotheran	Community Activism
Saba Vasefi	Community Activism
Anjani Regmi	Community Activism
Frances Crimmins	Leadership

=== 2014 ===
Name	Category
Roxanne McMurray	Leadership
Maeve Marsden	Arts
Vee Malnar	Arts
Lillian Howell Project	Community Activism
Marilyn Forsythe	Workforce
Bronwyn Culling	Mentoring
Lin Cooper	Mentoring
Bush Lemons	Leadership
Marian Baird	Workforce
Hawzhin Azeez	Media/Communication
Kate Rowe	Sport
McKenzie Raymond	Community Activism
Zoya Patel	Media/Communication
Dorothy McRae-McMahon	Grand Stirrer

=== 2013 ===
Name	Category
Suzie van Opdorp	Community Activism
Shirley Kent	Community Activism
Anne Buttsworth	Media/Communication
Maree O'Halloran	Leadership
Kim Rubenstein	Leadership
Destroy The Joint	Grand Stirrer
Ursula Frederick	Arts
Lee Grant	Arts
Rebecca Ordish	Mentoring
Fiona Miller	Mentoring
Wendy Herbert	Education
Dragica Sinikoski	Education
Danielle Warby	Sport
Heather Reid	Sport

=== 2012 ===
Name	Category
Nadia Saleh	Workforce
Sonia Laverty	Workforce
Bronwyn Penrith	Mentoring
Natasa Nikolic	Mentoring
Sylvia Kinder	Mentoring
Teresa Savage	Grand Stirrer
Jenna Price	Media/Communication
Maree McDermott	Community Activism
Bronwyn Bancroft	Arts
Georgina Abrahams	Arts
Cigdem Aydemir	Arts
Jan McDonald	Community Activism

=== 2010 ===
Name	Category
Ludo McFerran	Community Activism
Jennifer Dalitz	Workforce
Kat Armstrong	Battling
Debbie Carstens	Workforce
Shokufeh Kavani	Arts
Sue Salthouse	Community Activism
Nina Funnell	Media/Communication
Frances Plummer	Mentoring
Mary Dimech	Mentoring
Jane Pollard	Education
Dawn Atkinston	Education
Gabe Kavanagh	Community Activism
Rose Campbell	Community Activism
Susan Smith	Community Activism
Maggy Fargo	Community Activism

=== 2009 ===
Name	Category
Edith Weisberg	Education
Charmaigne Weldon	Battling
Ruth Pollard	Media/Communication
Jane Caro	Media/Communication
Rhonda Wilson	Grand Stirrer
Julie Bates	Workforce
Patricia Griffin	Community Activism

=== 2008 ===
Name	Category
Jo Kowalczyk	Workforce
Liz Barlow	Government
Lesley Laing	Education
Jude Irwin	Education
Matina Mottee	Community Activism
Karen Lee Willis	Grand Stirrer
Elaine Odgers Norling	Community Activism
Judy James Bailey	Media/Communication
Beth Eldridge	Community Activism
Christine Sinclair	Community Activism
Tess Brill	Community Activism

=== 2007 ===
Name	Category
Julie Velthuys	Mentoring
Ellie Ellis	Education
Rosemary Kariuki	Community Activism
Muyesser Durer	Battling
Kellie Tranter	Community Activism
Spiderlily Redgold	Media/Communication
Denele Crozier	Community Activism
Libby Silva	Community Activism
Marie Muir	Community Activism
Emily Maguire	Media/Communication
Rosalind Helyard	Education

=== 2006 ===
Name	Category
Liz Ashburn	Arts
Betty Green	Community Activism
Jane Corpuz-Brock	Community Activism
Dorothy Hoddinott	Education
Joy Goodsell	Community Activism
Adele Horin	Media/Communication
Carmel Nola	Media/Communication
Catherine Fox	Media/Communication
Claire Moore (Senator)	Government
Victoria Abigail	Mentoring
Jude Stoddart	Workforce
Rosemary Richards	Workforce
Daphne Baxter	Workforce
Helen Westwood	Community Activism
Marie Coleman	Government
Anne Field	Government
Tegan Wagner	Grand Stirrer
Priscilla Lumsden	Community Activism
Dixie Link-Gordon	Mentoring
Judith Troeth (Senator)	Government
Lyn Allison (Senator)	Government

=== 2005 ===
Name	Category
Merilyn Childs	Workforce
Josephine Conway	Community Activism
Alva Geikie	Community Activism
Nola Cooper	Community Activism
Bronwyn Moye	Government
Gerri Greenfield	Grand Stirrer
Margaret Kirkby	Access to Abortion
Julia Freebury	Access to Abortion
Jacqui Smith	Mentoring
Margaret Alston	Mentoring
Helen Campbell	Media/Communication
Anne-Mason Furnage	Battling
Stefania Siedlecky	Access to Abortion
Trude Kallir	Community Activism
Dorothy Cora	Community Activism

=== 2004 ===
Name	Category
Muriel Hortin	Community Activism
Susan Ryan	Government
Margo Moore	Community Activism
Anne Summers	Grand Stirrer
Lucy Porter	Battling
Phillippa Hall	Workforce
Joan Lemaire	Mentoring
Dominique Hogan-Doran	Workforce
Julie Griffiths	Mentoring

=== 2003 ===
Name	Category
Jean Slarke	Workforce
Denise Ferris	Arts
Di Graham	Grand Stirrer
Roseleen Healy	Arts
Cate Turner	Community Activism
Rebecca Reilly	Workforce
Aileen Beaver	Workforce
Suzan Virago	Workforce
Betty Johnson	Community Activism
Elizabeth O'Brien	Community Activism
Vicki Potempa	Community Activism
Clare Burton	Grand Stirrer
Susan Kendall	Government
Fran Hayes	Workforce

=== 2002 ===
Name	Category
Rachael Oakes-Ash	Humour
Judy Horacek	Humour
Julia Baird	Media/Communication
Kathleen Swinbourne	Government
Elizabeth Dawson	Education
Wendy McCarthy	Grand Stirrer
Dorothy Symonds	Grand Stirrer
Janne Ellen	Community Activism
Joyce Stevens	Mentoring
Betty Little	Battling
Leichhardt Women's Community Health Centre	Community Activism
Jan Roberts	Community Activism
Jill Bruneau	Arts

=== 2001 ===
Name	Category
Kristine Cruden	Government
Robyn Plaister	Grand Stirrer
Erica Lewis	Government
Toni Modafferi	Media/Communication
Merle Highet	Community Activism
Pam Johnston	Community Activism
Maggie Smyth	Mentoring
Shirley Jones	Arts
Chrissie Shaw	Arts
Martha Ansara	Media/Communication
Kathryn McConnochie	Arts
NSW Teachers' Federation (on behalf of 13 women casual teachers)	Workforce
Pat Richardson	Battling
Emma Tom	Humour

=== 2000 ===
Name	Category
Suzanne Bellamy	Arts
Jennie George	Grand Stirrer
Jan Wood	Community Activism
Christine Nixon	Mentoring
Margaret Jones	Battling
Sarah Maddison	Battling
Rae Frances	Workforce

=== 1999 ===
Name	Category
Joan Bielski	Grand Stirrer
Gail Hewison	Arts
Noreen Hewett	Battling
Jane Gardiner	Media/Communication
Helen McDermott	Workforce
Cathy Block	Mentoring
Kate Lavender	Community Activism

=== 1998 ===
Name	Category
Jenny Taylor	Battling
Meredith Burgmann	Humour
Juliet Richter	Lobbyist
Sheryle Bagwell	Media/Communication
Eva Cox	Grand Stirrer
Marlene Arditto	Political Potholder
Julie Compton	Battling
Misha Schubert	Young Woman
Ann Symonds	Government
Sharon Tobin	Workforce
Peggy Hewett	Arts
Lina Cabaero	Workforce
