= List of national anti-doping organizations =

The following organizations are national anti-doping organizations (NADOs) affiliated with the World Anti-Doping Agency (WADA). Each are charged with testing their nation's athletes as well as running anti-doping programmes for all athletes competing at events held within their country's borders. In most nations dedicated agencies exist, though in some the official NADO is an organization with a wider remit such as a National Olympic Committee or government department.

The WADA maintains a list of NADOs on their website.

Country	National Anti-Doping Organization
Albania	National Antidoping Organization of Albania
Algeria	Commission Nationale Anti-Dopage (CNAD)
Andorra	Commission d'État antidopage d'Andorre
Argentina	Comisión Antidopaje Interina – Comité Olímpico Argentino
Armenia	Anti-Doping Department of Republican Sport Medicine and Anti-doping Service Centre
Australia	Sport Integrity Australia (replaced Australian Sports Anti-Doping Authority)
Austria	Nationale Anti-Doping Agentur Austria (NADA)
Azerbaijan	Azerbaijan National Anti-Doping Agency (AMADA)
Bahamas	Bahamas National Anti-Doping Commission
Barbados	National Anti-Doping Commission of Barbados
Belarus	Ministry of Sports and Tourism
Belgium (Brussels)	Joint Communities Commission
Belgium (Flanders)	NADO Flanders
Belgium (French Community)	French Community of Belgium NADO
Belgium (German Community)	Government of the German-speaking Community
Belize	National Anti-Doping Organization of Belize
Benin	Organisation béninoise antidopage
Bermuda	Bermuda Sport Anti Doping Authority
Bosnia and Herzegovina	Agency for Antidoping Control of Bosnia and Herzegovina
Brazil	Autoridade Brasileira de Controle de Dopagem (ABCD)
Brunei Darussalam	Brunei Darussalam Anti-Doping Committee
Bulgaria	Anti-Doping Centre
Burkina Faso	Comité national de lutte contre le dopage ONAD-CNLD
Burundi	ONAD du Burundi
Cambodia	Cambodian Anti-Doping Agency (CADA)
Cameroon	Organisation Camerounaise de Lutte contre le Dopage en Sport (OCALUDS)
Canada	Canadian Centre for Ethics in Sport (CCES)
Chad	Commission nationale de lutte contre le dopage dans le sport (CNLDS)
Chile	Comision Nacional de Control de Dopaje
China	China Anti-Doping Agency (CHINADA)
Taiwan	Anti Doping Commission, Chinese Taipei Olympic Committee
Colombia	COLDEPORTES
Comoros	ONAD (Comores)
Congo	Comité National de lutte contre le dopage
Democratic Republic of Congo	Comité national antidopage congolais
Cook Islands	Medical and Anti-Doping Committee
Costa Rica	Comisión Nacional Antidopaje en el Deporte
Croatia	Croatian Institute for Toxicology and Anti-Doping
Cyprus	Cyprus Anti-Doping Authority
Czech Republic	Anti-Doping Committee of the Czech Republic
Denmark	Anti Doping Denmark (ADD)
Dominica	National Anti-Doping Organization, Inc.
Dominican Republic	Dominican Republic NADO
Ecuador	Organización Nacional Antidopaje de Ecuador (ONADE)
Egypt	Egyptian NADO
El Salvador	Instituto Nacional de los Deportes
Eritrea	Eritrean National Anti-Doping Organization (ENADO)
Estonia	Estonian Anti-Doping Agency
Ethiopia	Ethiopia NADO
Fiji	Drug Free Sport Fiji (DFSF)
Finland	Finnish Antidoping Agency (FINADA)
France	Agence Française de Lutte contre le Dopage
Gabon	Comité National de Lutte et de Prévention du Dopage Gabonais
Georgia	Georgian Anti-Doping Control and Education Agency (GADCEA)
Germany	Nationale Anti Doping Agentur (NADA)
Greece	Hellenic National Council for Combating Doping (ESKAN)
Grenada	Grenada Anti-Doping Organization
Guatemala	Agencia Nacional Antidoping Agency
Guinea	National Fight against Doping Committee
Hong Kong	Hong Kong Anti-Doping Committee
Hungary	Hungarian Anti-Doping Group (HUNADO)
Iceland	NOC of Iceland
India	National Anti-Doping Agency
Indonesia	Indonesia Anti-Doping Organization (IADO)
Iran	Iran NADO
Ireland	Sport Ireland
Israel	Anti-Doping Committee of Israel
Italy	Italian Anti-Doping Department (CONI-NADO)
Ivory Coast	Comité National Lutte Antidopage (CNALD)
Jamaica	Jamaica Anti-Doping Commission (JADCO)
Japan	Japan Anti-Doping Agency
Jordan	Jordan Anti-Doping Organization
Kazakhstan	Kazakhstan National Anti-Doping Centre
Kenya	Anti-Doping Agency of Kenya
South Korea	Korea Anti-Doping Agency
North Korea	Korea Anti-Doping Agency (DPR)
Kuwait	Kuwait Anti-Doping Committee
Latvia	Anti-Doping Committee of the Ministry of Health
Libya	National Anti-Doping Committee
Lithuania	Anti-Doping Agency of Lithuania
Luxembourg	Agence luxembourgeoise antidopage (ALAD)
Malawi	Malawi Anti-Doping Organization
Malaysia	Anti-Doping Agency of Malaysia (ADAMAS)
Maldives	Maldives National Anti-Doping Association (MANADA)
Mali	Commission Nationale de Lutte contre le Dopage
Malta	NADOMALTA
Mauritius	Anti-Doping Unit, Ministry of Youth and Sports, Mauritius
Mexico	Comité Nacional Antidopaje de México
Moldova	National Antidoping Agency of Republic of Moldova
Monaco	Monegasque Anti-Doping Commission
Mongolia	Mongolian National Anti Doping Organization
Montenegro	Montenegro Antidoping Commission
Myanmar	Myanmar Anti-Doping Organization (MADO)
The Netherlands	Anti-Doping Authority Netherlands
New Zealand	Drug Free Sport NZ
Nicaragua	Instituto Nicaragüense de Deportes (I.N.D.)
Niger	Organisation nationale antidopage (ONAD) Niger
Nigeria	Nigerian National Anti-Doping Committee
North Macedonia	National Anti-Doping Commission
Norway	Anti-Doping Norway (ADNO)
Oman	Oman Anti Doping Committee
Pakistan	Anti-Doping Organization of Pakistan (ADOP)
Palau	Palau Anti-Doping Organization
Panama	Instituto Panameño de Deportes
Papua New Guinea	Papua New Guinea Sports Anti-Doping Organization
Peru	Comisión Nacional Antidopaje del Peru
Philippines	Philippine Sports Commission
Poland	Polish Anti-Doping Agency
Portugal	Autoridade Antidopagem de Portugal (ADoP)
Puerto Rico	Anti-Doping Commission of Puerto Rico
Qatar	Qatar National Anti-Doping Commission
Romania	Romanian Anti-Doping Agency (ANAD)
Russia	Russian Anti-Doping Agency (RUSADA)
Samoa	Samoa Anti-Doping Agency
San Marino	Comitato Permanente Antidoping
Saudi Arabia	Saudi Anti-Doping Committee
Senegal	Organisation nationale antidopage du Sénégal
Serbia	Antidoping Agency of Serbia (ADAS)
Seychelles	Seychelles Anti-Doping Commission (SADC)
Singapore	Anti-Doping Singapore
Slovakia	Slovak Anti-Doping Agency (SADA)
Slovenia	Slovenian Anti-Doping Organisation (SLOADO)
South Africa	South African Institute for Drug Free Sport (SAIDS)
Spain	Spanish Anti-Doping Agency (AEPSAD)
Sri Lanka	National Anti-Doping Organisation – Sri Lanka
Sudan	Sudanese Anti-Doping Agency
Suriname	Suriname Anti-Doping Authoriteit (SADA)
Sweden	Swedish Sports Confederation
Switzerland	Antidoping Switzerland
Tunisia	Agence nationale antidopage (ANAD)
Turkey	Turkish Anti-Doping Commission
Ukraine	National Anti-Doping Organization of Ukraine
United Arab Emirates	United Arab Emirates Anti-Doping Committee
United Kingdom	UK Anti-Doping
United States of America	US Anti-Doping Agency (USADA)
Uruguay	Organización Nacional Antidopaje del Uruguay
Vanuatu	Drug Free Sport Vanuatu
Venezuela	Comisión antidopaje de la República Bolivariana de Venezuela
Vietnam	Vietnam Anti-Doping Sports Medecine Agency (VADA)
