= Bon Hull =

Australian feminist activist (1915–2000)

- Born: Jessie Mary Davison; 28 March 1915; Richmond, Victoria
- Died: 16 June 2000 (aged 85); Caulfield, Victoria
- Education: Emily McPherson College of Domestic Economy
- Occupations: Feminist; activist; fashion designer

Jessie Mary (Bon) Hull (28 March 1915 - 16 June 2000) was an Australian feminist activist, born in Richmond, Victoria. She made significant contributions in the early days of the women’s liberation movement in Melbourne, co-founded the Women’s Action Committee in 1970, and participated in many campaigns and actions in support of women's rights.

== Early life and education ==
Jessie Mary ‘Bon’ Hull (1915–2000) was born in Richmond on 28 March 2015 and grew up in Footscray, Victoria. Her parents were Melbourne-born Ruby Pearl, née Bishop, and engine driver Claude Exton Davison, and she had two brothers. Hull attended the local State school and later went to the Emily McPherson College of Domestic Economy in the city, where she learnt dress designing. She worked as a designer in the Melbourne clothing and fashion industry for many years, and later owned and operated a delicatessen. She married twice, had three sons, and was eventually a grandmother to four children. She combined raising a young family with her successful professional and business career, with her public achievements coming later in life, after she separated from her second husband in 1970.

== Activism ==
On 2 March 1970, fellow feminist activists Zelda D’Aprano, Alva Geikie, and Thelma Solomon co-founded the Women's Action Committee (WAC), which gave rise to Melbourne's growing women's liberation movement in the early 1970s. Hull was in her mid-50s when she attended WAC's first meeting. She became an active and enthusiastic founding member of the group, which set out to challenge the patriarchy and improve conditions for all women. WAC provided women with opportunities to meet, encouraged more women to get involved in activism, and campaigned on a variety of feminist issues in Australian society. This led some women to take more militant action in their campaigns, highlighting the inequality of women's pay scales. Hull was involved in most of the radical actions organised by WAC in the early 1970s. This included the Equal Pay Tram Ride in April 1970, where WAC members travelled around Melbourne but only paid 75% of the fares, because women were only receiving 75% of the wage of their male co-workers at the time. The Committee helped arrange Australia's first pro-choice rally in 1975, with a march being attended by more than 500 women. Hull was also involved in the anti-Miss Teenage Quest demonstrations in 1970 and 1971.

Known for her outspokenness and social conscience, Hull was the first Australian woman to go to jail for protesting against the Vietnam War. She was arrested at a demonstration in August 1970 when she intervened after witnessing the brutal treatment of a young woman by police. She was charged with offensive language and resisting arrest. When her subsequent appeal against the convictions failed, she was ordered to pay the fines or go to jail. On 12 November 1970, she began a 20-day jail sentence at Fairlea Women's Prison, after refusing to pay the imposed $100 in fines.

In August 1971, Hull helped to organise the National Women's Liberation Conference on Women and Work and Women and the Trade Unions at Melbourne University. In 1972, Hull was instrumental in establishing the Women’s Liberation Centre on Little Latrobe Street in Melbourne with other WAC members. She was also involved in the establishment of some of the groups that operated there, including the Women's Abortion Action Coalition and the Women's Health Collective. The latter, established in 1974, was a self-help clinic that was a forerunner of today's women's health services. Hull was determined to transform women's healthcare, including the provision of abortion rights and free contraception. She advocated strongly for the repeal of the anti-abortion laws and women's right to control their bodies. In 1973, she helped to establish the Abortion Trust Fund. This was a source of loans for women who would otherwise not have the funds to afford an abortion. In 1980, Hull published In Our Own Hands: A Women’s Health Manual. This book was a resource for readers that provided practical and accessible information on women's health issues, helped to demystify the health system, and enabled women to take greater control of their medical needs.

In 1986, Hull was one of the original campaigners who lobbied to retain Melbourne’s Queen Victoria Hospital at its Lonsdale Street Melbourne location for the women of Victoria. While ultimately unsuccessful in preventing the hospital's demolition and relocation to the Monash Medical Centre in Clayton, she was instrumental in the retention of one of its buildings for the Queen Victoria Women's Centre, which opened in 1996.

== Death and legacy ==
Hull died of heart disease on 16 June 2000 at South Caulfield, at the age of 85. She was survived by her three sons.

On 11 March 2004, Hull was inducted posthumously into the Victorian Honour Roll of Women and noted for dedicating her time and energy to the cause of women's liberation.

== Archives ==
The Papers of Bon Hull, formerly held by the Victorian Women's Liberation and Lesbian Feminist Archives, are now held by the University of Melbourne Archives. The Papers of Alva Geikie, held by the State Library of Victoria, also include articles by and about Bon Hull.

A folder of publications, The birth control industry, circa 1977, created by Hull, is included in the Carmel Shute collection at the State Library of Victoria. The State Library of South Australia holds the letters Hull wrote to her friend Barbara Polkinghorne. In these letters, Hull writes about women's health issues, the health care system, and her views on prostitution. A letter Hull wrote to the Minister for Health in 1977, Ralph Hunt, questioning the use of PGF2a in terminating pregnancies, is also included.

== Publications ==
- Hull, Bon. In Our Own Hands : A Women’s Health Manual. Melbourne: Hyland House, 1980. ISBN 0908090242
- Hull, Bon n.d. 'Women's rights and choices in healthcare. Address to the Women's Health Conference (1986: Launceston)' Iris (Hobart), no. Spring 1986, pp. 10–15.
