= Edna Ryan (activist) =

Australian activist

- Born: Edna Minna Nelson; 15 December 1904; Pyrmont, New South Wales
- Died: 10 February 1997 (aged 92); Canberra, Australian Capital Territory
- Occupations: Trade unionist, writer
- Known for: Labour movement activism, equal pay for women
- Relatives: Lyndall Ryan (daughter)

Edna Minna Ryan, née Nelson (15 December 1904 – 10 February 1997) was an Australian feminist and labour movement activist and writer, and a role model and mentor to a whole generation of women. Mary Owen (feminist, unionist, and activist) wrote that she "may not have been the most outstanding woman in the women's movement but she has probably done more to improve the status of Australian women than any other person this century." For former Senator Susan Ryan (no relation): "She was the most inspiring and admirable woman I have known."

== Biography ==
Edna was born in Pyrmont. She became politically active early in life, participating in the marches through the streets of Sydney associated with General Strike of 1917 when she was still a High School student. She was involved in the first International Women's Day in Sydney in 1928, and in the labour movement as an organiser of the wives of timber workers during the Timber Workers' strike of 1929. In the 1920s she was a member of the Communist Party of Australia and the Industrial Workers of the World (IWW), but by 1935 she had joined the Australian Labor Party. In 1956 she was elected to Fairfield Municipal Council, becoming New South Wales' first female deputy mayor in 1958. She was a member of Fairfield Council and its successor Prospect County Council until her retirement in 1972.

On her retirement from the workforce she became a member of the Women's Electoral Lobby, attending it foundational conference in 1973. In WEL she devoted most of her activity to women in the paid work force. Her intervention on WEL's behalf in the national Minimum Wage case at the Conciliation and Arbitration Commission in Melbourne in 1974, supplied data on the number of solo female breadwinners in Australia. This information had never before presented to an industrial tribunal, and was instrumental in the decision by Judge Terry Winter to equalise the female Minimum Wage with the male award, which was another essential step in establishing the principal of 'equal pay for work of equal value' in the Australian wage system.

She was also instrumental in WEL's subsequent submission on Maternity Leave.

Edna died in Canberra in 1997.

== Legacy ==
Edna Ryan Awards (The Ednas)

The Edna Ryan Awards, also known as "the Ednas", were created in 1998 by a group of her friends and the NSW Women's Electoral Lobby to honour her life and work and to acknowledge the contributions by other women that make a feminist difference. The Edna Ryan awards have categories for:

- leadership
- mentoring
- workplace
- community activism
- arts and culture, and
- media and communication, and
- "Grand Stirrer"

Notable winners have included Brittany Higgins (Grand Stirrer), Our Bodies Our Choices, Ann Reynolds (Community Activism), Georgie Dent, fEMPOWER, Mary O'Sullivan, Deborah Brennan (Education), Mehreen Faruqui (Grand Stirrer, 2017), Mary Konstantopoulos, and Amanda Hill (Grand Stirrer, 2016).

== Publications ==
Together with Anne Conlon she researched and wrote the first history of the long agitation for Equal Pay in Australia, published in 1975 as Gentle Invaders: Australian Women and the Workforce 1788–1974. She subsequently researched and wrote Two-thirds of a Man: Women and Arbitration in New South Wales 1902–08, published in 1984.

== Honours ==
In 1985 Edna Ryan was awarded an honorary Doctorate of Letters by the University of Sydney. She received another honorary doctorate in 1995 from Macquarie University.
