= Catherine Ordway =

Catherine Ordway is an Australian lawyer and academic publishing and commentating on sport integrity issues.

== Personal ==
Ordway grew up in Whyalla, South Australia. She competed a Bachelor of Arts and Law double degree at the University of Adelaide and Graduate Diploma of Legal Practice at the University of South Australia. She lived at St Ann’s College from 1989 to 1990. In 2009, she completed at Graduate Diploma of Investigations Management at Charles Sturt University. In 2019, she completed a PhD at the University of Canberra with the thesis titled Protecting Sports Integrity: Sport Corruption Risk Management Strategies.

Ordway has played several sports at a competitive level including: Australian squad member in the Olympic sport of handball, representing the Australian Capital Territory in rugby union, and fencing at intervarsity level.

== Legal and academic career ==
Ordway's move in sports law and integrity commenced following winning the Australian and New Zealand Sports Law Association First Time Presenter’s [now Paul Trisley] Prize for her first anti-corruption paper, titled “Who will represent Australia at the 2000 Olympics? Case Study – Handball” in 1996. In 1997, Ordway was employed as a solicitor (and later promoted to Senior Associate) with Browne & Co, where she worked on Australian Olympic Committee matters including anti-doping and intellectual property. After the Sydney 2000 Olympic Games, Ordway moved to Oslo to work for the Anti-Doping and Ethics Department of the Norwegian Olympic Committee and Confederation of Sports [NIF], which became Anti-Doping Norway (2001-2005). Ordway then moved to Doha, Qatar to head up the Doping Control program for 2006 Asian Games Organising Committee [DAGOC]. She returned to Canberra, Australia to take up the Group Director, Enforcement, and later, the Group Director, Detection, roles with the Australian Sports Anti-Doping Authority (2006-2008).

Ordway's expertise has led to being a consultant to the Rio 2016 Olympic Games Bid, the Budapest 2024 Olympic Games Bid, and the Gold Coast 2018 Commonwealth Games. Ordway has served on numerous tribunals, ethics, vetting, and anti-doping committees in Australia and internationally including for the World Anti-Doping Agency (WADA) Social Science Research Expert Advisory Group, International Cricket Council, the World Curling Federation, International Canoe Federation, World Badminton Federation, International Federation of Horseracing Authorities, Asian Racing Federation, the World Baseball-Softball Confederation, SportAccord, International Boxing Association, and the West Indies Cricket Board.

Ordway expertise is utilised by several universities in Australia:

- Senior Fellow at the University of Melbourne, having developed and lectured in Sports Integrity and Investigations from 2014-2024.
- Delivering sports management and sports law courses at the University of Canberra since 2018 and was Sport Integrity Research Lead & Associate Professor from 2022 to 2025.
- Lecturing sports management and sports law courses at La Trobe University and the University of New South Wales.

Ordway with Mel Jones and Emma Staples played a critical role in organising and funding ways for the Afghanistan Women’s Cricket team to flee their country in 2021 and safely evacuate to Australia. They received the 2025 MCC Spirit of Cricket Award for assisting the evacuation.

== Published works ==
Ordway has published extensively and her notable works include: Restoring Trust in Sport: Corruption Cases and Solutions by edited by Catherine Ordway (London, Routledge, 2021) and regular articles in The Conversation.

== Recognition ==
- 1996 – Australian and New Zealand Sports Law Association Conference Paper Award (Now Paul Trisley Award)
- 2016 – Edna Ryan Award for her long-term commitment to promoting women in sport
- 2025 – Awarded the MCC Spirit of Cricket Award, Marylebone Cricket Club (MCC)
- 2025 – Inaugural ACT Australian Lawyers Alliance’s (ALA) Civil Justice Award
