= Mary Owen (activist) =

Australian unionist and activist

Mary Owen (activist) OAM
- Born: Mary Evans; 8 February 1921; Balwyn, Victoria, Australia
- Died: 23 March 2017 (aged 96)
- Occupations: feminist, unionist and activist

Mary Owen (née Evans) (8 February 1921 – 23 March 2017) was an Australian feminist, unionist, and activist.

== Personal and early life ==
Owen was born in Balwyn, Victoria in 1921 to Tyrrell and Mary Evans (née Withers), granddaughter to Walter Withers, a landscape painter and member of the Heidelberg School. Her mother died when she was sixteen months old, following the birth of her twin sisters. Owen's godmother, her mother's sister Margery, taught her how to sew. Her father remarried and had three more children, making Owen the eldest of five. She attended girls' schools Korowa and Lauriston. She left school at fifteen and worked as a typist, a clerk, and an editor.

Owen married Richard Owen in 1942 at twenty-one years old. She had her first child Rosemary in 1947, followed by Wendy in 1950, and David in 1953. By 1967 she had separated from her husband, and was granted divorce in 1973.

== Career ==
Owen's first job after having children was working part-time with the Electrical Supply and Service Company (ESCO). She worked door-to-door selling Supermix food processors, before returning to office duties.

From 1965 to 1975, she was on the staff of the Association of Architects, Engineers, Surveyors and Draughtsmen of Australia. Owen was responsible for advertising, layout, and proofreading editorial for their journal, Blueprint. Through this job, she was exposed to the working conditions of women and the union movement. She successfully argued that her work made her eligible for membership of the Australian Journalists Association, and a sub-editor's salary.

Her first venture into politics was in 1969 when she joined the Progressive Reform Party, founded by Bertram Wainer, offering her typing and shorthand skills, taking minutes, and writing policy proposals.

Owen was finally convinced to join the Women's Electoral Lobby beginning in 1972, after previously stating in 1969 that she didn't believe in separate female groups. She represented the Lobby on many government committees, making a significant impact on policies advancing the status of women, especially the fight of equal pay. Owen assisted Edna Ryan in making a WEL submission on a minimum wage for women to the National Wage Case in Melbourne.

Owen co-founded with Sylvie Shaw the Working Women's Centre in Melbourne in 1975. The Centre's charter included equal opportunities for women to work, free of discrimination and with equal pay. They paid special attention to the needs of women from ethnic communities, as well as demanding paid parental leave, removal of abortion restrictions, more sex education and birth control access, a 35 hour work week, and community-based childcare. They successfully lobbied unions and government for funding to continue this work for six years, before the organisation merged into the Australian Council of Trade Unions in 1986.

Owen regularly represented the Women's Electoral Lobby at Melbourne Press Club lunches in the 1970s, her confronting questions earning her a reputation for her tenacity and enthusiasm. Owen campaigned for many issues during her lifetime, including abortion law reform, services for older women and women with disabilities. She was a founding member of Emily's List in Australia.

=== Education ===
After the Whitlam government made tertiary education free, in 1974 in her mid 50s, Owen enrolled in a Bachelor of Arts degree at Melbourne University, majoring in psychology and politics. She completed full time work and advocacy commitments alongside study, graduating with her degree in 1986. Owen was a member of La Trobe University Council from 1983 to 1990, and was appointed Deputy Chancellor of La Trobe University in 1989.

=== Mary Owen Dinners ===
Owen insisted on remaining as coordinator of WWC until 1986 when she turned 65, despite some pressure to retire. The day before that birthday a dinner was held at Hawthorn Town Hall to celebrate her achievements, with 540 women inside and a further 200 turned away. This was the beginning of the Mary Owen dinners when an event was organised the next year for those women who had missed out. These dinners were held in Mary's name and attracted hundreds of women including premiers, public servants, and organisational leaders. There was always a female keynote speaker and the women would dress in the feminist colours of green, white, and purple to celebrate the changing status of women. The last dinner was held in 2005.

Owen was awarded the Queen's Silver Jubilee Medal in 1977 and the Medal of the Order of Australia in 1984. She was added to the Victorian Honour Roll of Women in 2001.

Owen continued her work for women's rights long after retirement with activities for the Older Women's Network, Women With Disabilities, Rationalists, Retired Unionists, Meals on Wheels, and the National Women's Archive project. She died on 23 March 2017, at age 96.

== Publications ==
=== Books ===
- Owen, Mary and Shaw, Sylvie (eds), Working Women: Discussion papers from the Working Women's Centre, Melbourne, Sisters Publishing, Carlton South, VIC, 1979.
- Owen, Mary (1980). "The Political Participation of Women". In Evans, Gareth & Reeves, John (ed.). Labor Essays 1980. Richmond, Victoria: Drummond Publishing, on behalf of the Australian Labor Party.

=== Conference papers ===
- Owen, Mary, 'Stress in the Workplace', in National Status of Women Committee (ed.), Work and Health: Issues in Occupational Health: Proceeings of the Occupational Health in Women in Technological Change Conference, Melbourne, 1982.

=== Journal articles ===
- Owen, Mary, 'I confess I'd rather work for a few reforms', Vashti: Journal of Women's Liberation Movement, April, 1977.
- Owen, Mary, 'Discrimination - what does it mean?', Journal of the Australasian Meat Industry Employees' Union, October, 1978.
- Owen, Mary, 'Why have a Working Women's Centre?', Blueprint: Journal of the Association of Architects, Engineers, Surveyors and Draughtsmen of Australia, August, 1979.
- Owen, Mary, 'What Choice for Women?', Social Alternatives, vol. 1, no. 4, April 1979, pp. 31–37.
- Owen, Mary, 'What came out of Copenhagen? The definition and relevance of education for women in developing countries', Journal of the Institute of Secretaries, 1980.
- Owen, Mary, 'The Working Women's Centre', Radical Education Dossier, Autumn, 1981.
- Owen, Mary, 'Making Affirmative Action Work', IMPA Bulletin: Journal of the Institute of Personnel Management Australian Inc. Victoria Division, July, 1984.
- Owen, Mary, 'Women: a wastefully exploited resource', Search (Sydney), vol. 15, no. 9-10, Oct/Nov 1984, pp. 271–275.
- Owen, Mary, 'Edna Minna Ryan', Australian Rationalist, no. 43 Autumn-Winter, 1997.
