= Joan Bielski =

Australian women's rights activist

Joan Bielski AO
- Joan Margaret Bielski in 1988 wearing her Officer of the Order of Australia
- Born: Joan Margaret Bielski; 27 November 1923
- Died: 17 August 2012 (aged 88)
- Occupation: Activist

Joan Margaret Bielski, AO, (27 November 1923 – 17 August 2012) was an Australian activist for equality for women in employment, education and public life.

== Early life ==
Born at Narrabri, New South Wales (NSW) to banker Francis Ward and Doris (née Bull). The family moved to Armidale where Bielski attended St Patrick's Convent and later completed her intermediate certificate at St Mary's Convent in Gunnedah.

== Career ==
Bielski graduated from the University of Sydney in 1949 and became a History, English and Economics teacher with the NSW Department of Education until 1974.

In 1972 Bielski was a founding member of the Women's Electoral Lobby (WEL) and also of the NSW Women in Education group (1973–1994).

On her retirement from teaching in 1974 Bielski spent three years as principal research officer to the Royal Commission on Human Relationships. In 1977 she was appointed head of the NSW Ministry of Education's Social Development Unit.

== Awards and recognition ==
In the 1989 Australia Day Honours, Bielski was appointed a Member of the Order of Australia (AM), for "service to the development of equal opportunities for women and girls, particularly in education".

At the second Edna Ryan Awards in 1999 she was named the Grand Stirrer.

The 2004 Queen's Birthday Honours saw her promoted to Officer of the Order of Australia (AO), for "service to the community, particularly through programs to encourage women's participation in political life and through continued contributions to the principles of equal opportunity, access to education and social reform".

== Publications ==
- Women Engineers, Redress Press, 1988, ISBN 1875274014
- Coming to the Party? Women Into Politics, 1994, ISBN 0646200852
- A Women's Charter for Political Reform 2001. A charter for political equality for women and for good government for all Australian citizens, Women Into Politics, 2001, ISBN 1864086823
- The History, Organisation and Achievements of WEL NSW, Women's Electoral Lobby NSW Inc., 2005, ISBN 0909358249
- "Fear and Loathing in the Fifties", chapter in Dirty Secrets: Our ASIO Files, edited by Meredith Burgmann, NewSouth Publishing, 2014, ISBN 9781742231402

== Personal ==
Bielski married Jerzy (George) Stefan Bielski in 1953. He was born in Stockholm in 1921 to Polish parents and survived four years in Auschwitz. After being liberated he migrated to Australia in 1949. George died in 2009. Bielski died in 2012 following a massive stroke.
