= Betteridge =

Betteridge is a surname. Notable people with the surname include:

- Alice Betteridge (1901–1966), Australian deafblind woman
- Kelly Betteridge (born 1969) British Anglican priest
- Lois Betteridge (1928–2020), Canadian silversmith, goldsmith, designer and educator
- Lois Betteridge (canoeist) (born 1997), Canadian slalom canoeist
- Maurice Betteridge (1927–2020), Australian historian
- Mick Betteridge (1924–1999), British footballer
- Ollie Betteridge (born 1996), British ice hockey player
- Robyn Betteridge (born 2011), English child actress

== See also ==
- Betteridge's law of headlines
