= Destroy The Joint =

Australian feminist group

Destroy The Joint (DTJ) is an online Australian feminist group, founded in 2012 by Sydney Morning Herald writer Jenna Price, after 2GB broadcaster Alan Jones criticised then Prime Minister Julia Gillard and stated that women were "destroying the joint". DTJ's main project “Counting Dead Women”, which is organised through the group's Facebook page, aims to track how many Australian women die each year due to violence. The group also uses its platform to build an online community for those concerned with violence against women. Members of the group are known as "Destroyers".

== Origins of Destroy The Joint ==
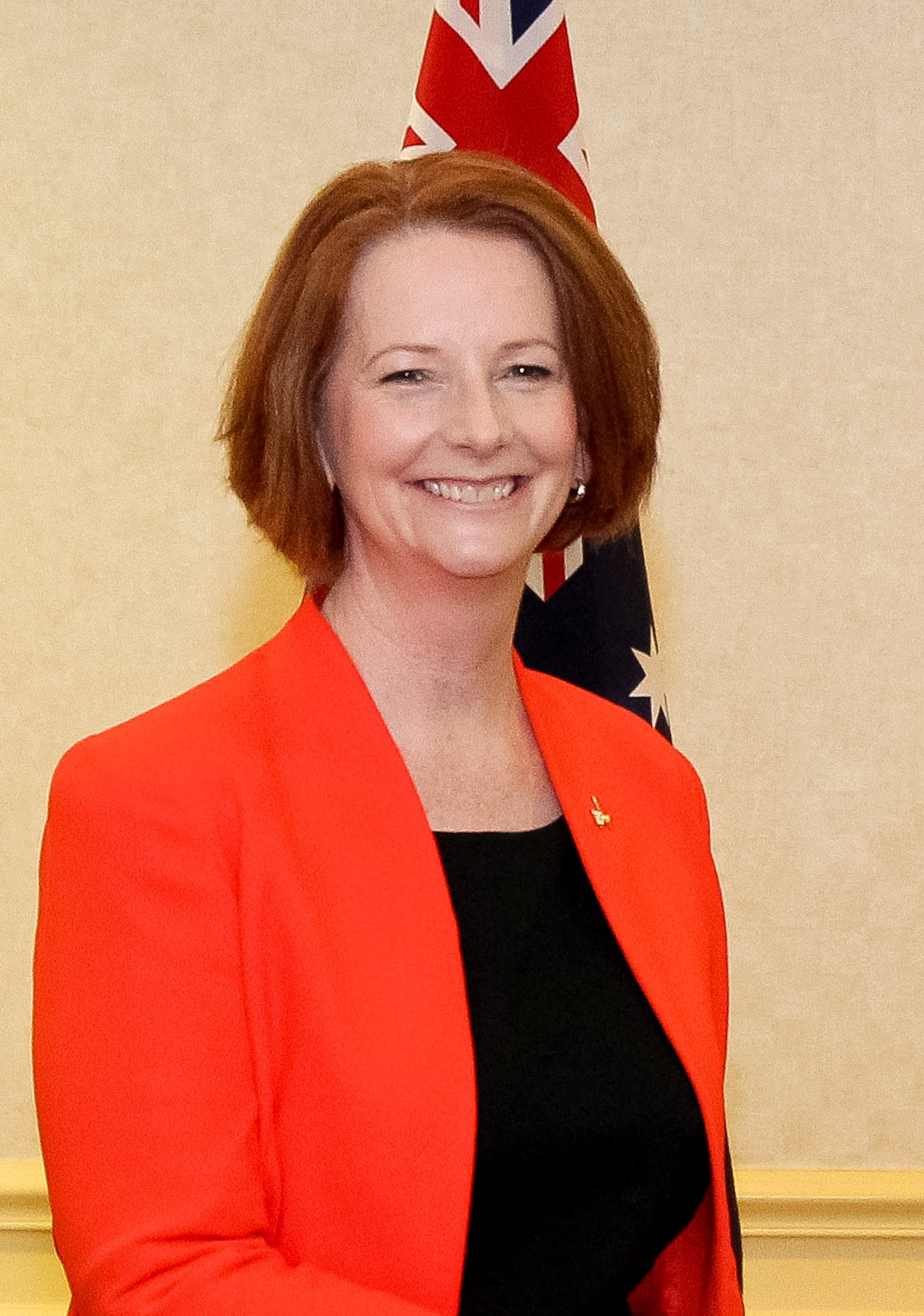
Julia Gillard

=== Alan Jones' criticism of Julia Gillard ===
On August 31, 2012 Alan Jones stated, "She [the Prime Minister] said that we know societies only reach their full potential if women are politically participating. Women are destroying the joint — Christine Nixon in Melbourne, Clover Moore here. Honestly." during an interview he was conducting with then deputy leader of the National Party Barnaby Joyce; who at the time was in opposition. The topic of conversation was the funds for education in developing nations which Gillard had given a green light to; Joyce was of the view that this was a "waste of money".

This was not the first time that the broadcaster had used inflammatory language when discussing Julia Gillard on his radio show; in 2011 Jones stated that the then Prime Minister "should be thrown in the sea in a chaff bag", for which he was referred to the industry watchdog. In 2012 Jones stated that Gillard's father had "died of shame" during speech at a dinner for the University of Sydney's Young Liberals. This criticism of Gillard was cited during her now famous "Misogyny Speech".

==== Other criticisms during Gillard's prime ministership ====
Destroy The Joint was founded when Australia had its first female prime minister, Julia Gillard. At the beginning of her tenure as Prime Minister the media reported that Australia welcomed and was happy to have a woman at the helm, with many outlets stating that sexism in Australia was now over as any gendered barrier to getting the "top job" was now overcome. However, over time the reporting around Gillard changed in tone, particularly after it was leaked that she had opposed two key reforms for paid parental leave. She was criticised for being out of touch as she was childless.

Eventually the press began to report on Gillard's appearance and criticised her for taste in clothes, haircut, weight, figure and her status as an unmarried and childless woman. In 2011 the criticism of Gillard was focused around the carbon tax and the slogans made up by the opposition calling for Australians to "Ditch the Witch".

It is suggested by academics that media criticism of Gillard was gendered as she did not adhere to the traditional gender roles. Gillard has stated that no man would have been treated the same way she was by the press.

=== Creation of #DestroyTheJoint and Facebook page ===
After seeing the comments made by Jones on 31 August 2012, Jane Caro tweeted "Got time on my hands tonight so thought I'd come up with new ways to destroy the joint" in response. In doing so, she sparked the hashtag #DestroyTheJoint, first created by Jill Tomlinson as a satirical response to Jones' and Barnaby Joyce's comments on women in politics. The hashtag trended on Twitter for four days. Subsequently the Facebook page was formed by Sally McManus (Jane Caro, however, states that Jenna Price was the creator of the Facebook page.); as of 2019 the page had more than 98,000 likes.

=== Organisation ===
Destroy The Joint is active across Twitter and Facebook. It is a volunteer-run group made up of administrators and moderators. Unlike traditional organisations and not-for-profit groups the group has no leader, CEO or figurehead; it is run collaboratively.

==== Community ====
Members of the group do not necessarily identify as feminists. What they share in common is the awareness of the presence and impact of sexism and misogyny in society. They share a desire to do something about it.

Destroy The Joint is said to have revitalised feminism in a new medium which is interactive and gives a platform for women to engage in activism in a creative way, which is broad yet unifying. Many have said that the community has given them the confidence to speak up and ask for raises and that they feel a sense of solidarity and that they are not alone; this has been particularly felt among survivors of sexual assault.

== Activism ==
=== Purpose ===
Destroy The Joint was initially a response to the criticism that Julia Gillard received but then grew to be a collective which focused on contemporary feminist issues in Australia. It has since spread to a feminist Facebook page, a space to build a community and have discussions about sexism and misogyny. Over the years it has developed into an online activist space which has calls to action similar to activist group GetUp!. Destroy The Joint has launched campaigns such as "Counting Dead Women".

=== Campaign against Alan Jones ===
After the "died of shame" controversy in 2012, Destroy The Joint contributed over 110,000 signatures to an online petition and embarked on a letter writing campaign in order to push businesses to pull their advertisements from Alan Jones' radio time slot, which ended up costing 2GB $80,000 per day. It has been suggested that the boycott of Jones and the surge of support by the public gave Gillard the confidence to make her "Misogyny Speech".

=== Counting dead women ===
Destroy The Joint keeps track of the number of Australian women who have died due to violence and publishes this number on their Facebook page. The purpose of this is to not only raise awareness about the number of women who lose their lives to violence but also to keep the conversations surrounding these deaths going and eventually push for a national register to be made so that there are official statistics and data available for those who advocate for victims of domestic violence.

=== Silent phone numbers ===
In 2013, Destroy the Joint received correspondence from a survivor of domestic violence who reported that in order for her to have a silent number she needed to pay $36 per year despite being in severe financial hardship after relocating to escape her abuser, on whom she had taken out an apprehended violence order. Destroy the Joint began pushing for a change to the Telecommunications Act 1997 so that those fleeing domestic violence situations can have a silent phone number at no additional cost.

In the case of the survivor who wrote to Destroy The Joint, the group was able to successfully argue the case for waiving the cost of a silent number through emails to Telstra's CEO. This set a precedent for all survivors of domestic violence suffering financial hardship to have the silent number fee waived on a case-by-case basis.

=== Protecting Bangladeshi textile workers ===
After the Rana Plaza collapse in April 2013, Destroy The Joint teamed up with other advocacy groups such as the Textile Clothing and Footwear Union of Australia, Australian Unions, Oxfam and Ethical Work in July 2013 to push for Australian clothing companies to sign the Bangladesh Accord which would protect textile workers. After a six-month campaign 80 companies signed the Bangladesh Accord.

== Criticism of Destroy The Joint ==
=== Non-inclusivity of disabled women ===
In November 2015 it was reported that the moderators of Destroy The Joint had declined to assist in promoting White Flower Memorial, a memorial for disabled victims of violence, abuse and neglect, stating that the event did not align with their activism as it was not specifically about women and that the organisers should look elsewhere to raise awareness for their event.

Disability activist Sam Connor, who had sent the request, was subsequently blocked from the group's Facebook page for asking why disabled women were not part of their activism, seeing as Destroy The Joint's purpose is to speak up for female victims of violence; Connor was reported for being “abusive”.

The same weekend Destroy The Joint had asked for responses to the hashtag #beingawoman; however, when they received responses from disability activists sharing their experiences of being disabled women, they deleted them, stating that the comments were “repetitive, circular and off topic”, and eventually banned these women from the Facebook page, stating that they were "spamming this post and page with a large number of obvious half truths and distortions".

This prompted others to comment and begin a discussion about why disabled women were being excluded from Destroy The Joint's activism.

Following several comments by members of the group and disability activists, Destroy The Joint issued an apology stating that they would unban the women they had banned, review their processes and look to being more inclusive in their activism and that they were committed to "honor victims of gendered violence".

Despite the apology the criticism of the group continued, as there had been no further communication or discussion between Destroy The Joint and the disability activists, and also on the grounds that a Royal Commission had been requested that very week by Greens senator Rachel Siewert who chaired the parliamentary inquiry into the abuse of people with disabilities in institutional settings.

=== Armchair activism ===
One of the early criticisms of the group was that despite having success in terms of being able to mobilise activists to a cause, Destroy The Joint was not doing enough to actually change legislation and regulatory practices, or contribute to policy changes by making submissions to different branches of government.

Conservative columnists also criticised Destroy The Joint as being an online community without focus that could descend into being nothing more than online outrage.

=== Other controversy ===
In 2012 Andrew Bolt accused Destroy the Joint of not being a legitimate activist group and instead being a front for leftist politician and union movements, as Australian Trade Unionist Sally McManus had set up the Facebook group. This was disputed by Jenna Price, who stated that Destroy The Joint is a grassroots movement, and that while individuals who were involved in politics were members of the group, this was separate to the group's activism, and that the two should not be conflated.

== Destroy The Joint in other media ==
=== Destroying The Joint ===
In April 2013 Destroying The Joint was published by University of Queensland Press. This book, edited by Jane Caro, is a collection of essays from prominent Australian women such as Senator Christine Milne, Senator Penny Wong, Wendy Harmer and Clementine Ford discussing the Destroy The Joint movement and speaking to the general issue of sexism and misogyny.

==== List of contributors ====
- Steph Bowe (author)
- Dr Leslie Cannold (writer/public speaker)
- Dr Abby Cathcart (Senior Lecturer, Queensland University of Technology)
- Destroy The Joint administrators
- Catherine Deveny (comedian/author/social commentator/broadcaster)
- Monica Dux (writer/social commentator)
- Lily Edelstien (student/artist)
- Clementine Ford (writer/broadcaster)
- Catherine Fox (journalist/author/public speaker)
- Nina Funnell (writer/social commentator/activist)
- Corinne Grant (TV presenter/columnist/author)
- Wendy Harmer (author/broadcaster)
- Susan Johnson (author)
- Krissy Keen (author)
- Michelle Law (writer)
- Dr Carmen Lawrence (politician)
- Melissa Lucashenko (writer)
- Paula McDonald (professor)
- Emily Maguire (author)
- Dannielle Miller (co-founder & CEO, Enlighten Education)
- Jennifer Mills (author)
- Christine Milne (Senator)
- Tara Moss (author/journalist/model)
- Jenna Price (journalist/academic)
- Yvette Vignando (parenting commentator)
- Penny Wong (Senator)
- Stella Young (comedian/disability advocate/editor)

== See also ==
- Australian politics
- Feminism
- Domestic violence
- Hashtag activism
- Internet activism
- Radical feminism
- Women in politics
