= Jenna Price =

Australian journalist and academic

- Born: 1957-04-10
- Awards: Edna Ryan Award

Academic background
- Education: University of Technology Sydney
- Alma mater: University of Sydney
- Thesis: Destroying the joint: A case study of feminist digital activism in Australia and its account of fatal violence against women (2019)
- Influences: Ariadne Vromen

Jenna Price is an Australian journalist and academic. As of 2021, she is a visiting fellow at the Australian National University and a columnist at The Sydney Morning Herald . She is one of the founders of the online feminist movement, Destroy The Joint.

== Education and career ==
Price graduated with a BA in communications from the NSW Institute of Technology (now University of Technology, Sydney – UTS) in 1981. She also holds an MA from UTS (2013), where she worked as lecturer for some years. She received a PhD from the University of Sydney in 2019. Her thesis, "Destroying the joint: A case study of feminist digital activism in Australia and its account of fatal violence against women", is a history and assessment of the online feminist movement, Destroy The Joint, which she co-founded in 2012.

While a student in the early 1980s, she worked as editorial assistant for Listening Post, the magazine published by volunteer radio station 2SER-FM.

She joined The Sydney Morning Herald in February 1982. In 1984 she worked on the first edition of The Sydney Morning Herald Good Food Guide, edited by Leo Schofield and David Dale. In the mid-1990s, Price was writing on women's and human rights issues for The Canberra Times.

Price was awarded an Edna Ryan Award for Media/Communication in 2012.

She wrote the "2019 Women for Media Report: 'You can't be what you can't see'" for Women's Leadership Institute Australia.
