= French Anti-Doping Agency =

Independent sport authority in France

Agence française de lutte contre le dopage
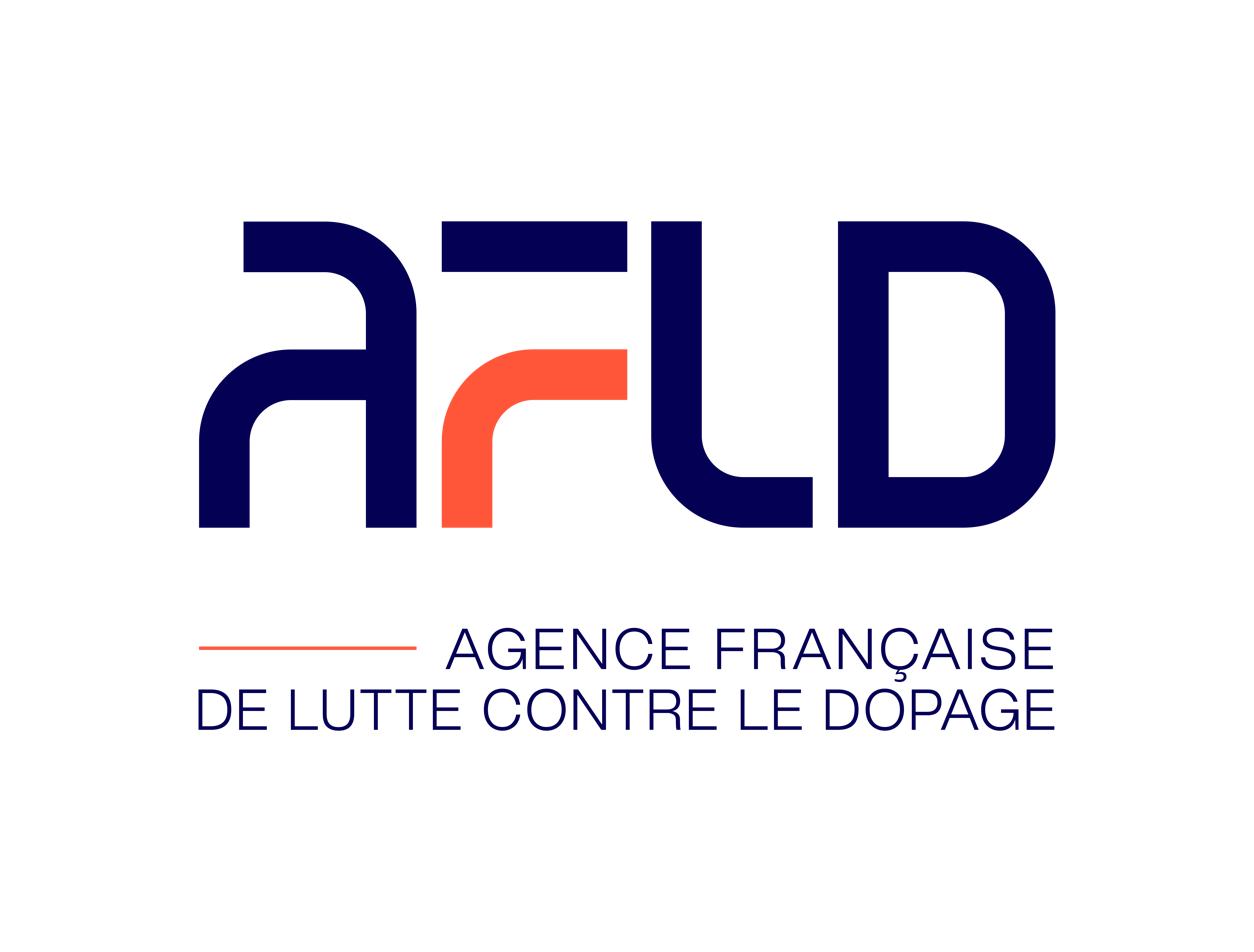
- Abbreviation: AFLD
- Formation: 2006
- Headquarters: 8 rue Auber 75009 Paris
- Official language: French
- President: Dominique LAURENT
- Secretary General: Jérémy ROUBIN
- Staff: 45
- Website: https://www.afld.fr/

The French Anti-Doping Agency (French: Agence française de lutte contre le dopage, AFLD) is an independent public authority formed in 2006 and charged with ensuring that participants in sports in France do not violate rules regarding doping.

As a national anti-doping organization (NADO), the AFLD cooperates with the World Anti-Doping Agency (WADA) and with other signatory organizations of the World Anti-Doping Code such as international sports federations.

The agency has been particularly prominent in cases involving the Tour de France, such as that of Floyd Landis, who was stripped of his title in the 2006 race.

A breakdown in the relationship between AFLD and the Union Cycliste Internationale in relation to testing procedures in the 2009 Tour de France lead to the severance of the role which gave AFLD their highest profile cases.

== AFLD Departments ==
- Testing Department
- Department of legal and institutional affairs
- Intelligence and investigation department
- Education and prevention

== Assignments ==
=== Anti-Doping testing programs ===
The AFLD defines an annual control program based on an assessment of doping risks by discipline and implements it on French territory during sports competitions but also outside competition periods, during training or at the athletes' residency.

=== Investigations ===
The AFLD carries out investigations and collects information in order to seek out or note, violations of the anti-doping rules which do not come under an abnormal analytical result (administration or trafficking of doping products, falsification control).

=== Education ===
AFLD defines, jointly with the World Anti-Doping Agency, an education plan for athletes, in particular those at national and international level, and their support staff (coaches, doctors, etc.). The actions undertaken within the framework of the education program are provided by educators approved by the Agency.

=== Disciplinary Authority ===
In case of a positive test for a prohibited substance or method or a suspected violation of one or more other anti-doping rules, AFLD can apply disciplinary authority through the board of the agency. In this context, the prosecuted athlete can acknowledge the anti-doping rule violation and accept the consequences, without examination of his case by the AFLD Sanctions Committee. If not, the commission, which is separate and independent from the college, is competent to impose any disciplinary sanctions.
