= Romanian Anti-Doping Agency =

Romanian Anti-Doping Agency, established in 2005, is the Romanian National Anti-Doping Agency (Agenţia Naţională Anti-Doping/ANAD), affiliated to the World Anti-Doping Agency (WADA). The institution is subordinated to the Government of Romania. It replaced the previous Laboratorul de Control Doping which was part of the Institutul Național de Cercetare (1994–2005). Cristian Balaj serves as the president of the ANAD.
