= Alva Geikie =

Australian feminist activist

- Born: Alva C Geikie; 29 January 1936 (age 90); Brunswick, Victoria, Australia
- Education: Monash University (B.A.)
- Occupations: Feminist; activist; teacher

Alva Geikie (born 29 January 1936) is an Australian feminist activist originally from Melbourne, Victoria. She made significant contributions in the early days of the women’s liberation movement in Melbourne, co-founded the Women’s Action Committee in 1970, and organised and participated in many campaigns and actions in support of women's rights. She was recognised for her significant contributions to community activism by being awarded the Edna Ryan Award.

== Early life and education ==
Geikie was born on 29 January 1936 in Brunswick, a suburb of Melbourne. For primary school she was educated at local state-schools in Coburg. She later attended Preston Girls' Secondary School in the neighbouring suburb of Preston. After completing a three-year Diploma in Needlecraft at Emily MacPherson College, she worked as a dressmaker at the Myer department store in Melbourne for two years, then qualified to become a teacher of needlecraft. Her skills took her overseas for three years in the early 1960s where she worked at the Old Vic Theatre in London as a costumier and travelled around during each summer. After returning to Australia, Geikie undertook teacher training at Preston Technical School (now Melbourne Polytechnic). After qualifying, she worked as a teacher at Princes Hill High School. While teaching during the day, Geikie completed a Bachelor of Arts at Monash University at night, majoring in politics and history. After completing a Graduate Diploma in Teaching English to Adults, Geikie later worked teaching English as a Second Language in TAFE, at a Teacher's College in Thailand, and with an Aboriginal community before her retirement in 1999.

== Activism ==
While teaching at Princess Hill, Geikie happened to see a newspaper article about feminist activist Zelda D'Aprano who was fighting against pay inequality. Shortly after, on 31 October 1969, Geikie and her flatmate and fellow teacher Thelma Solomon joined D'Aprano in chaining themselves to the doors of the Arbitration Court, the court that had dismissed the Equal Pay Case. This action coincided with a state-wide teachers' strike, which enabled Solomon and Geikie to attend without risking any penalty.

The following year, D'Aprano, Geikie and Solomon co-founded the Women's Action Committee (WAC) on 2 March 1970. The first meeting was held at the home of Geikie and Solomon with at least 20 women in attendance. Fellow feminist activist, Bon Hull, was also an integral member of the group. The WAC gave rise to Melbourne's growing women's liberation movement in the early 1970s. It provided women with opportunities to meet, encouraged more women to get involved in activism, and campaigned on a variety of feminist issues in Australian society. This led some women to take more militant action in their campaigns highlighting the inequality of women's pay scales. Geikie was involved in organising and participating in the Equal Pay Tram Ride, where WAC members travelled around Melbourne but only paid 75% of the fares, because women were only receiving 75% of the wage of their male co-workers at the time. Equal pay for female teachers wasn't phased in until 1971, following a major union campaign. The Committee helped arrange Australia's first pro-choice rally in 1975, with a march being attended by more than 500 women.

Geikie participated in actions that protested against men-only public bars. WAC members, including Geikie, conducted a pub crawl across Melbourne, highlighting that women were prohibited from drinking in a hotel's bar, but were forced to pay extra and restricted to drinking in ladies lounges. In 1970 Geikie was also involved in organising the anti-Miss Teenage Quest demonstrations.

In 1972, Geikie and other WAC members founded the Women’s Liberation Centre on Little Latrobe Street in Melbourne. Geikie attended Women’s Liberation Centre meetings and was also an active member of Vashti’s Voice and the Women’s Abortion Action Campaign.

In 1972, Geikie helped co-write the joint submission of the Women’s Liberation Movement and the Women’s Electoral Lobby for the Equal Pay Case. Geikie is quoted as saying: “To me, the women’s liberation movement was one of the greatest social movements of the 20th century. And it’s important that we know about it.”

== Honours and awards ==
In 2005, Geikie received an Edna Ryan Award, in honour of her contributions to community activism. These Australian awards were established to recognise women who have "made a feminist difference".

Geikie was one of the activists featured in the feature documentary BRAZEN HUSSIES, produced in 2021. This film explores the origins of the Australian Women's Liberation Movement through a combination of archival footage and interviews with key activists from across the country.

== Archives ==
The State Library of Victoria (SLV) has acquired Geikie’s collection of papers that includes original documents, photographs, speeches and newsletters. A core part of the archives includes Geikie's two-volume history, The Women’s Action Committee and the Women’s Liberation Movement, Melbourne 1969–1975. The papers of Alva Geikie are part of the legacy of the women's liberation movement, and document a significant period of women's history in Australia that is important to preserve.

== Bibliography ==
Geikie, Alva C; Women's Liberation Movement (Melbourne, Vic.); Women's Action Committee (Melbourne, Vic.) (2023), The Women's Action Committee and the women's liberation movement Melbourne 1969-1975, Alva. C. Geikie
