= Leo Schofield =

Australian art director and restaurant critic

Leo Schofield AM
- Born: 6 May 1935 (age 91); Brewarrina, New South Wales, Australia
- Education: Christian Brothers' High School, Lewisham
- Occupations: Restaurant critic, advertising professional and arts festival director
- Spouse: Anne Schofield (divorced)
- Children: 3 daughters

Leo George Schofield AM (born 6 May 1935) had a notable career as an advertising professional, journalist, creative arts festival director, and trustee of arts and cultural organisations. After many years in other states of Australia he now lives again in Sydney, New South Wales.

== Biography ==
Schofield was born in Brewarrina, New South Wales, the son of a football-loving publican. (Which football code is unclear, but it is likely to have been rugby league, based on the location and era.) He was educated at Christian Brothers' High School, Lewisham and commenced his first job in 1949, as a 14-year-old, in the haberdashery department of Grace Bros, an Australian store chain.

He entered journalism in the 1970s at the Sunday Australian, which folded into the Sunday Telegraph. He also contributed to numerous other publications including The Australian, Vogue, The Bulletin and the Sydney Morning Herald for two decades. In 1984, Schofield established The Sydney Morning Herald Good Food Guide with co-editors David Dale and Jenna Price; and remained editor until the ninth edition was published in 1993.

He was the artistic director of the Melbourne International Arts Festival between 1993 and 1996. In 1997 he assumed responsibility as artistic director of the Sydney Festival (between 1998 and 2001), and conjointly held the position as artistic director of the 2000 Summer Olympics and the 2000 Summer Paralympics arts festivals.

In 2010, Schofield took on the role of a judge on the Australian adaptation of the cooking program Iron Chef.

He has variously served on the boards of Sydney Symphony Orchestra (inaugural Chairman from 1996 to 2000), the Centennial Park Trust, the National Trust of Australia (NSW), and as a Trustee of the Powerhouse Museum, the Dame Joan Hammond Foundation, Melbourne's Old Treasury Building, and the Sydney Opera House Trust.

== Personal life ==
Schofield’s wife was Anne Schofield AM who is an antique jewellery dealer. They first met when she was at school at Santa Sabina College in Strathfield and later while he was directing plays at the Sydney University Dramatic Society. Anne went to London to marry him in 1962, and after daughter Nell was born in 1963 they returned to Australia. In 1965, twins Emma and Tess were born. Together they restored the John Frederick Hilly designed Oddfellows Hall at 38 Queen Street, Woollahra as Queen Street Galleries with her jewellery store on the ground floor. In the same decade they restored St Kevin’s at 117 Queen Street, Woollahra, as a family home. The house was built in 1892 to a design by John Bede Barlow. Schofield and his wife separated after 19 years of marriage. Schofield came out in 2015, and stated "many gay men would envy me for the fact that I've been able to have children."

== Controversy ==
In 1989 Schofield and John Fairfax & Sons were parties to the Blue Angel defamation case. In a review of the meal published in the Sydney Morning Herald in 1984, Schofield compared a lobster dish as "...close to culinary crime". He wrote it had been "...cooked until every drop of juice and joy in the thing had been successfully eliminated... leaving a charred husk of a shell containing meat that might have been albino walrus". A damages award of $100,000 plus interest was made against Schofield and Fairfax when it was found that they had defamed the Blue Angel restaurant.

In 2015, after Schofield failed to secure increased funding for the Hobart Baroque Festival, he attacked Tasmania in the Sydney press; calling the island state's leaders and residents who had previously funded his music festival "dregs, bogans and third-generation morons". Schofield's comments were widely refuted and condemned by leading Tasmanian and Australian arts figures, as well as political leaders. Schofield's views were derided by celebrated Tasmanian author, Bradley Trevor Greive, as "churlish, gauche and unforgivably small", with numerous arts commentators describing Schofield's remarks as highly offensive, petulant, unbecoming and divisive. Tasmanian Premier, Will Hodgman released an official statement promoting Tasmania's commitment to the arts and his government's "support [of] exceptional events and festivals". Hodgman also stated that "Leo Schofield's comments [were] derogatory, ignorant and right out of step with what the vast majority of people are saying about Tasmania." Schofield later claimed to be taking anti-depressants and drinking excessively. In an article published on the Tasmanian Times website, Schofield said he was deeply sorry for his "ill-considered, intemperate and inelegant remarks" for which he apologized unreservedly. Schofield later relocated the Baroque Festival to Brisbane where, according to Luke Martin from the Tourism Industry Council of Tasmania, who accused Schofield of "blatant mistruths", the Queensland-based festival program received exactly the same amount of funding that prompted Schofield's embarrassing public outburst against Tasmania. The 2016 Brisbane Baroque festival opening night was picketed by an informal Tasmanian pro-arts performance group, known as "Leo's Bogan Brigade", who used the media attention focussed on Schofield's negative remarks as a positive opportunity to promote young and emerging Tasmanian artists.

== Bibliography ==
- The Garden at Bronte. Camberwell, Victoria: Viking. 2002. p. 178. ISBN 9780670878666.

== Awards ==
- 2000 appointed a Member of the Order of Australia for service to the arts, particularly the Sydney Festival and the Melbourne Festival, as a fundraiser and administrator, and to environmental and heritage conservation
- 2001 awarded the Australian Government Centenary Medal for outstanding service to the Australian arts, culture, heritage and food industry
- 2002 made a Chevalier de l'Ordre des Arts et des Lettres by the French Government
