= NextSense =

Coordinates: 33.766804°S 151.028302°E

Location
- Sydney, Australia

Information
- Type: Public
- Motto: Redefine what's possible.
- Established: 22 October 1860
- Website: nextsense.org.au

NextSense, formerly the Royal Institute for Deaf & Blind Children (RIDBC), in Sydney provides a range of educational services for students with vision and/or hearing impairment, including specialist schools for signing deaf students, oral deaf students, and students with sensory and intellectual disabilities.

NextSense offers additional services such as therapy and braille text production, a children's audiology centre, and also conducts research and professional development through its RIDBC Renwick Centre. Historically it is an important centre of deaf culture in Australia. It currently operates several educational centres on New South Wales and offers some national services.

== History ==
NextSense was opened on the 22 October 1860 by deaf Scottish immigrant Thomas Pattison, who was the school's first teacher. Located at 152 Liverpool St Sydney, the school was originally named the "Deaf and Dumb Institution of New South Wales". From its early days it was open to all deaf children, though many were turned away for lack of resources. Sydney was still a young city at the time, with only 80,000 inhabitants; the University of Sydney had been established a mere ten years prior and public education was in its infancy. The school began to take in blind students in 1869, and added the word "blind" to its name. It was predominantly a boarding school, and moved many times within central Sydney to accommodate more students as the school grew, including stints in Paddington and Newtown.

By 1891, the school had 85 students: 49 boys and 36 girls. Of those students, 62 hailed from New South Wales, 16 from Queensland, five from Tasmania, and two from New Zealand.

In 1961, the school moved to North Rocks. Its former building was taken over by the University of Sydney. In 1962, the institution provided the premises for two state schools operated by the NSW Department of Education: North Rocks School for Deaf Children and North Rocks School for Blind Children.

In 2019, NextSense hosted its first sports camp for deaf children.

=== Former names ===
- 1860–1868: Deaf and Dumb Institution of New South Wales
- 1868–1869: New South Wales Deaf and Dumb Institution
- 1869–1957: New South Wales Deaf Dumb and Blind Institution
- 1957–1974: Royal NSW Institution for Deaf and Blind Children
- 1974–1997: Royal NSW Institute for Deaf and Blind Children (RIDBC)
- 1997–2021: Royal Institute for Deaf and Blind Children

== Schools ==
NextSense operates three specialist schools:

- The RIDBC Alice Betteridge School, for children with sensory and intellectual disabilities (renamed from "The Special School for Multi-handicapped Blind Students" in 1990).
- The RIDBC Garfield Barwick School, for "oral" deaf children who communicate using speech and assisted hearing. Opened in 1988 as a primary school to prepare deaf students for a mainstream high school.
- The RIDBC Thomas Pattison School, which provides education in Auslan, Australia's Deaf sign language. Established in 1992 as the "Thomas Pattison Annexe", renamed as a school in 1997.

NextSense also offers some teleschool programs for rural students.

== Services for children ==
RIDBC runs a number of early childhood services. These include home based, centre based and remote early education programs for children up to 5 years who have sensory disabilities, as well as five special preschools (RIDBC Hunter Preschool, RIDBC Nepean Preschool, RIDBC VisionEd Preschool, RIDBC Roberta Reid Preschool, RIDBC Rockie Woofit Preschool) and support for children with sensory disabilities enrolled in mainstream preschools.

In 1997, RIDBC announce a new program, RIDBC Teleschool, which combined the existing Remote Early Learning Programs for vision impairment and hearing impairment.

In addition to its direct services, RIDBC aims to help as many deaf and blind children as possible through its RIDBC Renwick Centre, for research and professional education of those educating children with sensory disability. The RIDBC Renwick Centre is conducted in conjunction with the Macquarie University and offers a range of post-graduate courses (including a Master of Special Education in Sensory Disability) and continuing education activities. The RIDBC Renwick Centre attracts students from across Australia and internationally.

== Community support ==
RIDBC is a major Australian charity but relies heavily on Government subsidy and community support to continue its services.

== Notable alumni ==
- Alice Betteridge, the first Australian deafblind child to receive an education. She enrolled in 1908 at the age of seven where she learned to read and write, graduating as dux in 1920.
- David Hunter, elected as member of the NSW parliament (for Ashfield) when he was 35 and served there for 35 years (1940–1976). He was responsible for the passing of an Act in 1944 to make the education of blind and deaf children compulsory.

== Ambassadors ==
- Michael Parkinson – English broadcaster, journalist, author, and chat show legend
- Tara Moss – Former model and international best-selling author
- Graham Ross – Host of TV gardening show Better Homes & Gardens and radio presenter on 2GB
- Justin Norris – Australian Olympic swimmer (butterfly and individual medley)

== See also ==
- Deaf education
- Blindness and education
