= Thelma Solomon =

Australian feminist activist

- Born: Thelma Jean Solomon; 2 April 1936; Adelaide, South Australia
- Died: 19 February 2003 (aged 66)
- Education: La Trobe University
- Occupations: Feminist; activist; teacher

Thelma Jean Solomon (2 April 1936 - 19 February 2003) was an Australian feminist activist originally from Adelaide, South Australia. She made significant contributions in the early days of the women’s liberation movement in Melbourne, co-founded the Women’s Action Committee in 1970, participated in many campaigns and actions in support of women's rights, and for over 30 years was involved in many feminist and lesbian collectives.

== Early life and education ==
Thelma Solomon was born in Adelaide on 2 April 1936 but moved to Melbourne with her family when she was six months old. Solomon's father was English and her mother was Italian. Solomon's mother remarried to an ex-communist when she was aged five, and he instilled in his step-daughter a strong sense of social justice. Solomon was educated at MacRobertson Girls High School in Albert Park. She worked for several years as a radiographer at the Peter MacCallum Cancer Institute before retraining to become a teacher.

== Activism ==
Solomon was inspired after reading an article about the radical action of Zelda D'Aprano, who was fighting against pay inequality between men and women. Not long after, on 31 October 1969, Solomon and her flatmate and fellow teacher Alva Geikie, joined D'Aprano in chaining themselves to the doors of the Arbitration Commission, the court that had dismissed the Equal Pay Case. This action coincided with a state-wide teachers' strike, which enabled Solomon and Geikie to attend without risking any penalty.

The following year, on 2 March 1970, Solomon, D’Aprano and Geikie co-founded the Women's Action Committee (WAC). Fellow feminist activist, Jessie "Bon" Hull, was also an integral member of the group. The WAC gave rise to Melbourne's growing women's liberation movement in the early 1970s. It provided women with opportunities to meet, encouraged more women to get involved in activism, and campaigned on a variety of feminist issues in Australian society. This led some women to take more militant action in their campaigns highlighting the inequality of women's pay scales. Solomon participated in all of the radical actions organised by WAC over the next two years. This included being involved in the Equal Pay Tram Ride, where WAC members travelled around Melbourne but only paid 75% of the fares, because women were only receiving 75% of the wage of their male co-workers at the time. Equal pay for female teachers wasn't phased in until 1971, following a major union campaign. The Committee helped arrange Australia's first pro-choice rally in 1975, with a march being attended by more than 500 women. Solomon was also involved in actions that protested against men-only access to public bars. WAC members conducted a pub crawl across Melbourne, highlighting that women were prohibited from drinking in a hotel's bar, but were forced to pay extra and restricted to drinking in ladies lounges. In 1970 she was also involved in organising the anti-Miss Teenage Quest demonstrations. In 1971 Solomon helped to organise the National Women's Liberation Conference on Women and Work and Women and the Trade Unions at Melbourne University. In 1972, WAC members, including Solomon, helped found the Women’s Liberation Centre on Little Latrobe Street in Melbourne.

Solomon helped set up the La Trobe University Women's Group while she was a student between 1972 and 1980. The period when she was most active in the women's liberation movement was also the time when she came out as a lesbian. She was a lesbian feminist activist for over 30 years and involved in many feminist and lesbian collectives during this time. These included being a member of Lesbian Line, the first phone information, support and referral service for lesbians by lesbians set up in 1981, and joining the Women’s Liberation Archives Group in 1983 to help put out their first calendar in conjunction with Sybylla Press. Solomon was a member of the collective that organised the National Lesbian Conference in 1990 and the National 10/40 Conference in 1992. She was a founding member of the Matrix Guild of Victoria in 1992, which provided accommodation for lesbians in old age. She helped found the Performing Older Women’s Circus in 1995 and the Lesbian Cancer Support Group in 1997. She performed as a clown in the circus's first three shows (Act Your Age, 1995, Still Revolting!!!, 1996 and Every Witch Way, 1996) and was one of their aerialists at age 60. During the 1990s she was also a member of the Coalition Against Trafficking in Women. Solomon re-joined the Victorian Women’ Liberation and Lesbian Feminist Archives Inc at the end of 1999 and the Lesbian Cancer Support Group at the beginning of 2002 and was an active member of both these groups until the end of her life.

== Death and legacy ==
Solomon died of cancer on 19 February 2003 at the age of 66. She was survived by her partner of 17 years Maureen Gie. Several published obituaries honoured Solomon for her significant contributions to lesbian and women's communities over the course of her life. Her life story was also featured in a travelling exhibition of lesbian stories, Forbidden Love Bold Passions, held at the State Library of Victoria in 1996.

== Archives ==
The Papers of Thelma Solomon, formerly held by the Victorian Women's Liberation and Lesbian Feminist Archives, are now held by the University of Melbourne Archives. The Papers of Alva Geikie, held by the State Library of Victoria, also include obituaries and tributes for Thelma Solomon both in manuscript form and newspaper clippings.
