= Georgie Dent =

Australian social policy researcher and writer

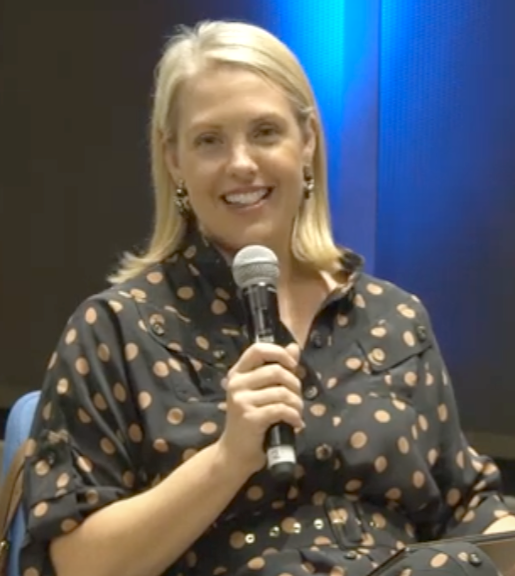
- At an ANU panel discussion in 2023
- Education: Queensland University of Technology
- Occupations: Journalist, lawyer
- Awards: Edna Ryan Award (2021)

Georgie Dent is an Australian writer, journalist, former lawyer, and social researcher. She is an advocate of women's empowerment, workforce participation, and gender equality, and is as of 2026 CEO of The Parenthood, an advocacy group representing parents and carers. She is the author of the book Breaking Badly: How I Worried Myself Sick, published in 2019.

== Education ==
Dent obtained a double degree in law and business from the Queensland University of Technology, in 2005.

== Career ==
Dent's early career involved working as a junior solicitor in commercial law, at MinterEllison, followed by work writing for BRW. She subsequently obtained work as a journalist and editor.

Dent was invited by the Swedish Government to attend the Stockholm Forum on Gender Equality in 2018.

Her book, Breaking Badly, was published by Affirm Press in 2019, and was described by Annabel Crabb as "funny, shocking, beautifully written". She presented her book at the Sydney Writers' Festival.

As of 2026 Dent is CEO of The Parenthood, an advocacy organisation which represents mothers, parents and carers, and their allies around Australia.

== Media ==
Dent has appeared regularly on TV in Australia such as The Drum, The Project, The Today Show, and ABC Weekend Breakfast, and has also appeared on Q+A, Weekend Sunrise, Studio 10, Lateline, and Sky News.

She was a columnist for the The Sun-Herald and The Age, and has also written for Marie Claire and been a contributing editor for Women's Agenda.

Dent was a co-instigator of the 2020 hashtag #CredibleWomen, after the Office of the Prime Minister, Scott Morrison, had dismissed the view that "the Australian Federal Budget ignored issues surrounding and relating to women". The Office commented that "no one credible" agreed with that view. However, the #CredibleWomen hashtag had 15,000 tweets posted within a few hours. Following the 2022 election, it was argued that "women stormed the 2022 election in numbers too big to ignore" and influenced the election result, supporting Dent's comments that issues related to women are important in state and federal politics. During the election campaign, Dent met Anthony Albanese to discuss these issues.

Dent has written about jobs creation, actions required for unity and safety and respect of women, the motherhood penalty, as well as issues that will improve the lives of women in Australia.

Dent addressed the National Press Club in Canberra on 23 September 2026. Her talk was titled "The mother and father of all problems: Australia can’t afford for raising a family to be unaffordable".

== Parental leave and economic benefits ==
Dent has commented that childcare, and men taking parental leave, which enables women to increase their workforce participation, will lead to better economic benefits for both the economy and individuals. The joint NSW and Victoria childcare package, was described as "an astute investment" by Dent, who commented that:

Early childhood education and care is nation-building infrastructure that we need now.

Dent has advocated for a new improved paid parental leave scheme, and high quality and free early childhood education, as well as flexible workplaces, with accessibility for paid career leave for people who have sick children, with both the State and Federal Australian governments.

== Awards ==
- 2014 - Women's Empowerment Journalism Awards in Singapore
- 2015 - Our Watch Walkley Award - finalist, for excellent reporting of domestic violence
- 2021 - Edna Ryan Award - Workforce category
- 2022 - Impact 25 Awards - Pro Bono Australia

== Publications ==
- Breaking Badly: How I Worried Myself Sick (2019)
