= Lyndall Ryan =

Australian academic and historian (1943–2024)

Lyndall Ryan AO, FAHA
- Born: 14 April 1943; Paddington, New South Wales, Australia
- Died: 30 April 2024 (aged 81); Newcastle, New South Wales, Australia
- Relatives: Edna Ryan (mother)
- Awards: John Barrett Award for Australian Studies (2013); Fellow of the Australian Academy of the Humanities (2018); Member of the Order of Australia (2019); Officer of the Order of Australia (2025)

Academic background
- Education: University of Sydney (BA, DipEd); Macquarie University (PhD)
- Thesis: Aborigines in Tasmania, 1800–1974 and their problems with the Europeans (1975)
- Influences: Manning Clark

Academic work
- Institutions: University of Newcastle (1998–2005); Flinders University (1984–1997); Griffith University (1977–1983)
- Main interests: Indigenous Australian history Australian colonial relations
- Notable works: The Aboriginal Tasmanians (1981)

Lyndall Ryan, AO, FAHA (14 April 1943 – 30 April 2024) was an Australian academic and historian. She held positions in Australian studies and women's studies at Griffith University and Flinders University and was the foundation professor of Australian studies and head of the School of Humanities at the University of Newcastle from 1998 to 2005. She was later a conjoint professor in the Centre for the History of Violence at the University of Newcastle.

== Early life ==
Ryan was born on 14 April 1943 at the Royal Hospital for Women in Sydney. She was one of three children born to Edna Minna Ryan (née Nelson) and John Francis Edwin Michael Ryan. Ryan's parents were left-wing activists who were former members of the Communist Party of Australia; her father was a butcher by profession. Her mother, a public servant, was a prominent feminist and represented the Australian Labor Party on the Fairfield Municipal Council in the 1950s and 1960s.

Ryan was raised in the Sydney suburbs of Woollahra and Canley Heights. She attended Woollahra Public School and Canley Vale Public School before completing her secondary education at Fairfield Girls' High School. After her father's death in 1958 she lived alone with her mother for several years, her older siblings having left home.

Ryan left school in 1959 and worked as a typist for one year, before enrolling in the University of Sydney in 1961 on a Commonwealth Scholarship. She graduated Bachelor of Arts in 1964 majoring in history and government, also completing a diploma in education. Ryan worked as an English and history teacher at Campbelltown High School for one year before returning to university in 1966. She completed a Master of Arts in history at the Australian National University in 1969, during which time she worked as a research assistant to historian Manning Clark.

== Academic career ==
Ryan completed a PhD at Macquarie University in 1975, her thesis was titled "Aborigines in Tasmania, 1800–1974 and their problems with the Europeans".

Ryan's book The Aboriginal Tasmanians, first published in 1981, presented an interpretation of the early relations between Tasmanian Aborigines and white settlers in Tasmania. A second edition, published by Allen & Unwin in 1996, brought the story of the Tasmanian Aborigines in the 20th century up to date. Her work was later criticised by Keith Windschuttle who suggested there were discrepancies between Ryan's claims and her supporting evidence, thus drawing her into the "history wars". Ryan contested Windschuttle's claims in an essay entitled 'Who is the fabricator?' in Robert Manne's Whitewash: On Keith Windschuttle Fabrication of Aboriginal History published in 2003 and further addressed them in her book, Tasmanian Aborigines: A History Since 1803, published in 2012.

=== Colonial frontier massacres project ===
In 2017, Ryan and her team at the University of Newcastle released an on-line map showing more than 150 massacre sites in Eastern Australia. Within 6 months, the site was accessed more than sixty thousand times and has received coverage in Australia and also internationally. The on-line tool provides approximate locations, dates and other details of claimed massacres and provides corroborating sources. As of 3 March 2019, the project showed at least 270 frontier massacres had occurred over a period of 140 years starting in 1794. Ryan has suggested the map is an important step in acknowledging the extensive violence used against indigenous people in Australia's history.

== Recognition ==
Ryan was awarded the 2018 Annual History Citation by the History Council of NSW for "her research and teaching in women's and Indigenous history, and her service to the profession in contributing to the development of Australian Studies and Women's Studies". She was elected a Fellow of the Australian Academy of the Humanities in November 2018, appointed a Member of the Order of Australia in the 2019 Australia Day Honours in recognition of her "significant service to higher education, particularly to Indigenous history and women's studies", and posthumously advanced to Officer of the Order of Australia in the 2025 Australia Day Honours.

== Death ==
Ryan died in Newcastle of cancer on 30 April 2024, at the age of 81.

== Bibliography ==
=== Books ===
- — (1981). The Aboriginal Tasmanians. St Lucia: University of Queensland Press. ISBN 0-7022-1903-7.
  - — (1995). The Aboriginal Tasmanians (2nd ed.). St. Leonards, New South Wales: Allen & Unwin. ISBN 1-86373-965-3.
- —; Magarey, Susan (1990). A Bibliography of Australian Women's History. Parkville, Victoria: Australian Historical Association. ISBN 0958751358.
- —; Sheridan, Susan; Baird, Barbara; Borrett, Kate (2001). Who Was That Woman?: The Australian Women's Weekly in the Postwar Years. Sydney: University of New South Wales Press. ISBN 0-86840-618-X.
- — (2012). Tasmanian Aborigines: A History Since 1803. Crows Nest, New South Wales: Allen & Unwin. ISBN 978-1-74237-068-2.

=== Edited books ===
- —; Dwyer, Philip, eds. (2012). Theatres of Violence: Massacre, Mass Killing and Atrocity throughout History. New York: Berghahn Books. ISBN 978-0-85745-299-3.
- —; Lydon, Jane, eds. (2018). Remembering the Myall Creek Massacre. Sydney: NewSouth Publishing. ISBN 978-1-74223-575-2.

=== Reports ===
- —; Ripper, Margie; Buttfield, Barbara (1994). We Women Decide: Women's Experiences of Seeking Abortion in Queensland, South Australia and Tasmania, 1985–1992. Bedford Park, South Australia: Women's Studies Unit, Flinders University.
