= Statue of Zelda D'Aprano =

Bronze statue in Melbourne, Australia

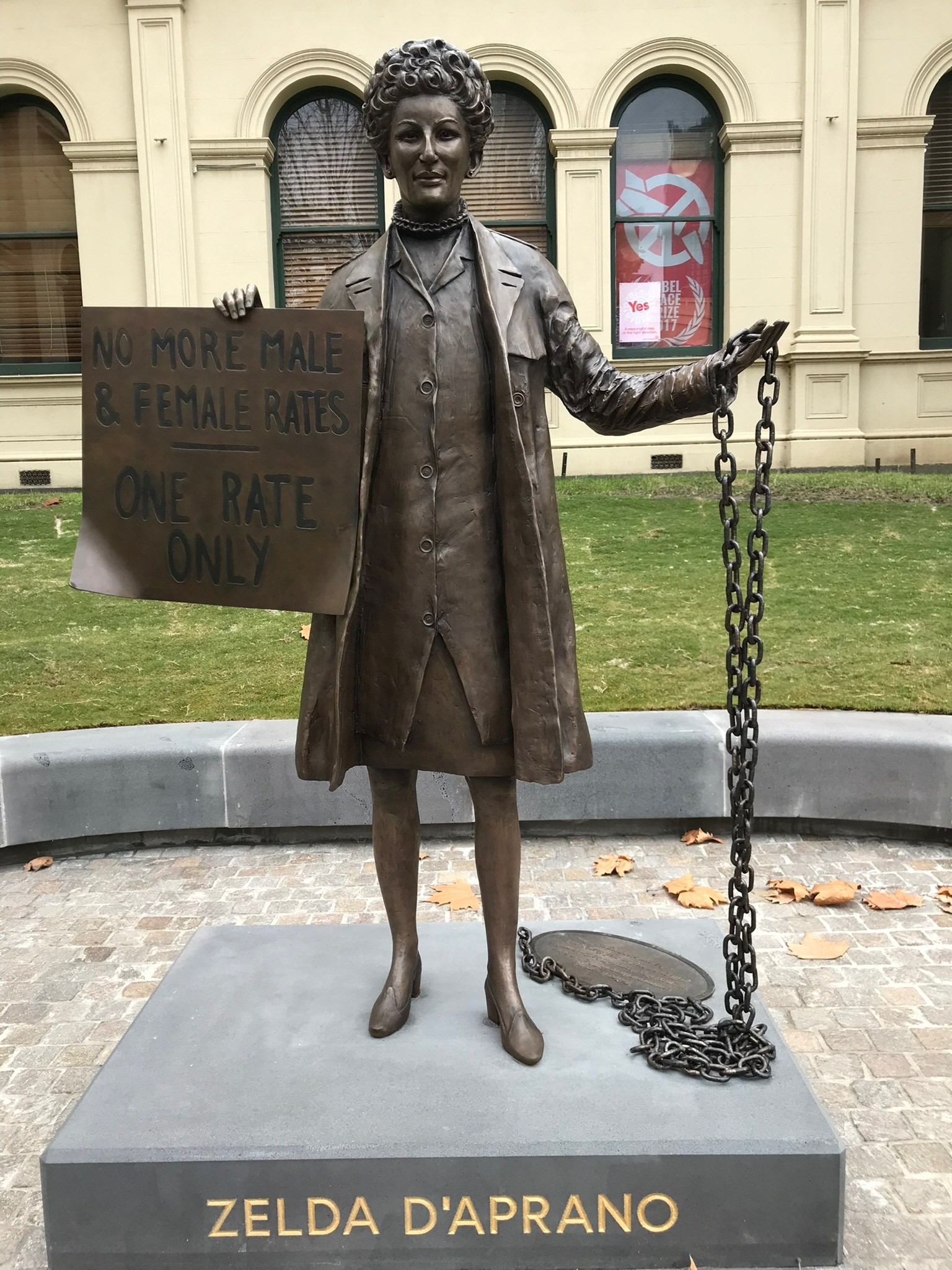
- Jennifer Mann's life-size bronze statue of Zelda D'Aprano, was unveiled outside Victorian Trades Hall on 30 May 2023
- Artist: Jennifer Mann
- Year: 2023
- Completion date: 30 May 2023
- Type: Sculpture
- Medium: Bronze
- Subject: Zelda D'Aprano
- Location: Melbourne, Australia

The Statue of Zelda D'Aprano is a bronze statue located outside the Victorian Trades Hall, Melbourne, Australia. It commemorates the life of feminist activist Zelda D'Aprano.

== Background ==
In March 2022, the state government of Victoria announced that the Victorian Trades Hall Council, together with advocacy group A Monument of One's Own, had been successful in applying to the Victorian Women's Public Art Program for a grant to commission and erect a statue of D'Aprano. The grant was the first successful campaign for A Monument of One's Own.

In May 2022, it was announced that artist Jennifer Mann's proposal had been accepted as the preferred design for the statue. The bronze work, inspired by an iconic photograph of Zelda, is titled 'Chain Reaction'. It was cast by Fundere Fine Art Foundry.

== Sculpture ==
The statue depicts D'Aprano during her protest in 1969 when she chained herself to the doors of the Commonwealth Arbitration Commission building calling for equal pay for women. She is shown holding a metal chain, and a placard reading “No more male & female rates. One rate only.” Lying on the statue's plinth is a quote by D'Aprano also in bronze: "Today it was me, tomorrow there will be two of us, and the next day there will be three and it will go on and on there won't be any stopping it."

The statue was positioned on the South West lawn at Trades Hall, facing onto Lygon Street. It was unveiled on 30 May 2023 by former Prime Minister of Australia, Julia Gillard. Also present at the ceremony were Minister for Women Natalie Hutchins, co-convenor of A Monument of One's Own, Clare Wright, Victorian Trades Hall Council Assistant Secretary Wilhelmina Stracke and sculptor Jennifer Mann.
