= Blue Angel defamation case =

Australian defamation court case

The Blue Angel defamation case was a famous 1989 Australian court case that saw a Sydney food writer and newspaper lose $100,000 plus interest for defaming a restaurant.

On 21 May 1984, Sydney Morning Herald food critic Leo Schofield and a companion, David Spode, ate at the Blue Angel Restaurant in East Sydney, New South Wales. They ate lobster, garlic prawns, and lemon sole. When they departed Schofield left a tip and his business card. Schofield's review appeared in The Herald on 29 May 1984, under the headline 'High drama where lobsters have no privacy'.

The review was highly unfavourable. It began:

I have never really understood about live fish in tanks in restaurants. If they are seen as a way to guarantee freshness, then surely we ought also to have live pigs in pens in the middle of restaurants, ready for slaughter to ensure the freshest possible loin of pork and the odd steer waiting patiently to be zapped by the electric hammer before transformation.

The review "was written in Schofield's satirical and flamboyant style, prefaced with a reworded version of Lewis Carroll's Lobster Quadrille".

Schofield wrote there was a 45-minute wait for grilled lobster:

That should have really sent the balloon up for us. Even Godzilla boiled for 45 minutes would be appallingly overcooked. Which is what our grilled lobster most certainly was, cooked until every drop of juice and joy in the thing had been successfully eliminated, leaving a charred husk of a shell containing meat that might have been albino walrus.

The "carbonised claws" of the lobster "contained only a kind of white powder" and the treatment of the $25 a kilo meat was "close to culinary crime". The prawns and sole "suffered from the same exposure to heat, the former converted into chewy little shapes without a lot of flavour and the latter a slab of overcooked fish slimy with oil.".

The restaurant owner, Marcello Marcobello, sued Schofield and the publisher, John Fairfax and Sons Ltd, in New South Wales for defamation. The case was heard before Justice Enderby and a jury of four in 1989.

Marcobello claimed Schofield imputed he was a cruel and inhumane restaurateur because the restaurant killed live lobsters by boiling them alive and cooked lobsters for 45 minutes, which was contrary to standard cooking; he charged prices that didn't reflect good value; he served charred lobster and severely overcooked garlic prawns and lemon sole.

Schofield and Fairfax claimed fair comment and truth as their defences. Witnesses (including Spode) claimed to have eaten overcooked meals at the Blue Angel, and Marcello Marcobello's own father, Frank Marcobello, said he had reservations about chef Antonnella Cortese. There had also been an error in the review: 'broiled' was typeset as 'boiled'. Marcello Marcobello pointed out that no correction of errors had been printed, his witnesses claimed the food in question was very good and not overcooked, and Ms Cortese offered detailed explanations of her cooking methods. Marcobello also cast doubt on his father's testimony, and claimed their ongoing feud was the reason he testified for the respondents.

Schofield and Fairfax lost and were ordered to pay $78,000 to Marcobello and $22,000 to the restaurant. More than $50,000 interest was added. "There was nothing else in the news for days", John Newton recalled 15 years later.

The key reason the defence of fair comment failed was that they did not satisfy some of the basic requirements of the court. Most importantly, the respondents were unable to prove the truth of the facts on which the opinion had been based. They had eaten the evidence.
