= Cristian Balaj =

Romanian footballer and referee

- Full name: Pavel Cristian Balaj
- Born: 17 August 1971 (age 55); Baia Mare, Romania
- Other occupation: Company manager

Domestic
Years	League	Role
1994–2016	Romania	Referee
2000–2016	Liga I	Referee

International
Years	League	Role
2003–2016	FIFA listed	Referee

Pavel Cristian Balaj (born 17 August 1971 in Baia Mare, Maramureș County, Romania) is a Romanian former football player and retired referee.

On 18 January 2019, Balaj was elected Romanian Anti-Doping Agency President. Subsequently, on 4 November 2021, Balaj signed with Liga I 7 times champion club CFR Cluj as their new president, after the departure of Marian Copilu earlier in 2021.

== Career ==
As a player, Balaj represented FC Baia Mare and Pécsi Mecsek FC. He became a referee in 1994, entered Romania's Liga I in 2000, and earned FIFA certification in 2003.

At international level, Balaj has served as a referee in qualifying rounds for Euro 2008 and Euro 2012, as well as 2010 and 2014 World Cup qualifiers.
