= Azerbaijan National Anti-Doping Agency =

- Azerbaijani: Azərbaycan Milli Antidopinq Agentliyi
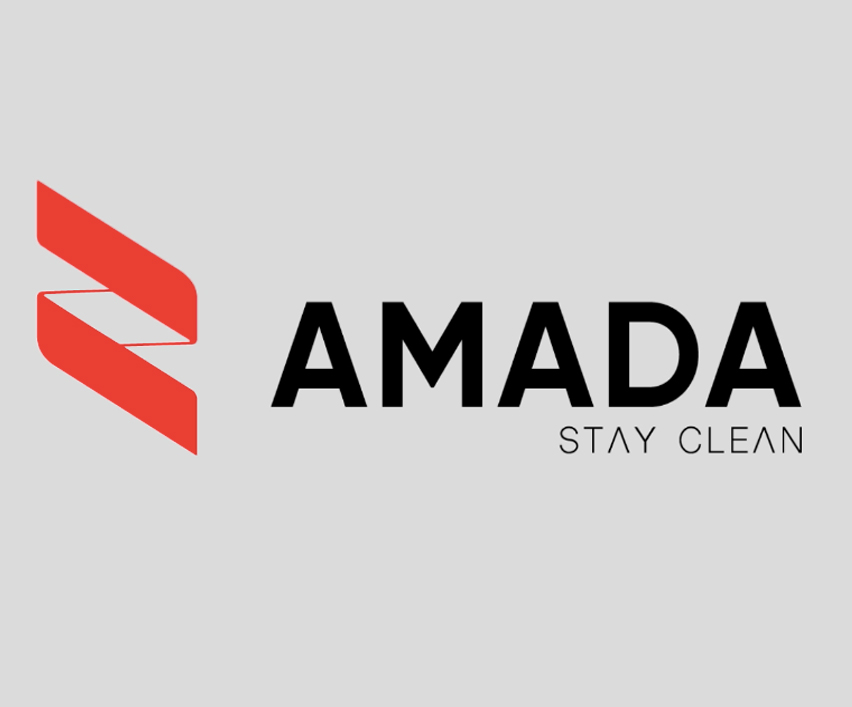
- Azerbaijan National Anti-Doping Agency

Agency overview
- Formed: 23.12.2016
- Headquarters: Baku
- Website: Amada.az/

Azerbaijan National Anti-Doping Agency (AMADA) (Azərbaycan Milli Antidopinq Agentliyi) is an independent body responsible for the fight against doping in sport in Azerbaijan, established by the Law of the Republic of Azerbaijan "On the fight against the use of doping substances and methods in sport" and the Decree of the President of the Republic of Azerbaijan on its implementation on December 23, 2016. The Agency is a public legal entity, with the state registration of the Ministry of Taxes. The Agency is composed of a supervisory board and the operational body. The AMADA is headed by its CEO Tahmina Taghi-zada.
