= Deborah Brennan =

Australian Professor in social policy research

Deborah Brennan AM FASSA
- Occupations: Childcare and gender equity advocate
- Known for: Childcare
- Title: Emeritus Professor

Academic background
- Education: University of Sydney
- Thesis: Women, the state and the politics of child care (1990)

Deborah Jane Brennan AM FASSA is an Australian Professor in social policy research, who was awarded a Member of the Order of Australia, in the Queens Birthday Honours list, in 2022, for her significant service to social policy research, gender equity and tertiary education.

== Education and career ==
Brennan obtained her bachelor's degree in political science and government at the University of Sydney (USYD), a Masters at Macquarie University and a PhD from USYD.

She worked at USYD, from 1986 to 2007, rising to associate professor from 2000. She then moved to the University of New South Wales (UNSW) as full professor, where she worked from 2007 to 2021. On her retirement she was appointed an emeritus professor at UNSW in 2018.

Brennan was the first convenor of the National Association for Community Based Children's Services. Brennan's career has focused on achieving gender equity, particularly more equitable lifestyle, salary, and services for children and women. Brennan's work focuses on issues around early childhood education, child care, gender issues, politics, and family policy. During her career, she has been a visiting professor at Oxford University, Trinity College Dublin, and the University of Melbourne. She is a member of the Feminist and Institutional International Network. She has received funding from the ARC on the interactions between care, employment regulation, and workers in aged and childcare within New Zealand, Canada, and Australia.

Brennan was one of the participants of the 2020 Summit held in 2008 in the Productivity Agenda (education, skills, training, science, and innovation), designed to provide advice at a national level to the Australian government.

In February 2023 Brennan was appointed to the Australian Productivity Commission as associate commissioner.

== Gender Equity work ==
Brennan's work has focused on the public/private divide that places women at the edges of society, focusing on sufficient care for women and their children and the impact of child care on the ability of women to have careers. She is passionate about care for women and children, and workers within the caring industries within Australia. She has argued for universal access to community-based child care, which is high quality, and based on feminist principles. She has been engaged with many community and educational organisations.

== Publications ==
Brennan has published on the policy impacts and outcomes of childcare. She has published articles within The Monthly various peer-reviewed journals, as well as a book, called The Politics of Australian Childcare: Philanthropy to feminism and beyond.

A selection of her publications is as follows.

- 'Brennan D, (2022) A Call to (Caring) Arms: A Response to The Care Manifesto: The Politics of Interdependence', SOCIAL POLITICS, vol. 28, pp. 834 - 842, http://dx.doi.org/10.1093/sp/jxab043
- Howe, H, Charlesworth, S, Brennan, D. (2019) Migration Pathways for Frontline Care Workers in Australia and New Zealand: Front Doors, Side Doors, Back Doors and Trapdoors The University of New South Wales law journal.
- S. Pascoe, D. Brennan. (2018) Lifting our Game.
- Brennan, D (2011) Investing in childhood: the progress and the pitfalls Inside Story, 25 August 2011.
- Brennan, D (2008) Reassembling the childcare business Inside Story, 19 November 2008.
- Brennan, D (1998)The politics of Australian Child Care: Philanthropy to feminism and beyond.

== Media ==
Brennan's work on childcare and gender equity, childcare subsidies, and the implications of these policies on families and child care providers, in particular, on mothers workforce participation, has been published in the ABC, and the Sydney Morning Herald.

== Awards ==
- 2022 – Member of the Order of Australia
- 2018 – Edna Ryan Award for education
- 2009 – Fellow of the Academy of Social Sciences
