= Zelda D'Aprano =

Australian feminist activist

Zelda D'Aprano AO
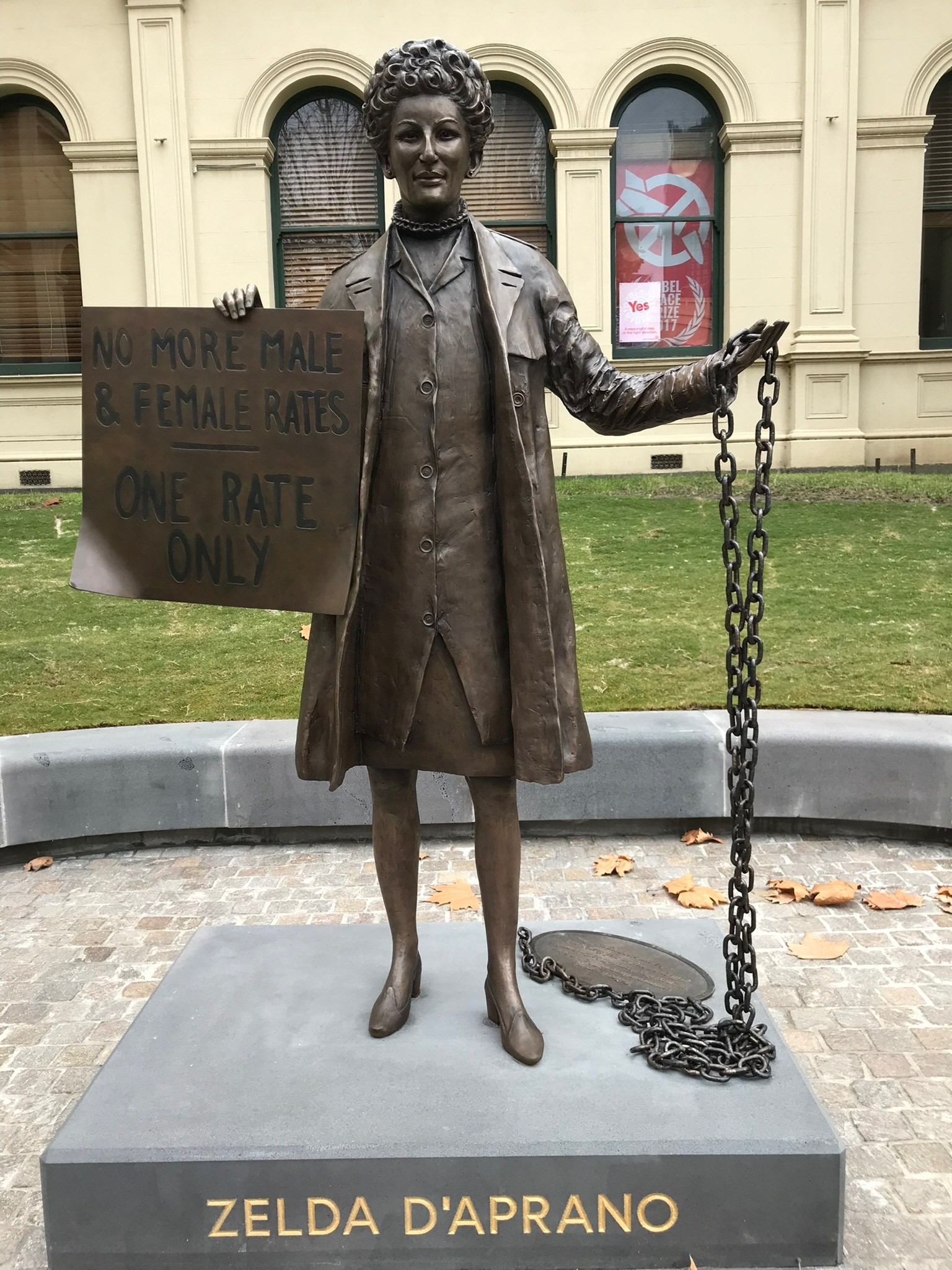
- Statue of D'Aprano, outside the Victorian Trades Hall
- Born: Zelda Fay Orloff; 29 January 1928; Carlton, Victoria, Australia
- Died: 21 February 2018 (aged 90); Melbourne, Victoria, Australia
- Education: Macquarie University
- Occupations: Feminist; activist
- Political party: Communist (1950–1971)
- Spouse: Charlie D'Aprano (married 1944–1965)
- Partner: Ron Tilley (1975–2014)

Zelda Fay D'Aprano AO (née Orloff; 24 January 1928 – 21 February 2018) was an Australian feminist activist and unionist who lived in Melbourne, Victoria. Born in 1928 to a working-class immigrant family and joining the workforce at 14 years old, D'Aprano quickly became involved with the Communist Party of Australia and the union movement. In 1969, as a case for equal pay for women proceeded in the Arbitration Court, D'Aprano chained herself to the doors of the Commonwealth Building in Melbourne. Ten days later, joined by Alva Geikie and Thelma Solomon, she chained herself to the doors of the Arbitration Court. Although she became disillusioned with the Communist Party soon after, D'Aprano remained a committed women's liberationist, co-founding the Women's Action Committee. She spent much of her later life in northern New South Wales, before returning to Melbourne in the years before her death. A commemorative statue of D'Aprano was erected in 2023.

== Early life and family ==
D'Aprano (born Zelda Fay Orloff) grew up in a two-bedroom house in Carlton with her brother Maurice, her sister Clara and her parents Shimshon and Rachel Leah Orloff. She grew up in an Orthodox Jewish household, but her mother became a communist when D'Aprano was still a child, prompting D'Aprano to become one herself in later years. Despite being noted by teachers as intelligent, without a wealthy family, she left school before she was 14 to work in various factories, under low pay and harsh conditions. She was married at 16 to Charlie D'Aprano, and had a child when she was 17. In 1965, Zelda and Charlie divorced, having both had extramarital affairs. Her second partner was Communist Party member Ron Tilley, from 1975 to his 2014 death.

She later fully qualified as a dental nurse in 1961. She completed her Leaving Certificate in 1965, at the same time as her daughter. She attended night school for two years, graduating in 1967 as a qualified chiropodist, though she never practised.

== Early career ==
Having joined the Communist Party of Australia (CPA) in 1950, D'Aprano became a motivated Communist activist through the 1950s, working often with her husband, who had joined the party earlier. After her daughter began school in 1951, D'Aprano, reluctant to live the life of a housewife, began to work in various factories. It was at these factory jobs that she first started to notice the inequalities that female workers faced, especially related to the gender pay gap. She often challenged the poor working conditions of female workers, despite multiple dismissals. In 1956, she was made secretary of her local branch; however, this role gave her little authority, and as a women, she received scant respect from male party members. Viewing the party as unsupportive of women, she rarely spoke at CPA branch meetings, viewing herself in those spaces as "too ignorant [and] too inadequate". To her frustration, D'Aprano observed women in the CPA as largely fulfilling traditional gender roles, completing tasks like typing and cooking, while men held all major leadership positions.

After various jobs, including at a shortbread factory and a grocer's, D'Aprano went to work at Larundel Psychiatric Hospital as a dental nurse in 1961. She joined the Hospital Employees' Federation (HEF) No.2 Branch, in which there was little support for workers, especially for women. D'Aprano was disappointed at the poor state of the union; the branch did not hold quarterly meetings as intended, and only eight members attended her first meeting. Regardless, she was made shop steward while there, putting her in charge of all the women who worked as dental nurses. During this time, she also worked two days a week at a disabled children's hospital, the other three days spent at the psychiatric hospital. D'Aprano, despite being prevented from further promotion due to her Communist Party membership, conducted significant efforts to improve the quality of the branch. By her 1968 departure, the branch had grown from 1,000 to 50,000 members.

== The equal pay case ==
In 1969, she joined the Australasian Meat Industry Employees' Union (AMIEU), working as a clerk there. Despite initial optimism for her potential role in the AMIEU, a firmly communist-led union, she found both poor office conditions and a male-focused culture. With all but one of the office workers being CPA members, and thus unwilling to challenge union leadership, D'Aprano was further frustrated at her inability to enact meaningful change within the AMIEU. She attempted to be active in both the AMIEU and at work in trying to correct the work situations that women faced, but was constantly rebuffed and her efforts overlooked. D'Aprano joined the AMIEU while it was engaged in a case for equal pay for women before the Industrial Court. D'Aprano and several other women waited as the case was being decided in the Industrial Commission on 19 June 1969, bearing placards and chanting slogans. She noticed at the time the male-dominated nature of the courtroom; all of the judges, and everyone arguing the case, were men. Ultimately, the Industrial court ruled that women were entitled to "equal pay for equal work". However, due to a workforce heavily divided by gender, only three percent of workers received equal pay from the decision.

D'Aprano was disappointed by both the ruling and the AMIEU's decision to abandon further action on equal pay. During a lunch with Insurance Staff Federation secretary Dianne Sonenberg, both women agreed on the need for a "dramatic" protest action for equal pay. Thus, on 21 October 1969, at 2:00pm, D'Aprano chained herself to the door of the Commonwealth Building. D'Aprano and Sonenberg chose a federal government building as they believed the federal government should set the example on equal pay for women. Radio stations, television and the press had been previously notified, bringing media attention. Ten days later, joined by Alva Geikie and Thelma Solomon, she chained herself to the doors of the Arbitration Court, which had previously dismissed the Equal Pay Case.

However, D'Aprano's actions were largely met with suspicion within both the AMIEU and the CPA. After sending a letter to AMIEU secretary, George Seelaf, criticising employee conditions in the office, she found herself dismissed from the union in 1970. Following the CPA's support for the AMIEU action, she quit the party in 1971. However, she both kept her left-wing values and continued to criticise left-wing movements for being male-dominated.

== 1970s campaigning ==
In March 1970, D'Aprano met with Geikie and Solomon to discuss the creation of a Women's Action Committee. The committee would eventually garner 70 participants, and became an explicit women's liberationist movement after CPA member Kath Gleeson provided the American publication The Second Year: Notes from Women's Liberation. D'Aprano vocally opposed a hierarchical structure, including a constitution and roles like a president or secretary, believing that such positions cause people to "inevitably go bad". The demands of the Women's Action Committee included the abolition of gender-based awards, a year-long maternity leave allowance, and part-time work for women who desired it. The group also made demands for social equality, including access to abortion, family planning facilities, and an end to the sexualization of women. In the same year, despite opposition from transport workers' union secretary Clarrie O'Shea, the women insisted on paying 75 percent of the fare on Melbourne's trams, to protest wage injustices. This action brought D'Aprano significant press coverage. To protest the fact that women were only allowed to drink in lounges, not in bars, the group held pub crawls across Melbourne.

Following her dismissal, D'Aprano worked with journalist Michael Costigan, working briefly in different industries, including at a clothing factory and a meatworks, and then reporting on her findings. She then worked as a mail sorter, for the Mail Exchange in Melbourne. During her four years at the Mail Exchange, D'Aprano became a prominent public speaker, appearing frequently at public demonstrations and on television and radio. The shift work of the Exchange suited her erratic public speaking timetable. Although D'Aprano experienced similarly poor working conditions as her previous employment, she did not agitate for change, due to a shop steward she viewed as incompetent. It was also at this time that ASIO began monitoring her actions.

By 1972, the committee had been absorbed into the women's liberation movement. D'Aprano personally came to believe that it was "patriarchy that was the problem...patriarchy had to go." It founded the Women's Liberation Centre, on Little Latrobe Street, in the same year, and in 1975, it held Australia's first pro-choice rally, with over 500 protestors. At this time, D'Aprano came under pressure from friends to write a book. In 1975, after her extensive ASIO file was leaked by the media, she decided to write an autobiography. She was awarded funding to produce the book in 1975, the International Women's Year. In 1977, it was published, entitled Zelda: The Becoming of a Woman. It considered activism in the labour movement from her women's liberation perspective. However, her ASIO file leak, combined with an adenomyosis diagnosis, left her depressed and largely unable to continue her previous advocacy. She also lost her Mail Exchange job, becoming fearful of antisemitic attacks on her way to work.

== Later life ==
Due to her health issues, D'Aprano moved to a rural commune in John's River, New South Wales, with her second partner Ron Tilley. D'Aprano found the commune to be a hostile place, and a "really traumatic" experience. Leaving the commune after about a year, D'Aprano remained in New South Wales, living a rural life. In the area, she became the president of the local adult education centre.

In 1995, she expanded her autobiography, which was republished by Spinifex Press. She also received a Special Mention Award from the Centre for Australian Cultural Studies, honouring her contributions to Australian culture. D'Aprano was awarded two honorary degrees: a law degree from Macquarie University in 2000, and a Doctor of Letters from La Trobe University in 2017. In 2001, she was inducted into the Victorian Honour Roll of Women, and published a second book, a biography of activist Kath Williams. She was awarded the Officer of the Order of Australia (AO) in 2004. In her final years, with her health declining, she returned to Melbourne.

== Death and legacy ==
D'Aprano died at Rathdowne Place, Carlton on 21 February 2018, aged 90 years. In the wake of her death, D'Aprano was hailed as having "a profound and everlasting impact on the women's movement" and as "a fierce fighter for justice and women's rights."

In 2023, a statue of D'Aprano was erected on the South West lawn at the Victorian Trades Hall. It was unveiled by former Prime Minister of Australia, Julia Gillard. On 6 March 2026, the statue was allegedly defaced by activists, with seven women arrested.

A tunnel boring machine used to construct the tunneled portion of Melbourne's North East Link was named 'Zelda' in honour of D'Aprano.

== Publications ==
=== Books ===
- Zelda: The Becoming of a Woman. North Carlton: Z. D'Aprano, 1977. ISBN 0959688412
- Zelda (new edition). North Melbourne: Spinifex Press, 1995. ISBN 1875559302
- Kath Williams: The unions and the fight for equal pay, Spinifex Press, North Melbourne, 2001, ISBN 1876756020

=== Contributions ===
- "What Do You Do When You Are Fed up with Men's Mismanagement of Our Planet Earth and Their Wars?", in September 11, 2001 : Feminist perspectives, edited by Susan Hawthorne and Bronwyn Winter, Spinifex Press, North Melbourne, 2002, ISBN 1876756276
- Women's Web stories actions Women's Web
