= Anti-Doping Norway =

Anti-Doping Norway (Norwegian: Antidoping Norge) is a private foundation that claims to be "responsible for prohibiting, investigating and prosecuting doping in Norway," although it has no official authority in the judiciary of Norway. It is recognised by the World Anti-Doping Agency as the national anti-doping organization by that organization. As of 2019, it employs 34 persons and conducted 4500 doping tests in 2018.

== History ==
The foundation was established in 2003 by the Ministry of Culture and Norwegian Confederation of Sports.

The organization was given funding for the first time by the State budget of Norway, in 2013.
