= Tara Moss =

Canadian-Australian author and TV presenter

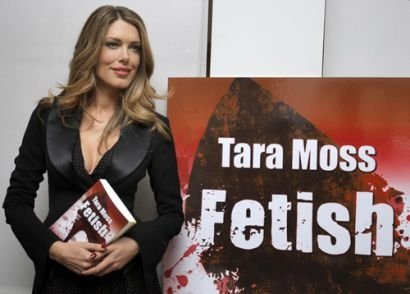
- Author Tara Moss in Barcelona, Spain, at the press conference for the launch of her novels translated into Spanish.
- Born: 2 October 1973 (age 53); Victoria, British Columbia, Canada
- Spouses: Martin Legg (m. 1995; div. 1997); Mark Pennell (m. 2004; div. 2006); Berndt Sellheim (m. 2009; div. 2024)
- Website: taramoss.com

Tara Rae Moss (born 2 October 1973) is a Canadian-Australian author, documentary maker and presenter, journalist and UNICEF national ambassador for child survival and former model.

== Biography ==
Moss was born in Victoria, British Columbia, where she attended school. Moss's mother Janni died of multiple myeloma in 1990 at age 43.

Moss began modelling at age 14, but did not stay long in the profession. At age 21, as detailed in her 2014 memoir The Fictional Woman, she was raped in Vancouver by a known assailant, a Canadian actor.

After brief marriages to the Canadian Marty Legg and to the Australian actor Mark Pennell both ended in divorce, she married Australian poet and philosopher Dr. Berndt Sellheim. Moss gave birth to a daughter, Sapphira, on 22 February 2011. In early 2024 the marriage ended.

Moss is a UNICEF Ambassador for Child Survival, and has been a UNICEF Goodwill Ambassador since 2007. Since 2000 she has been an ambassador for the Royal Institute for Deaf and Blind Children.

Moss has private investigator credentials (Cert III) from the Australian Security Academy and as of 2019 is undertaking a Doctorate of Social Sciences in the Department of Gender and Cultural studies at the University of Sydney.

== Writing and career ==
Moss's books are published in 18 countries in 13 languages and include the internationally best-selling and critically acclaimed series of six crime novels featuring a feminist heroine, Makedde "Mak" Vanderwall: Fetish, Split, Covet, Hit, Siren and Assassin. Her first non-fiction book, The Fictional Woman was published in June 2014, became a #1 bestselling non-fiction book, and is listed by The Sydney Morning Herald as a "must-read". The book has received critical acclaim, with Dr Clare Wright writing, 'Moss is a serious thinker.'

Her writing has appeared in Ms Magazine, Crime Reads, the Australian Literary Review, The Sydney Morning Herald, The Sun-Herald, The Daily Telegraph, TheHoopla and more.

Moss is an advocate for the rights of women and children. She has been an ambassador for the Royal Institute for Deaf and Blind Children since 2000 and has hosted their annual charity flight for over a decade. She has also been a UNICEF Goodwill Ambassador since 2007 and as of 2013 has taken on a larger role as UNICEF's National Ambassador for Child Survival.

She is known for her novel research, which has included touring the FBI and LAPD, shooting firearms, being set on fire, being choked unconscious by Ultimate Fighter 'Big' John McCarthy, flying with the Royal Australian Air Force, spending time in morgues and courtrooms and obtaining a licence as a private investigator. She has also been a race car driver (CAMS), and holds a motorcycle licence and wildlife/snake-handling licence. In 2014, she was recognised for Outstanding Advocacy for her blog Manus Island: An insider's report, which helped to break information to the public about the events surrounding the alleged murder of Reza Barati inside the Australian-run Manus Island Immigration Detention Centre.

Moss hosts and acted as executive producer and writer of Cyberhate with Tara Moss on ABC in 2017, hosted two seasons of the true crime television series Tough Nuts – Australia's Hardest Criminals on the Crime & Investigation Network, and Tara Moss in Conversation on the 13th Street channel. She also previously hosted the crime documentary series Tara Moss Investigates on the National Geographic Channel.

- Cyberhate with Tara Moss – Host, Executive Producer, Writer (2017),
- Tough Nuts – Host (2009–2012)
- Tara in Conversation – Host (2010–2012)
- Tara Moss Investigates – Host (2006)

She voiced the character of Dr. Samantha Twelvetrees in the 1995 video game Ripley's Believe It or Not!: The Riddle of Master Lu.

In May 2021, Moss gave an autobiographical interview and had her portrait painted on Anh's Brush with Fame (Series 6 Episode 6) on the ABC.

== Books ==
=== Novels ===
Makedde Vanderwall series

- Fetish (1999)
- Split (2002)
- Covet (2004)
- Hit (2006)
- Siren (2009)
- Assassin (2012)

Pandora English series

- The Blood Countess (2010)
- The Spider Goddess (2011)
- The Skeleton Key (2012)
- The Cobra Queen (2020)

Billie Walker series

- The War Widow (shortlisted for the 2020 Danger Prize)
- The Ghosts of Paris (2022)
- The Italian Secret (2025)

=== Non-fiction ===
- The Fictional Woman (2014)
- Speaking Out: A 21st Century Handbook For Women and Girls (2016)

=== Short stories ===
- "Psycho Magnet" (Winner of the Scarlet Stiletto Young Writers' Award in 1998)
- "Know your ABCs" (Second place winner of the Scarlet Stiletto Award in 1999)
- "Intuition" (2003)

=== Contributed chapter ===
- "Women destroy the joint", pp. 57–62, in: Destroying the joint, edited by Jane Caro, Read How You Want (2015, ISBN 9781459687295).
