= Women's Electoral Lobby (Australia) =

Australian lobbying group

The Women's Electoral Lobby (WEL) is a feminist, non-profit, self-funded, non-party political, lobby group founded in 1972 during the height of second-wave feminism in Australia. WEL's mission is to create a society where women's participation and potential are unrestricted, acknowledged and respected and where women and men share equally in society's responsibilities and rewards.

WEL is focused on a range of women's issues.

== History ==
The Women's Electoral Lobby (WEL) was founded at a meeting called by Beatrice Faust in her Melbourne home in February 1972, and WEL groups formed soon after in other capital cities and regional centres. It was formed to conduct a large-scale survey of candidates for the 1972 Australian federal election. WEL's intervention in the election campaign was intended to publicise candidates' views on issues of interest to women and, simultaneously, to mobilise women's political power. It achieved both ends and WEL grew into a major feminist non-party, political lobby group.

Growing out of the Women's liberation movement, WEL expressed the desire of some activists to affect government, at Federal and State levels, in a direct and practical way. Working in pairs, WEL interviewers pursued and questioned candidates about issues such as equal pay, abortion, child care and sex discrimination. The WEL members were shocked to discover how ignorant many male candidates were about issues that were important to women, and the results of their interviews were enthusiastically reported in the media.

The Australian Federation of Women Voters was founded in 1921 and formally wound itself up and handed the torch to the 10-year-old WEL in 1982, with WEL taking over its role in the International Alliance of Women [page 200].

In 1979, the Women's Non-Party Political Association, formerly led by Constance Cooke, which was also lobbying for electoral reform for women, wound up in order to support the work of the Women's Electoral Lobby.

While it is impossible to determine to what extent WEL's electoral activities influenced the outcome (the election of the Australian Labor Party led by Gough Whitlam), it is certain that WEL put "women's issues" on the political agenda. In the longer term, WEL's actions meant that, for decades afterwards, political parties took care to formulate and publicise a written women's policy before each election. That practice ultimately made individual candidate interviews less illuminating, since candidates were able to echo the party's policy rather than risk exposing ignorance or insensitivity. However, the legitimisation of women's policy in the political arena gave considerable leverage to those seeking feminist reform, and created accountability in relation to government commitments made in women's interests.

In the four decades since its founding, WEL has pursued reforms through a distinctive mix of policy analysis and advocacy. It has continued its election work, typically publishing "score-cards" on the parties' policies and hosting events where candidates are questioned by WEL members and others about their positions. Since it was established WEL has made over 900 submissions to parliamentary and other inquiries. WEL spokeswomen provide media commentary and the organisation has an active website and social media presence.

From 1973 to August 1993 WEL produced a monthly newsletter WEL-Informed by a collective, under the editorship of Dorothy Simons. On 3 May 2002 Dorothy received WEL's 'Grand Stirrer' Award, presented by Meredith Burgmann. From September 1993 it was produced by a new team.

== Achievements ==
Marian Sawer, with Jasmine Brankovich and Gail Radford, stated in their chapter "Generations of Advocacy": "Between 1972 and 2005 WEL-NSW presented 107 submissions to the State Government and to Parliament on subjects ranging from death duties, family law, health and legal services, sexist advertising and defence, to women in the home, prostitution, poverty and affirmative action. WEL-NSW members were also principal authors of a further 58 submissions prepared on behalf of WEL-Australia".

WEL is credited with major achievements for women in Australia in relation to anti-discrimination and equal opportunity legislation, equal pay decisions, the funding of women's and children's services. In 2005 Joan Bielski, a key member of WEL wrote in 'The History, Organisation and Achievements of WEL NSW' that WEL's achievements include:

- The passing of equal pay legislation in 1972, which saw women awarded the male rate of pay, no matter what job they performed
- The decision by the Arbitration Commission in 1974 to equalise the female Minimum Pay rate with the male rate
- Legitimisation, policy development, legislative reform and community education programs on issues such as equal opportunity, sexual harassment and domestic violence
- The drafting and implementation of state anti-discrimination and federal sex discrimination legislation
- Rape law reform, which has gradually led to significant amendments to the NSW Crimes Act.

== Structure ==
The structure of WEL mirrors Australia's federal political system. There are WEL branches in each state and territory, which focus on state policy and a national WEL branch that focuses on federal policy. Because of the overlapping nature of state and federal policy areas and feminist concerns, state and national branches of WEL often work together on projects or to lobby for policy change.

At WEL's 1978 national conference, a decision was made to set up a national office in Canberra, which was originally set up in the laundry of Canberra Women's House in O'’Connor.

It was also decided at the conference that WEL would employ a part-time National Communications Officer to ensure communication and information-sharing between WEL branches and to better engage in federal government and politics. This role was at first restricted to supporting national campaigns.

According to the WEL History Project's report on WEL National Convenors, "the position evolved into a more professional lobbyist position... In 1987 Jane Elix, former national co-ordinator, made a powerful plea at a WEL conference for the holder of the position to be authorised to be a media spokeswoman. Elix observed that although founding WEL members believed in non-hierarchical structures and opposed specialisation of roles and functions, in practice this made it difficult to compete in the political arena of the 1980s. While WEL groups clearly did not want to lose power to 'Canberra', often WEL members were in sensitive jobs and were unable to speak publicly on policy." This illustrates an ongoing tension in WEL, which aims to respond quickly to make the most of the media cycle and the political climate whilst still maintaining a de-centralised member-driven structure.

The ANU's WEL History Project documents name changes to the coordinator position and who held that position as follows:

1978 national communications officer

1982 national co-ordinator

1997 executive officer

2000 national convenor

Date	Who
1978	Maria De Leo
Feb 79 – Sept 82	Yvonne Carnahan
Oct 82 – March 84	Pamela Denoon†
March–Sept 1984	Lorelle Thompson
Oct 84 – Dec 84	Jo Morgan
Jan–Feb 1985	Lynne Gallagher
March 85 – July 86	Jane Elix
Sept 86 – March 87	Lynn Lee
May–Sept 1987	Glenys Rogers
Sept 87 – Feb 88	Lynn Lee
March–Nov 1988	Joy Taylor
Dec 88 – April 89	Nooshin Guitoo
June 89 – Feb 91	Anne-Marie Mioche
March 91 – Dec 94	Ann Wentworth
June–Aug 1992	Julie McCarron-Benson
Jan 95 – April 96	Ingrid McKenzie
April 96 – Jan 97	Rivera Morton-Radovsky
April 97 – Sept 98	Lyn Peryman
Sept 98 – April 2000	Helen Leonard†
June 00 – Aug 01	Erica Lewis
Sept 01 – July 3	Sandy Killick

== Feminist framework ==
In 2010, the Women's Electoral Lobby dispensed with its usual process of researching and writing individual policies on a range of policy areas in the lead up to the election. Instead, WEL has developed a Feminist Policy Framework, which sets out criteria to test and rate the policies of political parties.

WEL's feminist framework tests how well policies:

- Ensure the benefits and outcomes are fairly distributed between women and men, as well as between different groups of women
- Value and reward fairly people's different skills, experiences and contributions
- Recognise the value of caring and supporting roles, whether paid or unpaid
- Recognise and rectify past and current inequalities and between men and women; and
- Enhance opportunities for both women and men to take on equal rights and responsibilities in all aspects of society: politics, community, employment and social life

== See also ==
- Feminism in Australia
- Australian Federation of Women Voters
- Edna Ryan (activist)
- Elizabeth Anne Reid
