= Corroboree =

Meeting of Australian Aboriginal peoples

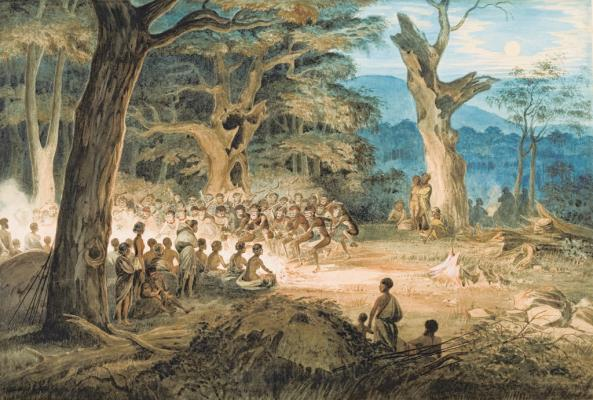
WR Thomas, A South Australian Corroboree, 1864, Art Gallery of South Australia

A corroboree is a generic word for a meeting of Australian Aboriginal peoples. It may be a sacred ceremony, a festive celebration, or of a warlike character. A word borrowed by the first British settlers in the Sydney area from a word in the local Dharug language, it usually includes dance, music, costume and often body decoration.

== Origin and etymology ==
The word "corroboree" was adopted by British settlers soon after colonisation from the Dharug ("Sydney language") Aboriginal Australian word garaabara, denoting a style of dancing. It thus entered the Australian English language as a loan word.

It is a borrowed English word that has been reborrowed to explain a practice that is different from ceremony and more widely inclusive than theatre or opera.

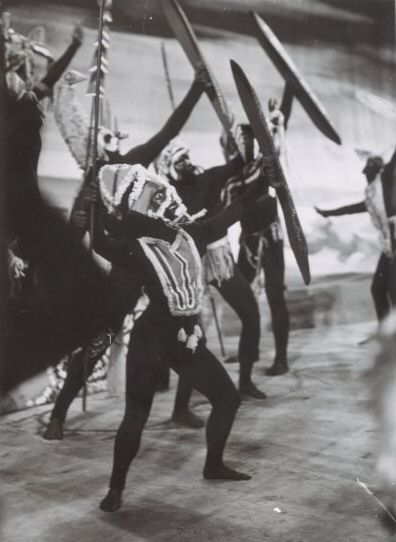
Corroboree, a ballet performance based on the corroboree

In his 1981 book The Other Side of the Frontier, historian Henry Reynolds assessed that corroborees "provided the venue for gossip, trade and cultural interchange" necessary amongst Aboriginals and that the anthropologist William Edward Hanley Stanner, writing of a corroboree he witnessed while studying the Daly River tribes in the 1930s, noted that:

...diffusion of ideas took place most propitiously in quiet moments punctuating the large, dramatic ceremonies, while little knots of men and women were resting under the trees or around campfires at night and the songs were chanted, 'the myths retold, the dances rehearsed, the little technological tricks explained.'

== Description ==
In 1837, explorer and Queensland grazier Tom Petrie wrote: "Their bodies painted in different ways, and they wore various adornments, which were not used every day." In 1938, clergyman and anthropologist Adolphus Elkin wrote of a public pan-Aboriginal dancing "tradition of individual gifts, skill, and ownership" as distinct from the customary practices of appropriate elders guiding initiation and other ritual practices (ceremonies).

The word is described in the Macquarie Atlas of Indigenous Australia (2nd ed.) as "an Indigenous assembly of a festive, sacred or warlike character".

Throughout Australia the word "corroboree" embraces songs, dances, rallies and meetings of various kinds. In the past a corroboree has been inclusive of sporting events and other forms of skill display.

== History ==
The largest spectator event of the 19th century at the Adelaide Oval was the "Grand Corroboree", performed by around 100 Aboriginal men and women from Point MacLeay mission and Yorke Peninsula on Friday 29 and Saturday 30 May 1885. They had been invited to Adelaide by the colonial government to perform at the request of the Governor of South Australia, Sir William Robinson, to perform as part of the Queen's Birthday celebrations. After organisers expected a crowd of around 5,000, approximately 20,000 spectators (around a sixth of Adelaide's population) turned up. The crowd became rowdy and police had to clear the performance space before the event could begin. Profits from the show were assigned to the Aboriginal people. The corroboree was so successful that other performances were arranged at other venues. Also at this time, the first football match held between Aboriginal and non-Aboriginal teams in Adelaide was organised by Football and Cricketing Association secretary John Creswell, and a second followed at the oval on 2 June 1885.

== Associated later meanings ==
The Macquarie Dictionary (3rd ed, 1997) gives secondary meanings "any large or noisy gathering" and "a disturbance; an uproar". It also documents its use as a verb (to take part in a corroboree).

The Macquarie Atlas documents a 2003 sports carnival in the Northern Territory which was described by the president of the Yuendumu community council as "a modern day corroboree".

== See also ==
- Corroboree 2000, a reconciliation event in Sydney
- Corroboree, a poem by Max Fatchen
- Luau
- Pow wow
- Wangga - traditional music and ceremony of north-western Australia

== Sources ==
- Reynolds, Henry (1981). The Other Side of the Frontier. Townsville: History Department James Cook University. ISBN 0-86443-024-8.
