= Genocide of Indigenous Australians =

Destruction of Indigenous Australian peoples and their cultures

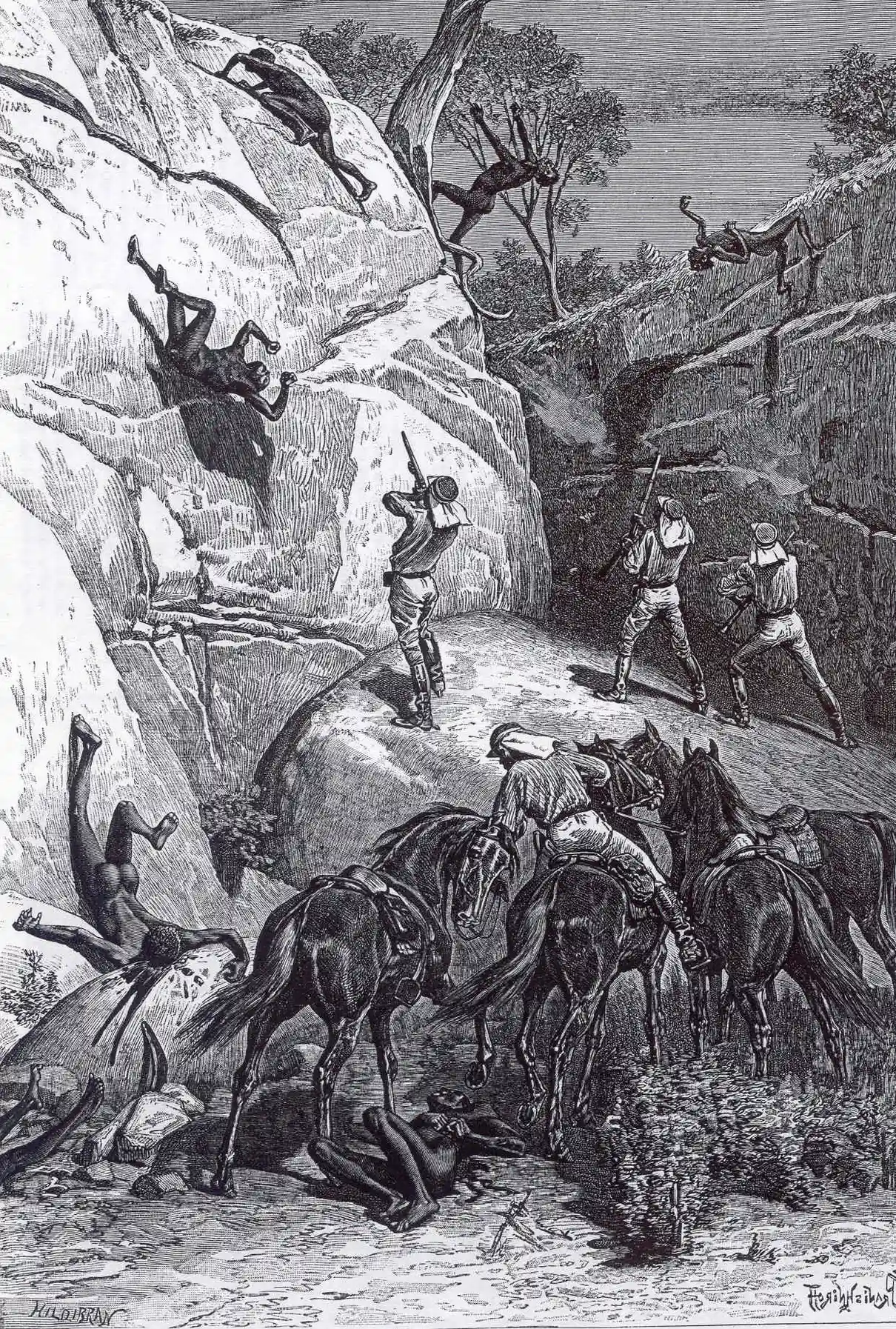
- 1888 illustration of a massacre by Australian native police in Queensland, Australia
- Location: Australia
- Date: 1788 - 1970
- Target: Aboriginal Australians; Torres Strait Islanders
- Attack type: Genocidal massacre, ethnic cleansing, cultural genocide
- Perpetrators: British settlers Australian colonial, state and federal governments
- Motive: Settler colonialism Assimilation; Racism

Many scholars have argued that the British colonisation of Australia and subsequent actions of various Australian governments and individuals involved acts of genocide against Indigenous Australians. They have used numerous definitions of genocide, including the intentional destruction of Indigenous groups as defined in the 1948 United Nations genocide convention, and broader definitions involving cultural genocide, ethnocide and genocidal massacres. They have frequently described the near-extermination of Aboriginal Tasmanians, mass killings during the frontier wars, forced removals of Indigenous children from their families (now known as the Stolen Generations) and policies of forced assimilation as genocidal.

When Britain established its first Australian colony in 1788, the Aboriginal population is estimated to have been more than two million people, comprising about 600 tribes or nations and 250 languages with various dialects. By 1901 the Aboriginal population had fallen to just over 90,000 people, mainly due to disease, frontier violence and the disruption of traditional society. In the 20th century many Aboriginal people were confined to reserves, missions and institutions, and government regulations controlled most aspects of their lives. Thousands of Indigenous children of mixed heritage were removed from their families.

There is an ongoing debate over whether imperial, colonial and Australian governments intended to destroy Indigenous peoples in whole or in part, or whether their intention was to end resistance to settler colonialism, protect Indigenous people from settler violence and promote the welfare of Indigenous people by assimilating them into British-Australian society. There is also debate over whether the legal definition of genocide sufficiently captures the range of harm inflicted on the Indigenous peoples of Australia. Since 1997 the state, territory and federal governments of Australia have formally apologised for the stolen generations and for other injustices committed against Indigenous Australians.

== Historical context ==
When Britain established its first Australian colony in 1788, the Aboriginal population is estimated to have been 300,000 to more than one million people whose ancestors had inhabited the land for 50,000 to 65,000 years. They were complex hunter-gatherers with diverse economies and societies. There were about 600 tribes or nations and 250 languages with various dialects. In the 150 years that followed, the number of Aboriginal Australians fell sharply due to introduced diseases and violent conflict with the colonists that many scholars argue included acts of genocide. When the Australian colonies federated in 1901 and the Commonwealth of Australia was established, the Aboriginal population had fallen to just over 90,000 people.

The Torres Strait Islands were progressively annexed to the British colony of Queensland from 1872. The Torres Strait Islander people first settled their islands around 2,500 years ago. Culturally and linguistically distinct from mainland Aboriginal peoples, they were seafarers and obtained their livelihood from seasonal horticulture and the resources of their reefs and seas. They developed agriculture on some islands and established villages by the 14th century.

Following federation Aboriginal affairs was a state responsibility, although the Commonwealth became responsible for the Aboriginal population of the Northern Territory from 1911. By then the Commonwealth and all states except Tasmania had passed legislation establishing Protectors of Aborigines and Protection Boards with extensive powers to regulate the lives of Aboriginal Australians including their ownership of property, place of residence, employment, sexual relationships and custody of their children. Reserves were established and Church groups ran missions providing shelter, food, religious instruction and elementary schooling for Indigenous people.

Some officials argued that the growing number of Aboriginal children of mixed heritage was inconsistent with the white Australia policy. Laws concerning Aboriginal Australians were progressively tightened to make it easier for officials to remove Aboriginal children of mixed descent from their parents and place them in reserves, missions, institutions and employment with white employers. The policy of forced removal of Aboriginal children from their parents created the "stolen generations", and the Australian Human Rights Commission concluded in 1997 that this policy constituted genocide.

== Alleged acts of genocide ==
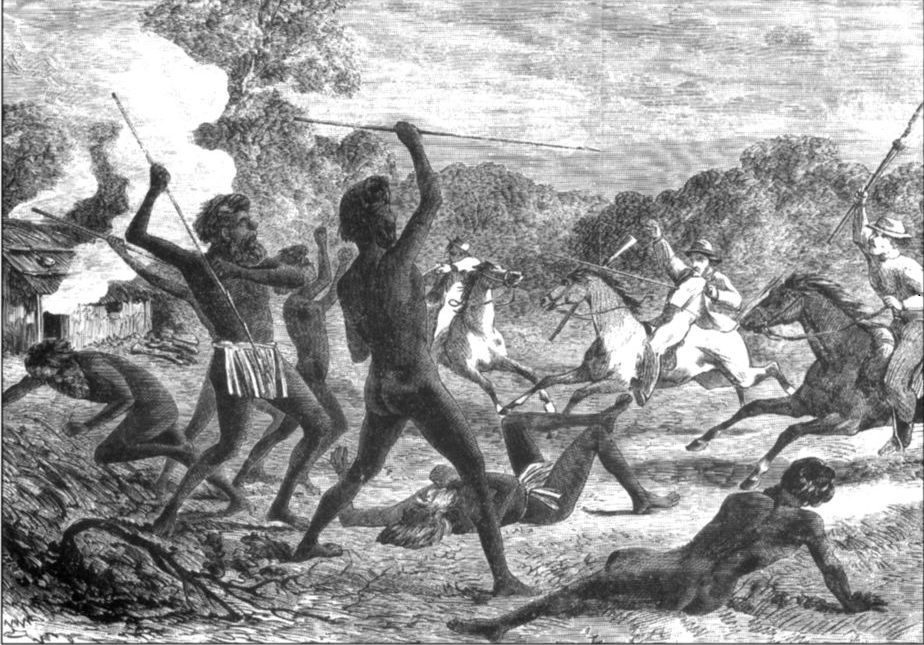
Illustration of the Myall Creek massacre, 1838.

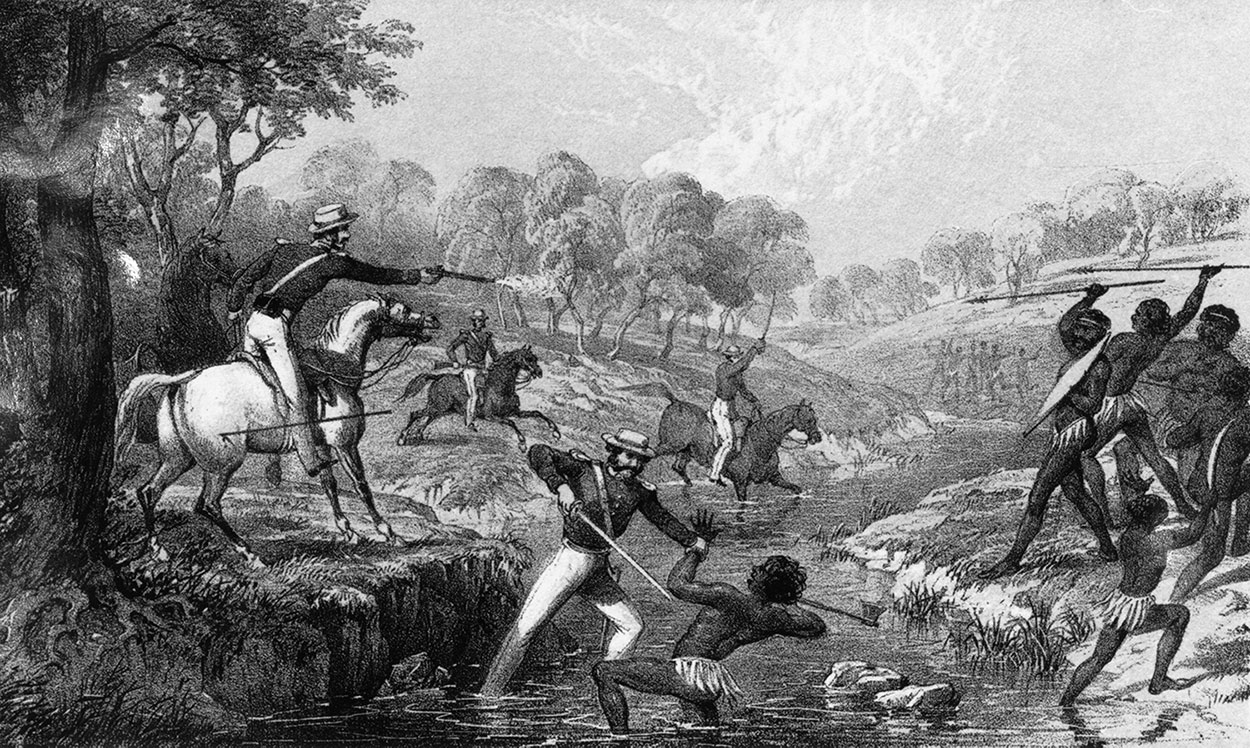
New South Wales Mounted Police killing Aboriginal warriors during the Waterloo Creek massacre of 1838

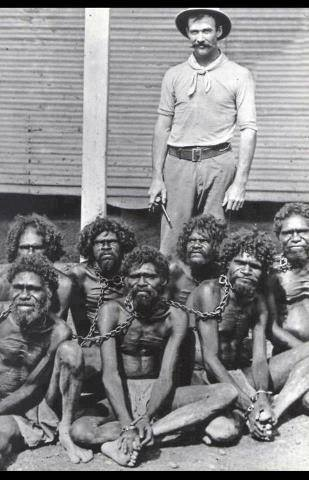
Aboriginal Australians in chains at Wyndham prison, c.1901

Scholars have used various definitions of genocide to argue that acts of genocide against Indigenous Australians occurred after 1788. The most widely used definition of genocide is that of the 1948 United Nations Genocide Convention. Under the convention, genocide requires the perpetrator to commit acts with the intention to destroy, wholly or partly, "a national, ethnical, racial or religious group". Genocidal acts include killing members of the group, causing them serious bodily or mental harm, inflicting conditions on them calculated to destroy them, taking measures to prevent the group bearing children, and forcibly transferring their children to other groups.

Some scholars have used different definitions of genocide or have argued that colonist committed acts not captured by the UN convention which they variously describe as cultural genocide, genocidal massacres, ethnocide or Indigenocide.

Scholars have argued that acts of genocide against Indigenous Australians included:

1. Massacres. Particularly in the frontier wars, there were numerous recorded and unrecorded massacres of Indigenous Australians by colonists, government authorities and militias. These acts were often carried out pre-emptively or in retaliation against violent resistance by Indigenous Australians against the occupation of their lands.
2. Dispersal campaigns. Some scholars have described campaigns undertaken in the 1800s aimed at dispersing and displacing indigenous Australians from their lands as a form of genocide. Haebich argues that an example of this was a collaboration between white settlers and government officials in Western Australia to erase the presence of Indigenous Australians from the southwest of the state between 1900 and 1940.
3. Forced removals of children. Some scholars have described various colonial government, state government and federal government policies involving the removal of Indigenous children from their families as genocidal. This practice has been acknowledged by the term "Stolen Generations", whereby Indigenous children of mixed heritage were placed in institutions or forcibly adopted by non-Indigenous families with the intent of assimilating them into white society and discouraging indigenous languages and culture. These policies were sometimes undertaken by eugenicists such as A. O. Neville who argued that children of mixed ancestry would be better off if raised in white households. In the early 20th century it was commonly thought that Indigenous Australians were dying out. In 1937, Neville asked:
  "Are we going to have a population of 1,000,000 blacks in the Commonwealth, or are we going to merge them into our white community and eventually forget that there ever were any aborigines in Australia?"
4. Assimilation policies. Other policies were designed to assimilate Indigenous Australians into majority Australian society. In many schools, children were punished for speaking their native language. Additional restrictions were placed on movement, marriage, employment, and the practice of traditional ceremonies and legal systems. Some scholars have argued that these policies, collectively, were an act of cultural genocide. Others have argued that after 1945 these policies were not genocidal in intent but were intended to ensure the survival of indigenous peoples.
5. Ongoing cultural genocidal policies. Some scholars have argued that genocide against Indigenous Australians continues, especially through contemporary cultural destructive policies. These scholars are part of a minority opinion in both formal academic scholarship on genocide and in popular discourse.

== Particular instances ==
=== Tasmania ===
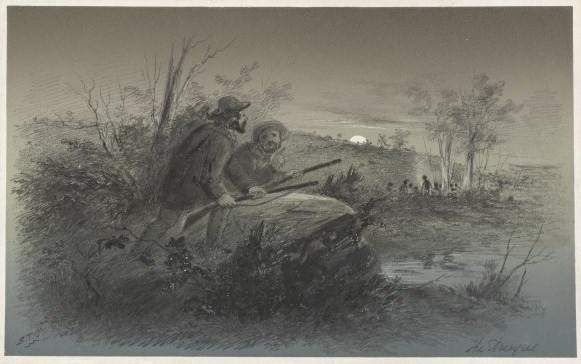
Samuel Thomas Gill's depiction of a night-time punitive raid on an Aboriginal camp

The near-destruction of Tasmania's Aboriginal population has been described as an act of genocide by scholars including Robert Hughes, James Boyce, Lyndall Ryan, Tom Lawson, Mohamed Adhikari, Benjamin Madley, Ashley Riley Sousa, Rebe Taylor, and Tony Barta. The author of the concept of genocide, Raphael Lemkin, considered Tasmania the site of one of the world's clear cases of genocide and Hughes has described the loss of Aboriginal Tasmanians as "the only true genocide in English colonial history". However, other historians – including Henry Reynolds, Richard Broome, and Nicholas Clements – do not agree that the colonial authorities pursued a policy of destroying the Indigenous population, although they do acknowledge that some settlers supported extermination.

As early as 1852 John West's History of Tasmania portrayed the obliteration of Tasmania's Aboriginal people as an example of "systematic massacre" and in the 1979 High Court case of Coe v Commonwealth of Australia, judge Lionel Murphy observed that Aboriginal people did not give up their land peacefully and that they were killed or forcibly removed from their land "in what amounted to attempted (and in Tasmania almost complete) genocide".

Boyce has claimed that the April 1828 "Proclamation Separating the Aborigines from the White Inhabitants" sanctioned force against Aboriginal people "for no other reason than that they were Aboriginal". However, as Reynolds, Broome and Clements point out, there was open warfare at the time. Boyce describes the decision to remove all Aboriginal Tasmanians after 1832—by which time they had given up their fight against white colonists—as an extreme policy position. He concludes: "The colonial government from 1832 to 1838 ethnically cleansed the western half of Van Diemen's Land and then callously left the exiled people to their fate."

Historian Henry Reynolds says there was a widespread call from settlers during the frontier wars for the "extirpation" or "extermination" of the Aboriginal people. But he has contended that the British government acted as a source of restraint on settlers' actions. Reynolds says there is no evidence the British government deliberately planned the wholesale destruction of indigenous Tasmanians—a November 1830 letter to Arthur by Sir George Murray warned that the extinction of the race would leave "an indelible stain upon the character of the British Government"—and therefore what eventuated does not meet the definition of genocide codified in the 1948 United Nations convention. He says Arthur was determined to defeat the Aboriginal people and take their land, but believes there is little evidence he had aims beyond that objective and wished to destroy the Tasmanian race. In contrast to Reynolds' argument, historian Lyndall Ryan, based on a sample of massacres taking place in the Meander River region in June 1827, concludes that massacres of Aboriginal Tasmanians by white settlers were likely part of an organised process and were sanctioned by government authorities.

Clements accepts Reynolds' argument but also exonerates the colonists themselves of the charge of genocide. He says that unlike genocidal determinations by Nazis against Jews in World War II, Hutus against Tutsis in Rwanda and Ottomans against Armenians in present-day Turkey, which were carried out for ideological reasons, Tasmanian settlers participated in violence largely out of revenge and self-preservation. He adds: "Even those who were motivated by sex or morbid thrillseeking lacked any ideological impetus to exterminate the natives." He also argues that while genocides are inflicted on defeated, captive or otherwise vulnerable minorities, Tasmanian natives appeared as a "capable and terrifying enemy" to colonists and were killed in the context of a war in which both sides killed noncombatants.

Lawson, in a critique of Reynolds' stand, argues that genocide was the inevitable outcome of a set of British policies to colonise Van Diemen's Land. He says the British government endorsed the use of partitioning and "absolute force" against Tasmanians, approved Robinson's "Friendly Mission" and colluded in transforming that mission into a campaign of ethnic cleansing from 1832. He says that once on Flinders Island, indigenous peoples were taught to farm land like Europeans and worship God like Europeans and concludes: "The campaign of transformation enacted on Flinders Island amounted to cultural genocide."

=== Queensland ===
Queensland represents the single bloodiest colonial frontier in Australia. The records of Queensland document the most frequent reports of shootings and massacres of indigenous people and the most disreputable frontier police force. Thus some sources have characterised these events as a "Queensland Aboriginal genocide". In 2009 professor Raymond Evans calculated the Indigenous fatalities caused by the Queensland Native Police Force alone as no less than 24,000.

== Scholarly and popular debate ==
=== Scholarly debate ===
There is an ongoing scholarly debate about whether there were acts of genocide in Australia and, if so, the form they took. Robert van Krieken argues that the debate often involves how broadly the concept of genocide ought to be understood. Narrow conceptions of genocide, such as that in the UN convention, are restricted to killing and other forms of physical elimination, whereas the broader definition includes other ways a human group can be destroyed, including the destruction of cultural identity.

Scholars are also divided over whether colonists and Australian governments acted with an intention to destroy Indigenous peoples in whole or in part and therefore committed genocide as defined by the UN convention. Reynolds argues that while some settlers and colonial officials talked of extermination of Aboriginal people in the context of the frontier wars, this was not official policy and killing of Aboriginal groups ended once their violent resistance to colonisation ended. Barta, however, argues that conflict between an expanding settlement and traditional owners of the land established "relations of genocide" and that a genocidal intent can be inferred from the actions of government agents which were contrary to declared policy.

Many scholars argue that the actions taken against Indigenous Australians were not systematic or intentional like other genocidal events. Others also argue that the high death toll among Indigenous Australians following colonisation was mainly a result of the introduction of diseases, and that deliberate acts of violence and the effects of dispossession did not meet the legal definition of genocide. Lawyer Michael Legge, however, concludes: "Australia's record on Indigenous Australians is at best ambiguous, and at worst an example of genocide by eugenics".

=== Popular debate ===
The publication of the Bringing Them Home report in 1997 and Keith Windschuttle's The Fabrication of Aboriginal History (2002) led to a heated public debate on genocide and frontier violence. Historians and commentators such as Windschuttle accused those who argued that Indigenous Australians had survived genocide of fabricating evidence and writing "black armband" history that claimed that "much of Australian history was a disgrace". Others argue that since the violence and dispossession happened in the past, it has no relevance to the current state of affairs. Proponents of the genocide thesis, in turn, often accused their critics of denialism and ignoring the evidence of frontier massacres, the violent dispossession of Indigenous Australians of their land, and the systematic removal of Aboriginal children from their families.

== Legacy and recognition ==
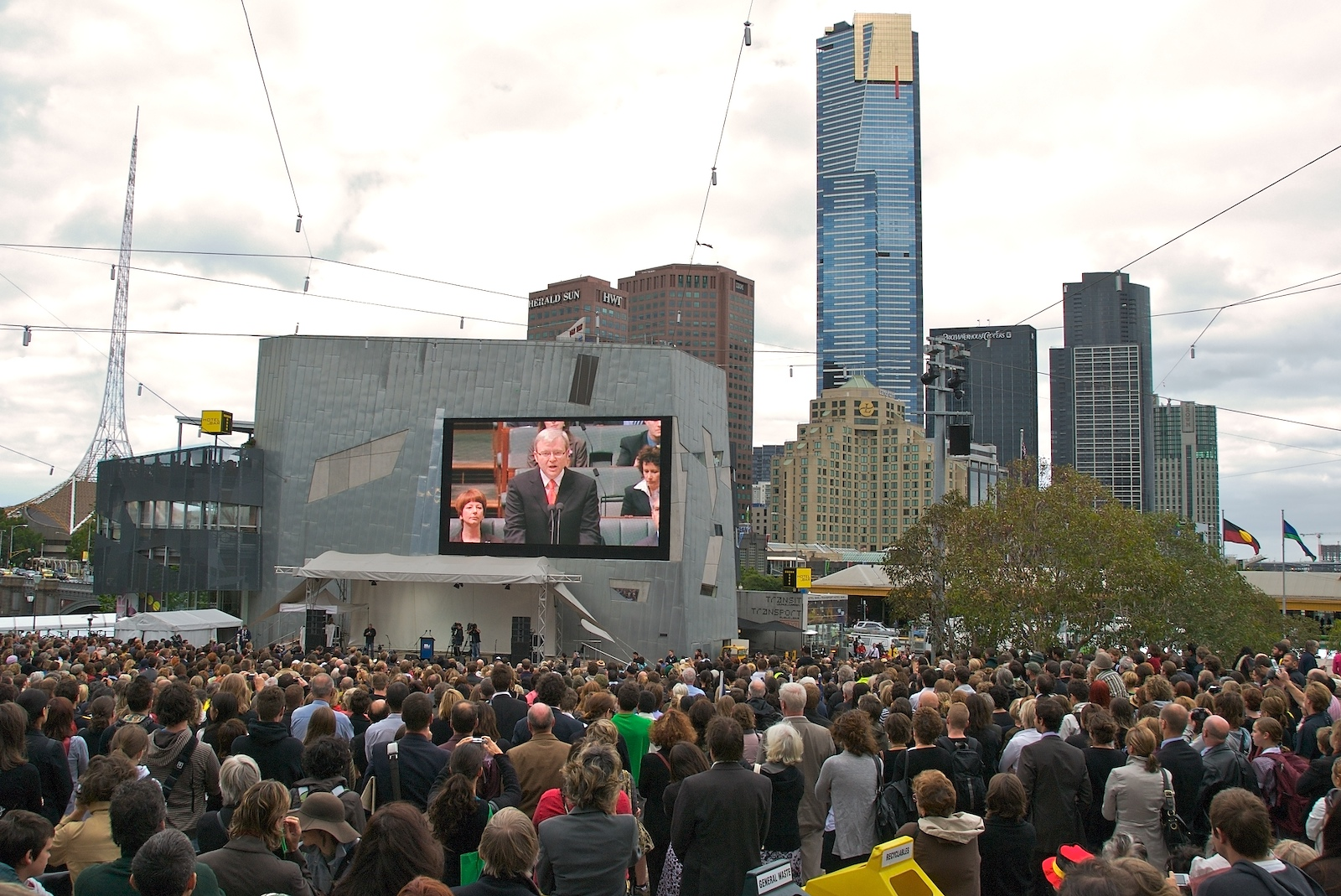
Prime Minister of Australia Kevin Rudd on screen in Federation Square, Melbourne, apologising to the stolen generations in 2008.

The recognition of historical injustices in Australia has been relatively slow. A watershed moment was the Bringing Them Home report, which contained the findings of the federal government inquiry into the removal of thousands of Aboriginal children. The report argued that the Commonwealth Government was guilty of the crime of genocide; under the United Nations Convention defining genocide as "intentional destruction of a racial, religious, national, or ethnic group".

Since 1998 Australia has acknowledged the harms caused to Indigenous Australians in a National Sorry Day on May 26. In 2008, Prime Minister Kevin Rudd, on behalf of the Australian Parliament, delivered an apology to the stolen generations and to all Indigenous Australians who had suffered because of the unjust government policies of the past. However, the apology did not specifically acknowledge genocide.

In 2025, the Yoorrook Justice Commission, set up by the Victoria State Government and the First Peoples' Assembly of Victoria concluded that from British colonisation in 1834, the indigenous peoples of Victoria had been subjected to genocide.

== See also ==
- Karuwali
- List of massacres of Indigenous Australians
- Mass poisonings of Aboriginal Australians
- Blackbirding
