= Forgotten War (book) =

2013 book by Henry Reynolds concerning the Australian frontier wars

- First edition
- Author: Professor Henry Reynolds
- Language: English
- Subject: Australian frontier wars
- Published: Sydney
- Publisher: NewSouth Publishing
- Publication date: 2013
- Pages: 280
- ISBN: 9781742233925
- Dewey Decimal: 994.0049915

Forgotten War is a 2013 book by Australian historian Henry Reynolds concerning the Australian frontier wars, a conflict between the British Empire and settlers on one side and Indigenous Australians on the other.

== Background and synopsis ==
Forgotten War is a follow-up from Reynolds' previous work, The Other Side of the Frontier which argued British colonisation of Australia had involved significant levels of violence and conflict, the history of which has been largely ignored. Forgotten War is designed as a "thorough and systematic account" of the frontier wars. The book argues there can be no true reconciliation between Indigenous Australians and non-indigenous Australians without acknowledging the history of violence and conflict.

== Reception ==
Historian Raymond Evans, writing for The Sydney Morning Herald described the book as a "closely argued account" which continues Reynolds' tradition of informing the "Australian public of things they need to know, but which many of them do not wish to hear." Evans concluded by praising Forgotten War as "an important and richly textured book - one that deserves wide reading and debate."

In the Sydney Review of Books Anna Clark wrote that "Reynolds is at his heartfelt and persuasive best here, as he explains the shared horrors of the frontier. He does so patiently and methodically, asking: Was it violent? (Yes.) Was it political and territorial? (Yes.) Was it war? (Yes.)"

=== Awards and recognition ===
Forgotten War received the Victorian Premier's Award for a Non-Fiction work at the 2014 Victorian Premier's Literary Awards with Reynolds receiving a $A25,000 prize. The judges praised Reynolds' work as "Elegantly written, authoritative and reflective" which "places our history in its contemporary context". The judges also noted that "Timely historical analysis of newly collated and discovered evidence shows that the coming of European settlers to Aboriginal territories was firmly defined as a frontier war by those involved at the time, government officials and settlers alike."

The book was also shortlisted for the 2015 Tasmanian Premier’s Literary Prize for best book with Tasmanian content in any genre and the Queensland Literary Awards History Book Award.
