= Wangga =

Aboriginal Australian genre of music and ceremony

- Stylistic origins: Traditional music
- Cultural origins: Aboriginal Australian
- Typical instruments: Indigenous Australian instruments

Wangga (sometimes spelled Wongga) is an Aboriginal Australian genre of traditional music and ceremony which originated in Northern Territory and north Western Australia, specifically from South Alligator River south east towards Ngukurr, south to the Katherine and west into the Kimberley. The Yolngu peoples of Arnhem Land created the genre.

In 1938, Australian anthropologist A. P. Elkin described Wangga thus: "[It] starts as a sudden high note, then descends in regular intervals to a low pitch, after which the songman just beats his sticks to the accompaniment of the didgeridoo. Twenty seconds or more later, the melody is sung as before and so on" and lyrics tend to be syllabic. Typically, the songs and dances express themes related to death and regeneration. The songs are performed publicly. The singers compose from their daily lives or while dreaming of a nyuidj (dead spirit).

== Recordings ==
- Stanner, W. E. H. (1950), Ceremonial singing and mythological discussions with Murinbata people (STANNER_W01), "Summary: Children singing; origin of Murinbata moieties; other myths; subsection system; ceremonial singing and discussion; Daly River wangga singing."
- Stanner, W. E. H. (William Edward Hanley) (1962), Songs, myths and discussions from the Port Keats area (STANNER_W02), "Summary: Murrinhpatha narratives of culture heroes and other important figures; songs accompanying the narratives; Wangga and Lirrga singing; Port Keats mission history; oral history;"
- Lucich, Peter (1963), Song cycles from Kalumburu, W.A. and Port Keats, N.T. (LUCICH_P03), "Balga, wangga and lirrga songs; song cycles belonging to individuals"
- Breen, Gavan (1969), Language elicitation from western Qld. (BREEN_G10 (BREEN_G10)), "Collection includes Guwamu or Murawari songs, Wangga-Yutjuru songs, Margany corroboree song"
- Steffensen, Margaret S; Sandefur, John R (1975), Language elicitation in Bamyili Creole with some songs and narratives, NT, "Basic word lists, verbs, sentences; comparison of light and heavy Kriol; Ngalkbon in comparison with Kriol; myths including emu; children's songs-traditional and non-indigenous; wangga and other traditional songs"
- Reilly, Lesley; Tchinburur, Justin; Tchinburur, Clement; Luckan, Pius (1981), Miscellaneous recordings at Wadeye (Port Keats), N.T. and Kalumburu Mission, W.A, "Summary: Circumcision ceremony; wangga (wonga) and thanpa (tchamba); Murrinpahpatha song genres Thanpa, Malkarrin and Wurlthirri; Marri Ngarr song genre Lirrga; church and liturgical music in traditional song style; language discussion and stories; Boniface's ordination; Easter and Xmas services; Bathurst and Port Keats choirs; modern and country music; local band concerts; wartime music from commercial recording."
- Mowaljarlai, David; Mowanjum Aboriginal Corporation (1982), Songs from Turkey Creek, WA (MOWALJARLAI_D02), "Summary: Wangga ceremony songs, sung by Turkey Creek singers at Mowanjum."
- Langton, Marcia (1983), Songs and explanations, "Summary: Walungari, Wurrngannjin and Wangga songs, recorded during filming."

== See also ==
- Music of Australia
- Indigenous Australian music
