= The Other Side of the Frontier =

1981 book about Aboriginal Australian resistance to British settlement starting 1788

- First edition
- Author: Henry Reynolds
- Language: English
- Subject: Australian history
- Genre: Non-fiction
- Publisher: James Cook University
- Publication date: 1981
- Publication place: Australia
- Media type: Print (Hardcover)
- Pages: 234 pp
- ISBN: 0-86840-892-1
- OCLC: 76032741
- Dewey Decimal: 994.0049915 22
- LC Class: DU124.F57 R49 2006

The Other Side of the Frontier is a history book published in 1981 by Australian historian Henry Reynolds. It is a study of Aboriginal Australian resistance to the British settlement, or invasion, of Australia from 1788 onwards.

The book constituted the first comprehensive research on this topic, and had a profound impact on Australian historiography. The University of New South Wales Press, which later published the book in 2012, said it "profoundly changed the way in which we understand the history of relations between Indigenous Australians and European settlers. It has since become a classic of Australian history." Robert Manne described it as "an important landmark", while Professor Cassandra Pybus of the University of Sydney wrote of the book that "no one could doubt the magnitude of Henry Reynolds' achievement in profoundly changing the way we understand our past".

== History and context ==
The Other Side of the Frontier is about the history of Indigenous Australian peoples, in particular Aboriginal Australians, after the commencement of a huge wave of immigration from 1788 onwards. Aboriginal people encountered cultures which were foreign to them. According to Reynolds, "over 750,000 Aboriginal people inhabited the island continent in 1788". The arrival of settlers, who brought diseases, destroyed the immediate population of many Sydney tribes. For thousands of years before the European invasion, the land was populated by a number of Aboriginal tribes, although there was a widespread belief that the land was terra nullius, meaning "no one's land". Aboriginal people lived along the Sydney harbour foreshores where they "fished and hunted the waters and hinterlands of the area, harvested good from the surrounding bush".[3] They were able to be independent and agreeable and did not need to travel away from their land, as their surroundings had everything they needed. They were able to trade between tribal groups and only moving across the land due to seasonal changes. Without any war between tribes, they were able to live happily, growing their customs, language and culture – "the heart of which was connection to the land".

After James Cook arrived in 1770, the Aboriginal peoples' ancient way of life came to an end, as his job was to voyage to the Southern Continent and take possession of it - whether it was inhabited or not. He declared the land of New South Wales to belong to King George III of Great Britain and Ireland, disregarding the fact that the land was already inhabited by the Indigenous peoples. The subsequent wave of immigrants failed to understand the Aboriginal way of life, which was to live peacefully with the land and environment, utilising specially honed skills and knowledge which enabled them to use the land to extremely well. These Indigenous peoples had a proven sustainability over a long period of time for themselves. This was not understood by the British people, and food shortages soon became a problem. The large immigrant population depleted the fish by netting huge catches, reduced the kangaroo population with unsustainable hunting, cleared the land, and polluted the water. As a result, the Aboriginal people throughout the Sydney Basin were soon close to starvation.

Ben Kiernan, a director of the genocide studies program at Yale University, wrote that nineteenth-century Australia colonists mounted numerous disciplinary expeditions against the Aboriginal people in which they committed "hundreds of massacres". Kiernan claimed that in central Queensland 40% of the Indigenous population were killed, and that the Aboriginal people "were hunted like wild beasts, having lives for years in a state of absolute terror of white predators".

== Overview ==
The most notable theme of the book is the analysis of Aboriginal resistance to the British at the time of the European settlement in Australia, which makes up about a third of The Other Side of the Frontier. Reynolds gives a summary of Indigenous communities' first reactions to European settlers arriving in Australia. He examines the gradual transition of Indigenous communities' perception of European settlers, and the formation of areas of physical conflict. He analyses the transition from the initial curiosity Indigenous people had towards European settlers to warlike resistance. According to historian Lyndall Ryan, the book is structured around three main themes: "a strong internationalism drawn from the United Nations Charter on Human Rights; that the ghost of racism underlies modern Australia; and Indigenous issues and justice should be at the center of public debate".

The book recounts summaries of conditions in different areas of Indigenous life affected by colonial settlement. The first chapters include the most important accounts of Indigenous people’s reactions to European pastoral, urban, agricultural, and missionary activities. These significant activities make up the structure of Reynolds arguments regarding Aboriginal resistance to European settlement in Australia.

In following a loose chronological order, Reynolds revisits these key interactions between Indigenous people and European settlers, through which he provides evidence of Aboriginal resistance. To document this, he draws upon archival information on the language developed by Indigenous people to address European settlers and their activities, highlighting the gradual transition from a use of Aboriginal words to newly invaded terms indicative of the fear and resistance.

The book also covers new Aboriginal tools, strategies and resources that were part of Aboriginal reaction to European settlement. Reynolds argues that there was not one homogeneous Aboriginal response to European settlement. The book covers Indigenous resistance in different parts of Australia and Tasmania highlighting the most significant differences and similarities amongst them.

== Editions ==
The Other Side of the Frontier was first published by James Cook University in 1981 This publication has been criticised for not having any illustrations and footnotes index, and there was criticism too for the failure of wide distribution of the book and making it readily available to the public, by failing to meet the shipment criteria of public retailers. In 1982, Penguin Books published the second edition of the book, with an edited introduction and different subheadings.

== Adaptations ==
Several documentaries and series have relied heavily on the book.

The ABC Television series Frontier, a three-part series on the development of European policy regarding Aboriginal people from mid 1780s to 1930s, draws heavily upon the historical facts Reynold’s present in his book.

The 2012 docudrama film Mabo and a BBC documentary on the history of race also drew historical evidence and narrative from this book.

The 2008 seven-part SBS Television historical series on Australian history through the eyes of First Nations people made by Rachel Perkins, First Australians, was also heavily based on the facts presented in Reynolds' book.

Perkins' 2022 SBS Television series, The Australian Wars, also draws on Reynolds' work in this area.

== Reception ==
The Other side of the Frontier has been broadcast to the general public of Australia, since its first publication in 1981. The book's accessible language and price makes it attainable to the general public. It has also circulated in academic circles in seminars and talks given by Reynolds at universities and his history lectures in Townsville University College until 1982.

The book was ground-breaking in that it was the first major work by an historian to write Australian history from an Aboriginal perspective. It has been recognised by leading Australian historians such as Lyndall Ryan, who said "In representing the Aborigines as displaced and dispossessed, he turned Australian history inside out rather than upside down".

In addition, Reynolds has played a central role in the "history wars", an ongoing debate amongst leading historians like Reynolds and Keith Windschuttle regarding the existence of a genocide during European settlement in Australia

The Other side of the Frontier is also included in the History Extension curriculum of Australian high schools.

In 1982, the book was awarded the Ernest Scott Historical Prize.

=== Favourable ===
Reynolds is praised for discussing Aboriginal resistance and “shuttering the myth that Aboriginal people didn't fight for their land”. According to Australian historian and scholar McQueen, Reynolds' account of Aboriginal resistance to European settlement is a key counterpoint to the legal justification of Indigenous stolen land and rights. Through the lens of European settlers, it is argued that the lack of Indigenous protection of their lands, furthers justifies European ownership.

The book has also been praised for Reynolds' historic methodology, with scholars like McQueen arguing that Reynolds achieved "the impossible" by documenting the response of pre-literate people. This was achieved mostly through a deep research of available historical archives as well as close contact with Indigenous communities and over ten years of research. Reynolds' supporters, who generally share left-liberal views, considered Reynolds a pioneer of Australian revisionist history for having attempted to relate history from an Indigenous perspective. Scholar Gray, states that this sets the Other Side of the Frontier apart from most historical books concerned with European settlement, which are in majority written from a colonial point of view.

Barrier Dyster praises the book, stating that "No Australian course, no Australian student, no Australian home should be without a copy".

Reviewing it for the Aboriginal Law Bulletin, John Terry wrote:

Reynolds' book presents important concepts in Australian history. It is an appreciation that the convicts, squatters, explorers, diggers, ticket-of-leave men and the like did not step onto a continent that was barren and uninhabited, but into a rich and complex world of another people who resisted the invasion, fought for their land, struggled to survive - and who continue to struggle for due recognition. These ideas have been familiar for some time of course, and attempts have been made to document them, but this is the first serious production by a competent historian.

=== Negative ===
The Other Side of the Frontier has also received strong criticism about the historical alternative it offers. In particular Keith Windschuttle, the other main historian at the centre of the History Wars, disagrees that there ever was an Aboriginal frontier war, arguing that Reynolds had fabricated the evidences that he uses in his book. Other historical and political figures, like R. Firth and J. Howard, share a similar view. This criticism is based mostly on different historical methodologies that are used to collect data supporting or disproving of the existence of the Australian frontier wars, mostly in regard to which sources are deemed reliable in their records of Indigenous people death toll.

Windschuttle has extensively spoken and written in response to The Other side of the Frontier, rejecting Reynolds' arguments and questioning his methodology. He has argued that Reynolds has misinterpreted or misunderstood the original sources in his book, resulting in inaccurate claims. Windschuttle notes that the original sources Reynolds has used (which he does not reveal), have admitted guessing the death toll of Indigenous people with no clear knowledge of the actual numbers.

In addition, Windschuttle also argues that Reynolds exaggerates the death toll of Indigenous people in his book, in order to support his claims about European settlement in Australia. Reynolds, as Windschuttle argues, achieves this by deliberately taking out of context historical sources, like British settlers' ones, to support his claims on Australian history. With regard to Reynolds' methodology of recording Indigenous people's death toll during European settlement, Windschuttle notes:

The Other Side of the Frontier has also been criticised for the socio-political aftermath of the book. Nick Minchin, former Australian federal senator, argued that the book makes reconciliation in Australia "even harder to achieve", by discussing the genocide and hardship Indigenous communities' experiences during European settlement, which stands responsible for Indigenous peoples' generational trauma today.

This fits into a wider narrative of criticism against Reynolds and his work, targeting his particularly dark and bloody presentation of Australian history. It is for these reasons that the book has been characterised as unpatriotic by Windschuttle and other conservatives.
