= Henry Reynolds (historian) =

Australian historian

Henry Reynolds FAHA, FASSA
- Born: 1938 (age 87–88); Hobart, Tasmania, Australia
- Awards: Queensland Premier's Literary Award for Best Literary Work Advancing Public Debate (2000); Queensland Premier's History Book Award (2008); Prime Minister's Literary Award for Non-Fiction (2009); Victorian Premier's Prize for Nonfiction (2014)

Academic background
- Education: University of Tasmania (BA [Hons], MA)

Academic work
- Institutions: University of Tasmania (2000–); James Cook University (1965–98)
- Main interests: Australian colonial history Aboriginal–white relations in Australia
- Notable works: The Other Side of the Frontier (1981)

Henry Reynolds FAHA FASSA (born 1938) is an Australian historian whose primary work has focused on the frontier conflict between European settlers in Australia and Indigenous Australians. He was the first academic historian to advocate for Indigenous land rights, becoming known with his first major work, The Other Side of the Frontier (1981).

== Early life and education ==
Henry Reynolds was born in Hobart, Tasmania, in 1938, the son of John Reynolds, who was a journalist who wrote the first biography of Edmund Barton.

He attended Hobart High School.

Following this, he attended the University of Tasmania, where he graduated as a Bachelor of Arts with Honours in History in 1960, later gaining a Master of Arts degree in 1964.

== Career ==
Reynolds taught in secondary schools in Australia and England.

He joined the academic staff at Townsville University College (later James Cook University) in 1966 to teach. In the 1970s, he undertook an oral history project. He served as associate professor of history and politics from 1982 until his retirement in 1998.

In 2000 Reynolds became professorial fellow at the University of Tasmania in Launceston.

As of September 2022, Reynolds was Emeritus Professor of History at the University of Tasmania.

== Research and publications ==
The Other Side of the Frontier, published in 1981, was the first major work by an historian to write Australian history from an Aboriginal perspective.

In many books and academic articles Reynolds has sought to explain his view of the high level of violence and conflict involved in the colonisation of Australia, and the Aboriginal resistance to numerous massacres of Indigenous people. Reynolds estimated that up to 3,000 Europeans and at least 20,000 Aboriginal Australians were killed directly in the frontier violence, and many more Aboriginal people died indirectly through the introduction of European diseases and starvation caused by being forced from their productive tribal lands. Keith Windschuttle has categorised his approach as a "black armband view" of Australian history. In 2002, Windschuttle, in his book The Fabrication of Aboriginal History, Volume One: Van Diemen's Land 1803–1847, accused Reynolds of misrepresenting, inventing, or exaggerating evidence about the killings. Windschuttle's version of Australian history has been criticised as flawed by other historians.

In November 2025, Reynolds published Looking from the North: Australian history from the top down, which charts the history colonisation of Australia north of the Tropic of Capricorn, which was very different from the south.

== Friendship with Eddie Mabo ==
Reynolds struck up a friendship with Eddie Mabo, who was employed as a groundsman and gardener at James Cook University from 1967 to 1975. Reynolds, as well as his wife Margaret, were supporters of the Black Community School in South Townsville, which Mabo was instrumental in establishing, and which operated from 1973 to 1985. The Reynolds', as respected members of the Townsville academic community, publicly defended the school when it came under attack from the local Townsville Daily Bulletin newspaper as well as some local politicians in September 1973.

In his book Why Weren't We Told?, Reynolds describes the talks they had regarding Mabo's people's rights to their lands, on Murray Island, in the Torres Strait. Reynolds writes:

Eddie [...] would often talk about his village and about his own land, which he assured us would always be there when he returned because everyone knew it belonged to his family. His face shone when he talked of his village and his land.

So intense and so obvious was his attachment to his land that I began to worry about whether he had any idea at all about his legal circumstances. [...] I said something like: "You know how you've been telling us about your land and how everyone knows it's Mabo land? Don't you realise that nobody actually owns land on Murray Island? It's all crown land."

He was stunned. [...] How could the whitefellas question something so obvious as his ownership of his land?

Reynolds looked into the issue of Indigenous land ownership in international law, and encouraged Mabo to take the matter to court. "It was there over the sandwiches and tea that the first step was taken which led to the Mabo judgement in June 1992". Mabo then talked to lawyers, and Reynolds "had little to do with the case itself from that time", although he and Mabo remained friends until the latter's death in January 1992. Reynolds' 1970s oral history project however contributed to the High Court's recognition of land rights.

== Other activities ==
In September 2022, Reynolds appeared with filmmaker Rachel Perkins at a National Press Club of Australia address, soon after the airing of Perkins' SBS Television series, The Australian Wars.

== Awards and honours ==
Henry Reynolds has received the following awards and honours:

- 1970–71 British Council Travelling Scholarship
- 1982 Ernest Scott Historical Prize for The Other Side of the Frontier
- 1986 Harold White Fellowship, National Library of Australia
- 1988 Human Rights and Equal Opportunity Commission Arts Award for The Law of the Land
- 1996 Australian Book Council Award: the Banjo Award for non-fiction
- 1998 Doctor of Letters (honoris causa), University of Tasmania
- 1999 Fellow of the Academy of the Social Sciences in Australia (FASSA)
- 1999 Fellow of the Australian Academy of the Humanities (FAHA)
- 1999 Human Rights Commission Arts Non-Fiction Award
- 2000 Queensland Premier's Literary Awards Literary Work Advancing Public Debate – the Harry Williams Award for Why Weren't We Told?
- 2000 Australian Humanist of the Year Award
- 2008: With Professor Marilyn Lake, Queensland Premier's Literary Awards History Book Award for Drawing the Global Colour Line
- 2009: With Marilyn Lake, the non-fiction category of the Prime Minister's Literary Awards for Drawing the Global Colour Line
- 2012: Honorary Doctor of Letters from James Cook University

=== Conference ===
In tribute to Reynolds' seventieth year, the conference Race, Nation, History: A Conference in Honour of Henry Reynolds was held in August 2008. It was sponsored by the Australian National University's Research School of the Humanities and the Research School of the Social Sciences, the National Library of Australia, and the University of Tasmania. Larissa Behrendt of University of Technology Sydney was among the speakers. (Note: Selected papers from the conference were published in a volume by Australian Scholarly Publishing, but do not appear to be otherwise available.)

== Personal life ==
In December 1963 Henry Reynolds married Margaret Reynolds (née Lyne), who served as an ALP senator for Queensland in Federal Parliament from 1983 until 1999. Their daughter is Anna Reynolds, the Lord Mayor of Hobart.

== Major works ==
- Aborigines and Settlers: the Australian Experience, 1788–1939 (ed) (1972) ISBN 030493917X
- The Other Side of the Frontier : Aboriginal Resistance to the European Invasion of Australia (1981) ISBN 0-14-022475-0
- Frontier; Aborigines, Settlers and Land (1987) ISBN 0-04-994005-8
- Dispossession; Black Australia and White Invaders (1989) ISBN 1-86448-141-2
- With the White People (1990) ISBN 0-14-012834-4
- Race Relations in North Queensland (1993) (ed) ISBN 0-86443-484-7
- Aboriginal Sovereignty: Reflections on Race, State and Nation (1996) ISBN 1-86373-969-6
- This Whispering in Our Hearts (1998) ISBN 1-86448-581-7
- Why Weren't We Told? (2000) ISBN 0-14-027842-7
- Black Pioneers (2000) ISBN 0-14-029820-7
- An Indelible Stain? The Question of Genocide in Australia's History (2001) ISBN 0-670-91220-4
- The Law Of The Land (2003) ISBN 0-14-100642-0
- Fate of a Free People (2004) ISBN 0-14-300237-6
- Drawing the Global Colour Line: White Men's Countries and the International Challenge of Racial Equality (2008) ISBN 978-0-521-88118-0
- Marilyn Lake and Henry Reynolds (eds.), What's Wrong with ANZAC? The Militarisation of Australian History, Sydney, NewSouth Books, 2010. ISBN 978-1-74223-151-8
- A History of Tasmania (2011) ISBN 9780521548373
- Forgotten War (2013, NewSouth Books) ISBN 978-1-74223-392-5
- Unnecessary Wars (2016, NewSouth Books) ISBN 9781742234809
- Truth Telling: History, sovereignty and the Uluru Statement (2021, NewSouth Books) ISBN 9781742236940
- Tongerlongeter: First Nations Leader & Tasmanian War Hero. With Nicholas Clements (2021, NewSouth Books) ISBN 9781742236384
- Looking from the North: Australian history from the top down. NewSouth. 1 November 2025. ISBN 978-1-76117-909-9.

== Sources ==
- Loos, Noel; Mabo, Edward Koiki (1996). Edward Koiki Mabo. His Life and Struggle for Land Rights. Brisbane: University of Queensland Press. ISBN 978-0-7022-4979-2.
- Reynolds, Henry (1999). Why Weren't We Told? A Personal Search for the Truth About Our History. New York City: Penguin Random House. ISBN 978-0-14-027842-2.
