= Culture of Australia =

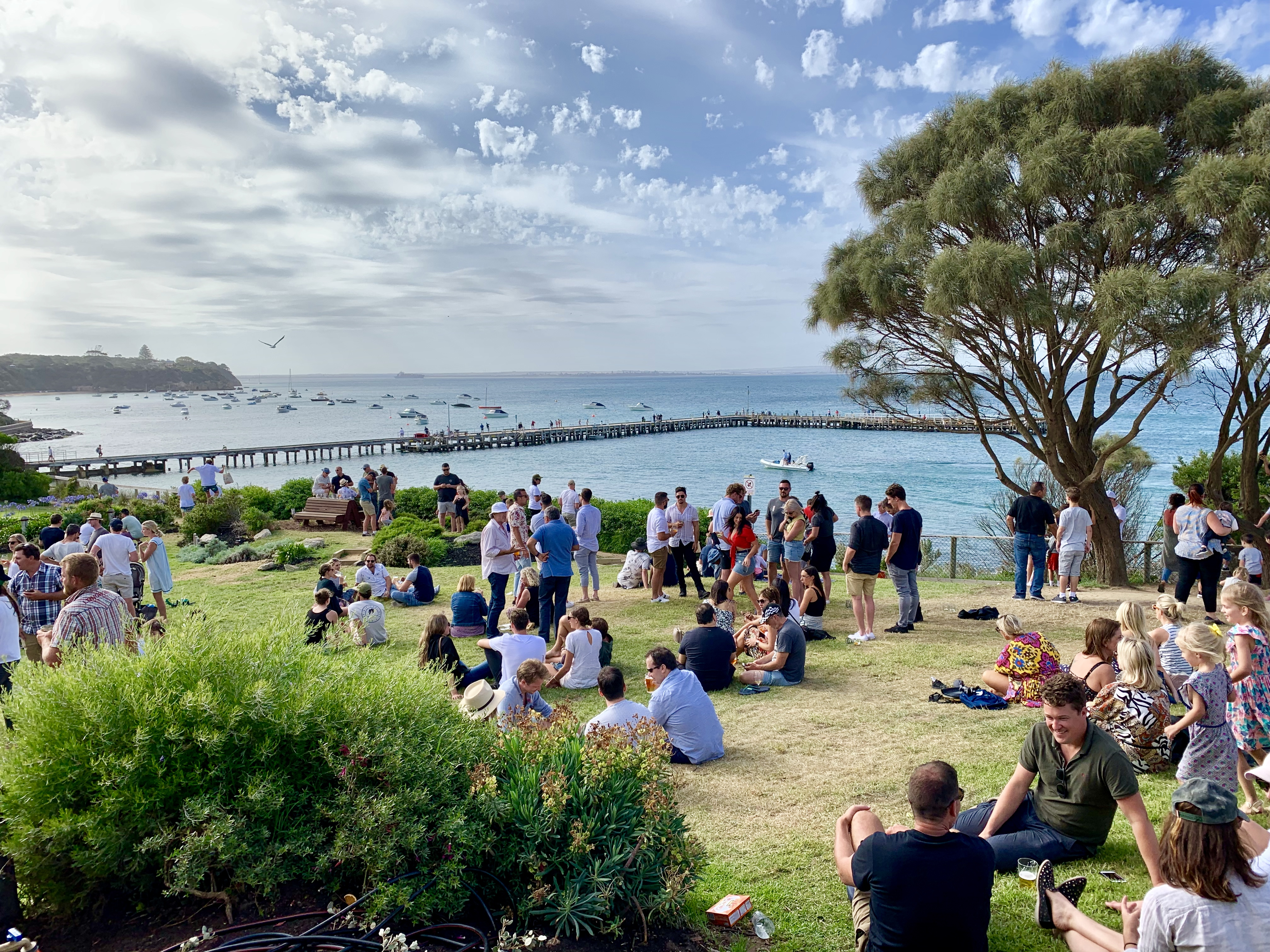
Australians by the waterside at the Portsea Hotel, a pub in Melbourne, Victoria

Australian culture is of primarily Western origins, and is derived from its British, Indigenous and migrant components.

Aboriginal Australians arrived as early as 60,000 years ago, and evidence of Aboriginal art in Australia dates back at least 30,000 years. Spiritual beliefs endure among Aboriginal peoples. Torres Strait Islanders, another indigenous group, have their own cultural traditions.

The British colonisation of Australia began in 1787 and waves of multi-ethnic, primarily Anglo-Celtic, migration followed shortly thereafter. Several states and territories had their origins as penal colonies, with this convict heritage having an enduring effect on Australian music, cinema and literature. Manifestations of British colonial heritage in Australia include the primacy of the English language and Western Christianity, the institution of constitutional monarchy, a Westminster-style system of democratic parliamentary government, and Australia's inclusion within the Commonwealth of Nations. The American political ideals of constitutionalism and federalism have also played a role in shaping Australia's distinctive political identity.

The Australian gold rushes from the 1850s resulted in exponential population and economic growth, as well as racial tensions and the introduction of novel political ideas; the growing disparity between the prospectors and the established colonial governments culminated in the Eureka Stockade rebellion and the shifting political climate ushered in significant electoral reform, the labour movement, and improved women's rights ahead of any such changes in other Western countries.

Federation occurred in 1901 as the result of a burgeoning sense of national unity and identity that had developed over the latter half of the 19th century, hitherto demonstrated in the works of Heidelberg School artists and authors like Banjo Paterson, Henry Lawson, and Dorothea Mackellar. The First World War and Second World War profoundly impacted Australia, ushering in the heroic ANZAC legend of the former and the geopolitical reorientation in which the United States became Australia's foremost military ally after the latter. In the seven decades following the Second World War, more than 6.5 million migrants settled in Australia from 200 nations, further enriching Australian culture in the process. Over time, as immigrant populations gradually assimilated into Australian life, their cultural and culinary practices became part of mainstream Australian culture.

== Historical development of Australian culture ==
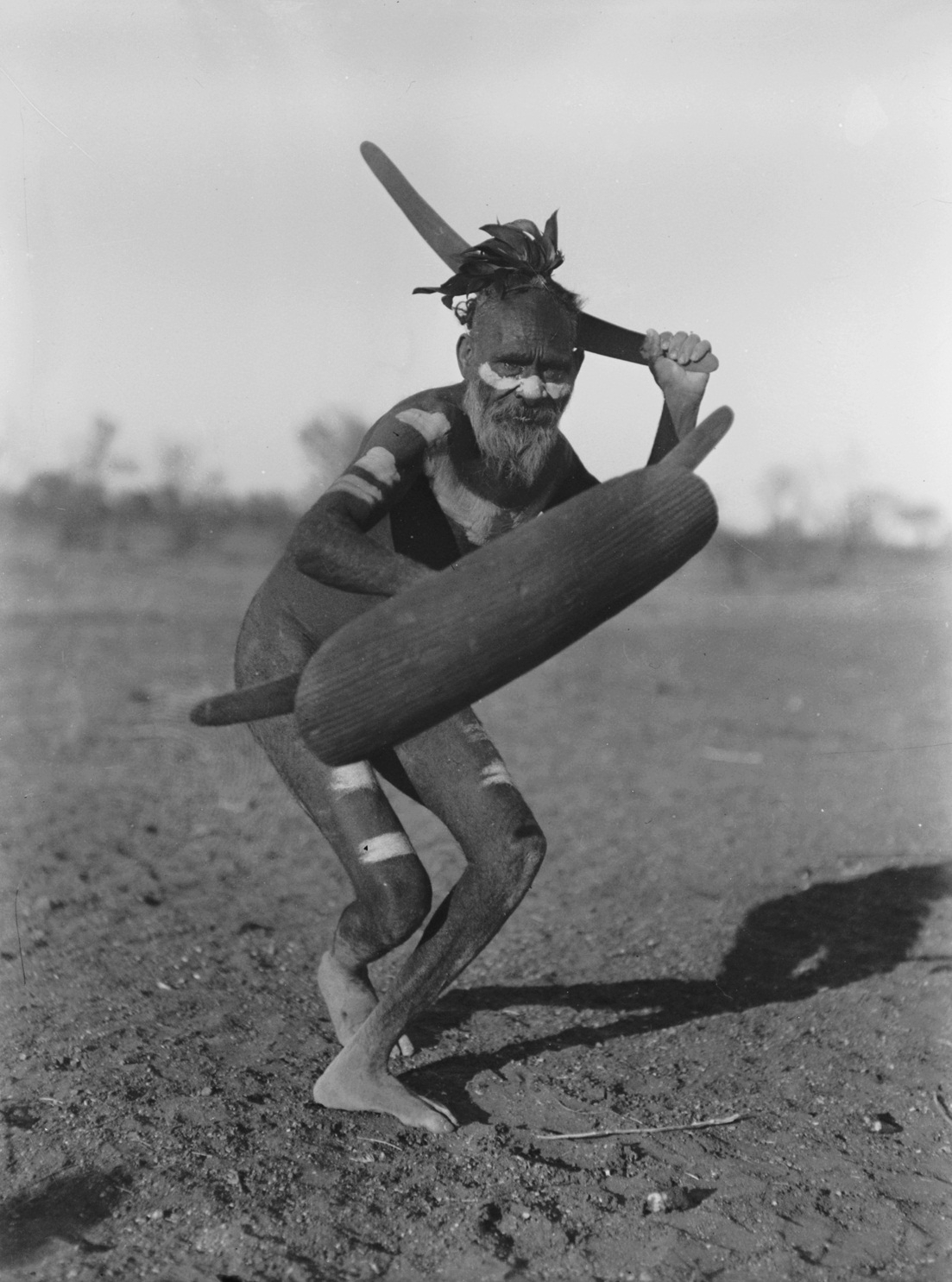
A Luritja man demonstrating method of attack with boomerang under cover of shield (1920)

The oldest surviving cultural traditions of Australia—and some of the oldest surviving cultural traditions on earth—are those of Australia's Aboriginal and Torres Strait Islander peoples, collectively referred to as Indigenous Australians. Their ancestors have inhabited Australia for between 40,000 and 60,000 years, living a hunter-gatherer lifestyle. In 2006, the Indigenous population was estimated at 517,000 people, or 2.5 per cent of the total population. Most Aboriginal Australians have a belief system based on the Dreaming, or Dreamtime, which refers both to a time when ancestral spirits created land and culture, and to the knowledge and practices that define individual and community responsibilities and identity.

The arrival of the first British settlers at what is now Sydney in 1788 introduced Western civilisation to the Australian continent. Although Sydney was initially used by the British as a place of banishment for prisoners, the arrival of the British laid the foundations for Australia's democratic institutions and rule of law, and introduced the long traditions of English literature, Western art and music, and Judeo-Christian ethics and religious outlook which shaped the Australian national culture and identity.

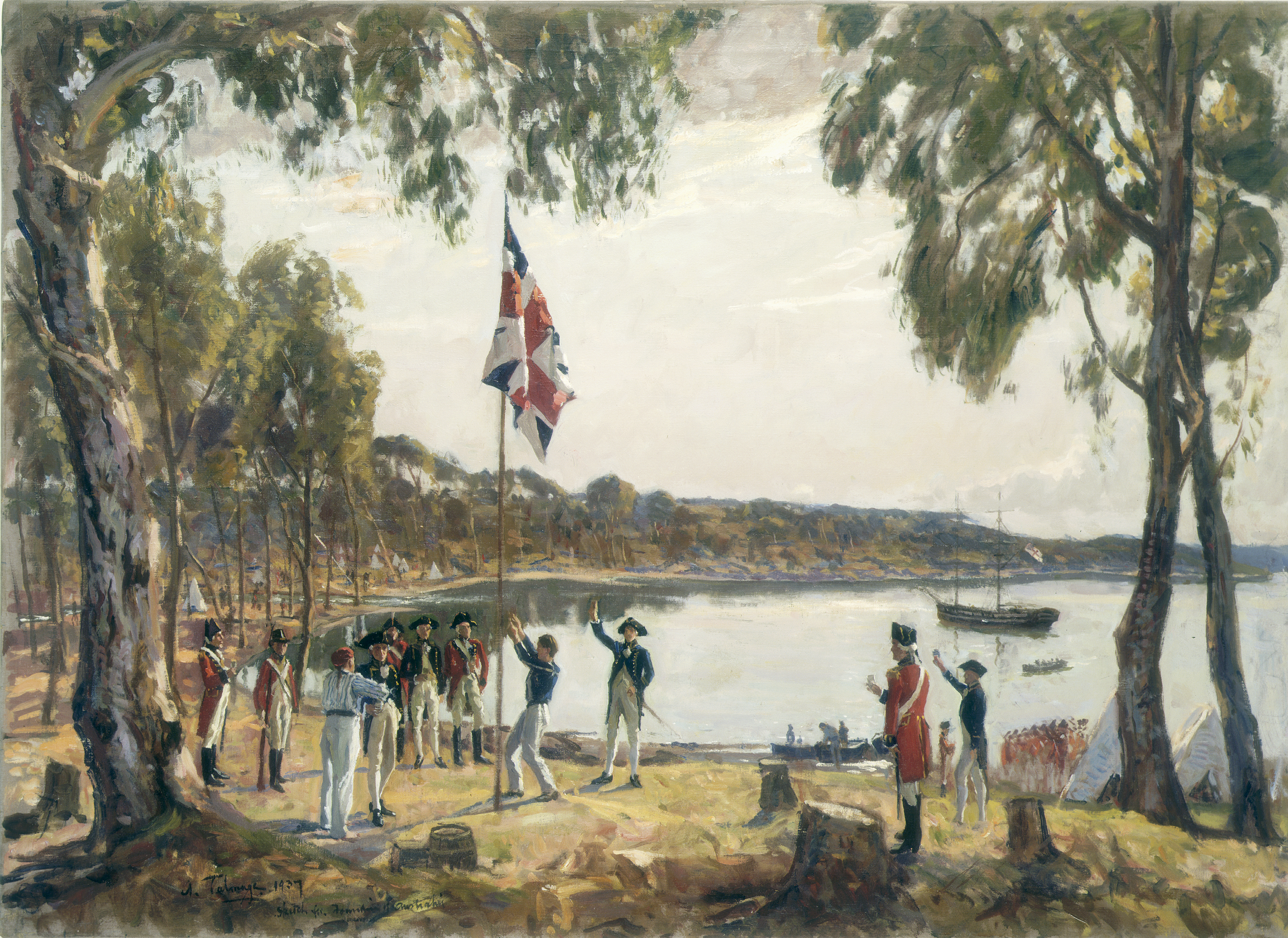
Governor Arthur Phillip hoists the British flag over the new colony at Sydney Cove in 1788

The British Empire expanded across the whole continent and established six colonies. The colonies were originally penal colonies, with the exception of Western Australia and South Australia, which were each established as a "free colony" with no convicts and a vision for a territory with political and religious freedoms, together with opportunities for wealth through business and pastoral investments. However, Western Australia became a penal colony after insufficient numbers of free settlers arrived. Adelaide, the capital of South Australia, grew from its status as a convict free region and experienced prosperity from the late nineteenth century.

Contact between the Indigenous Australians and the new settlers ranged from cordiality to violent conflict, but the diseases brought by Europeans were devastating to Aboriginal populations and culture. According to the historian Geoffrey Blainey, during the colonial period: "Smallpox, measles, influenza and other new diseases swept from one Aboriginal camp to another ... The main conqueror of Aborigines was to be disease and its ally, demoralization."

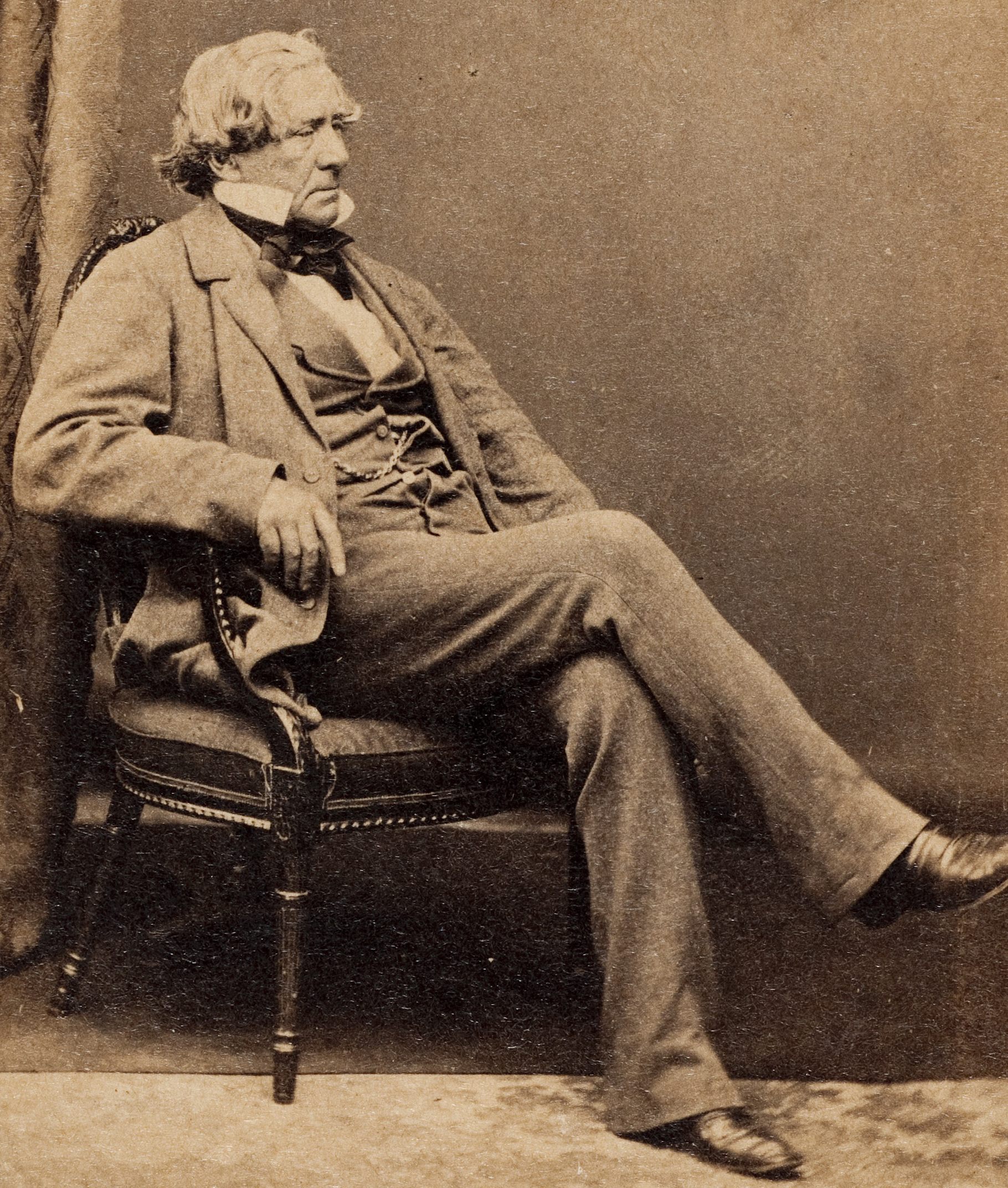
William Wentworth (1790–1872) was among the first to articulate a vision of Australian nationhood

Calls for responsible government emerged, and the first political party was set up in 1835 to advance the cause. William Charles Wentworth, one its co-founders and an early proponent of Australian national identity, later spearheaded the creation of the first Australian parliament, established in New South Wales. From the 1850s, the colonies wrote constitutions which produced democratically advanced parliaments under the system of constitutional monarchy, with Queen Victoria as the head of state.

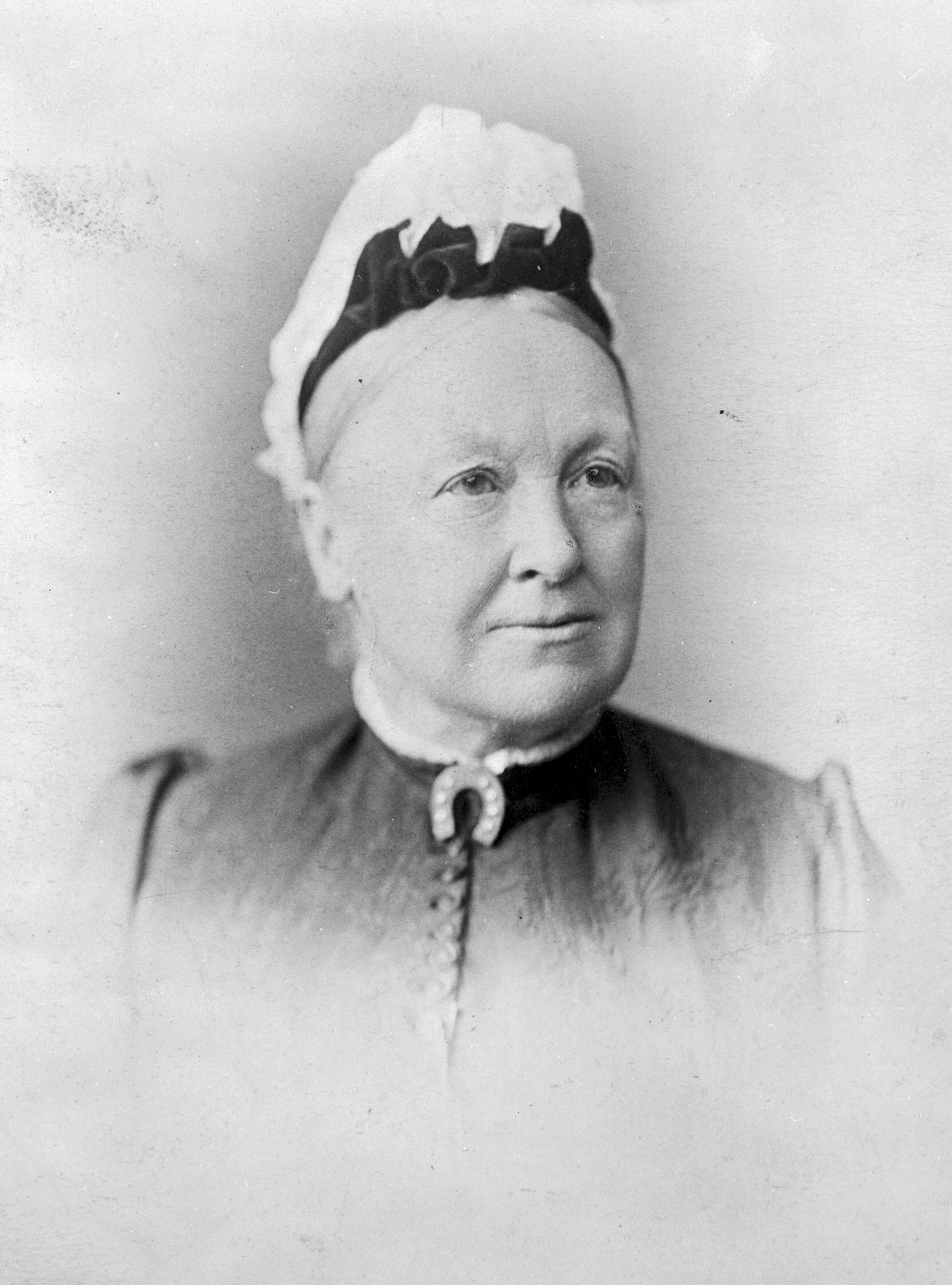
South Australian suffragette Catherine Helen Spence (1825–1910). The Australian colonies established democratic parliaments from the 1850s and began to grant women the vote in the 1890s.

Women's suffrage in Australia was achieved from the 1890s. Women became eligible to vote in South Australia in 1895. This was the first legislation in the world permitting women to stand for political office and, in 1897, Catherine Helen Spence, an Adelaidean, became the first female political candidate. Though constantly evolving, the key foundations for elected parliamentary government have maintained an historical continuity in Australia from the 1850s into the 21st century.

During the colonial era, distinctive forms of Australian art, music, language and literature developed through movements like the Heidelberg school of painters and the work of bush balladeers like Henry Lawson and Banjo Paterson, whose poetry and prose did much to promote an egalitarian Australian outlook which placed a high value on the concept of "mateship". Games like cricket and rugby were imported from Britain at this time and with a local variant of football, Australian Rules Football, became treasured cultural traditions.

The Commonwealth of Australia was founded in 1901, after a series of referendums conducted in the British colonies of Australasia. The Australian Constitution established a federal democracy and enshrined human rights such as sections 41 (right to vote), 80 (right to trial by jury) and 116 (freedom of religion) as foundational principles of Australian law and included economic rights such as restricting the government to acquiring property only "on just terms". The Australian Labor Party was established in the 1890s and the Liberal Party of Australia in 1944, both rising to be the dominant political parties and rivals of Australian politics, though various other parties have been and remain influential. Voting is compulsory in Australia and government is essentially formed by a group commanding a majority of seats in the Australian House of Representatives selecting a leader who becomes Prime Minister. Australia remains a constitutional monarchy in which the largely ceremonial and procedural duties of the monarch are performed by a Governor General selected by the Australian government.

Australia fought at Britain's side from the outset of World War I and World War II and came under attack from the Empire of Japan during the latter conflict. These wars profoundly affected Australia's sense of nationhood and a military legend developed around the spirit of Australia's ANZAC troops, who came to symbolise the virtues of endurance, courage, ingenuity, good humour, and mateship.

The Australian colonies had a period of extensive non-British European and Chinese immigration during the Australian gold rushes of the latter half of the 19th century, but following Federation in 1901, the Parliament instigated the White Australia Policy, which gave preference to British migrants. The post-World War II immigration program saw the policy relaxed then dismantled by successive governments, permitting large numbers of non-British Europeans, and later Asian and Middle Eastern migrants to arrive. The Menzies Government (1949–1966) and Holt government maintained the White Australia Policy but relaxed it, and then the legal barriers to multiracial immigration were dismantled during the 1970s, with the promotion of multiculturalism by the Whitlam and Fraser governments.

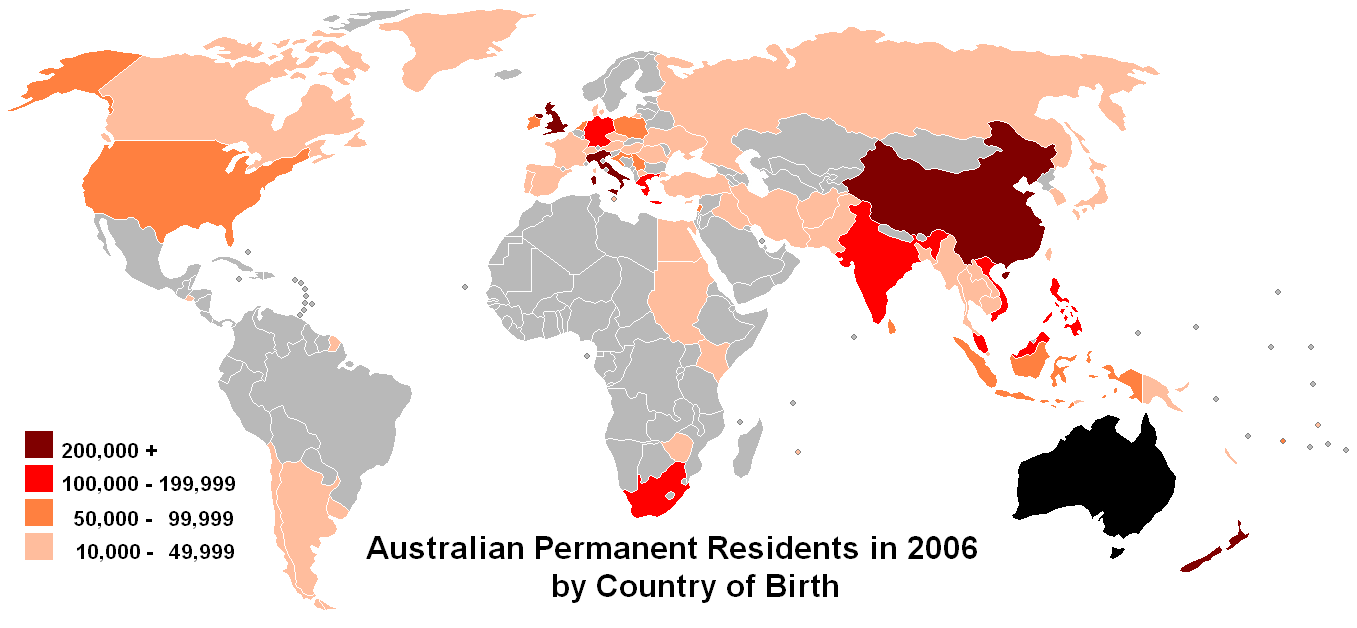
Countries of birth of Australian estimated resident population, 2006

From the protest movements from the 1930s, with the gradual lifting of restrictions, Indigenous Australians began to develop a unity sense of Aboriginality, maintained by all Aboriginal artists, musicians, sportsmen and writers. However, some States and Territories of Australia retained discriminatory laws relating to voting rights for Aboriginal and Torres Strait Islander people into the 1960s, at which point full legal equality was established. A 1967 referendum to include all Aboriginal and Torres Strait Islander people in official population counts was overwhelmingly approved by voters, singling the beginning of action and organisation at a national level in Aboriginal affairs. Since then, conflict and reconciliation between Indigenous and non-Indigenous Australians has been a source of much art and literature in Australia. In 1986, the Richters family were located in the Great Victoria Desert, believed to have been the last Aboriginals to live traditionally as hunter-gatherers.

While the British cultural influence remained strong into the 21st century, other influences became increasingly important. Australia's post-war period was marked by an influx of Europeans who broadened the nation's vision. The Hawaiian sport of surfing was adopted in Australia where a beach culture and the locally developed surf lifesaving movement was already burgeoning in the early 20th century. American pop culture and cinema were embraced in the 20th century, with country music and later rock and roll sweeping Australia, aided by the new technology of television and a host of American content. The 1956 Melbourne Olympics, the first to be broadcast to the world, announced a confident, prosperous post-war nation, and new cultural icons like Australian country music star Slim Dusty and dadaist Barry Humphries expressed a uniquely Australian identity.

Australia's contemporary immigration program has two components: a program for skilled and family migrants and a humanitarian program for refugees and asylum seekers. By 2010, the post-war immigration program had received more than 6.5 million migrants from every continent. The population tripled in the six decades to around 21 million in 2010, including people originating from 200 countries. More than 43 per cent of Australians were either born overseas or have one parent who was born overseas. The population is highly urbanised, with more than 75% of Australians living in urban centres, largely along the coast.

Contemporary Australia is a pluralistic society, rooted in liberal democratic traditions and espousing informality and egalitarianism as key societal values. Strongly influenced by Anglo-Celtic origins, the culture of Australia has also been shaped by multi-ethnic migration which has influenced all aspects of Australian life, including business, the arts, cuisine, sense of humour and sporting tastes.

Contemporary Australia is also a culture that is profoundly influenced by global movements of meaning and communication, including advertising culture. In turn, globalising corporations from Holden to Exxon have attempted to associate their brand with Australian cultural identity. This process intensified from the 1970s onwards. According to Paul James,

this consciously created interlock of the image of the multinational corporation with aspects of Australia's national mythology, has itself over the last decade [the 1970s to 1980s] contributed to the maintenance and evolution of those national themes. But paradoxically, during the same period it has reinforced Australia's international orientation.

== Symbols ==
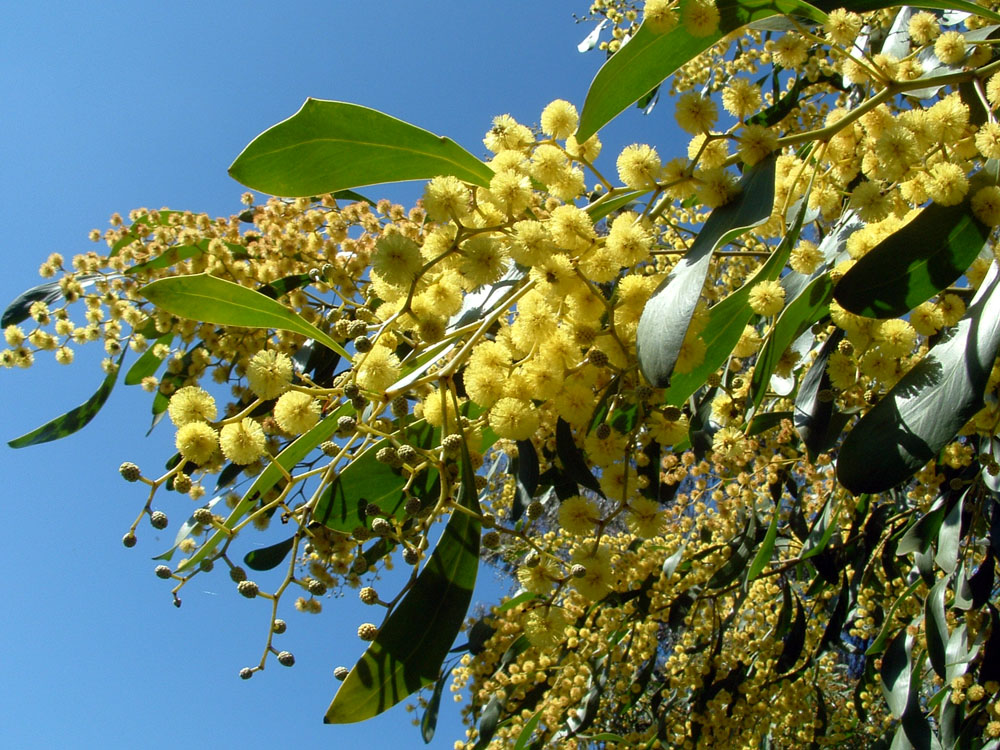
Golden wattle, Australia's floral emblem and the source of Australia's national colours, green and gold

When the Australian colonies federated on 1 January 1901, an official competition for a design for an Australian flag was held. The design that was adopted contains the Union Jack in the left corner, symbolising Australia's historical links to the United Kingdom, the stars of the Southern Cross on the right half of the flag indicating Australia's geographical location, and the seven-pointed Federation Star in the bottom left representing the six states and the territories of Australia. Other official flags include the Australian Aboriginal flag, the Torres Strait Islander flag and the flags of the individual states and territories.

The Australian Coat of Arms was granted by King George V in 1912 and consists of a shield containing the badges of the six states, within an ermine border. The crest above the shield and helmet is a seven-pointed gold star on a blue and gold wreath, representing the 6 states and the territories. The shield is supported by a red kangaroo and an emu, which were chosen to symbolise a nation moving forward.

Green and gold were confirmed as Australia's national colours in 1984, though the colours had been adopted on the uniforms of Australia's sporting teams long before this. The golden wattle (Acacia pycnantha) was officially proclaimed as the national floral emblem in 1988.

Reflecting the country's status as a constitutional monarchy, the Crown remains part of Australian public life, maintaining a visual presence through federal and state coats of arms, charitable and cultural patronage, the names and symbols of public institutions and the governor-general and state governors, who are the monarch's representatives on Australian soil. Some Australian banknotes and all coins bear an image of the monarch. (Note: Historically, since the introduction of decimal currency, the lowest denomination note ($1 from 1966, until the note's replacement by a coin in 1984; $5 since 1992) has depicted Queen Elizabeth II, as have all coins until her death in 2022. King Charles III's image appeared on new $1 coins in 2023, and all new coins by 2024. In 2023 the Reserve Bank announced that the design of the $5 note would be updated, replacing Elizabeth with imagery that "honours the culture and history of the First Australians", instead of Charles.) At least 14,9% of lands in Australia are referred to as Crown land, considered public land. There are many geographic places that have been named in honour of a reigning monarch, including the states of Queensland and Victoria, named after Queen Victoria, with numerous rivers, streets, squares, parks and buildings carrying the names of past or present members of the royal family.

== Language ==
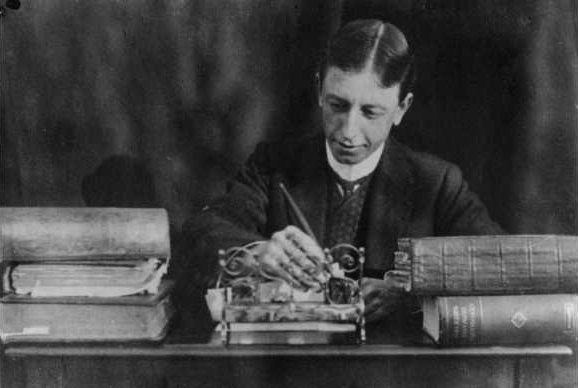
C. J. Dennis, poetic humourist of Australian English

Although Australia has no official language, it is largely monolingual with English being the de facto national language. Australian English is a major variety of the language that is immediately distinguishable from British, American, and other national dialects by virtue of its unique accents, pronunciations, idioms and vocabulary, although its spelling more closely reflects British versions rather than American. According to the 2011 census, English is the only language spoken in the home for around 80% of the population. The next most common languages spoken at home are Mandarin (1.7%), Italian (1.5%), and Arabic (1.4%); almost all migrants speak some English. Australia has multiple sign languages, the most spoken known as Auslan, which in 2004 was the main language of about 6,500 deaf people, and Australian Irish Sign Language with about 100 speakers.

An aspect of the mateship culture on language is that Australians have a propensity for the diminutive forms of names e.g. Hargrave → Hargie; Wilkinson → Wilko; John → Johnno; David → Davo; Hogan → Hoges; James → Jimmy → Jim → Jimbo. This is a display of affection and acceptance rather than belittlement.

It is believed that there were between 200 and 300 Australian Aboriginal languages at the time of first European contact, but only about 70 of these have survived and all but 20 are now endangered. An Indigenous language is the main language for 0.25% of the population.

== Humour ==
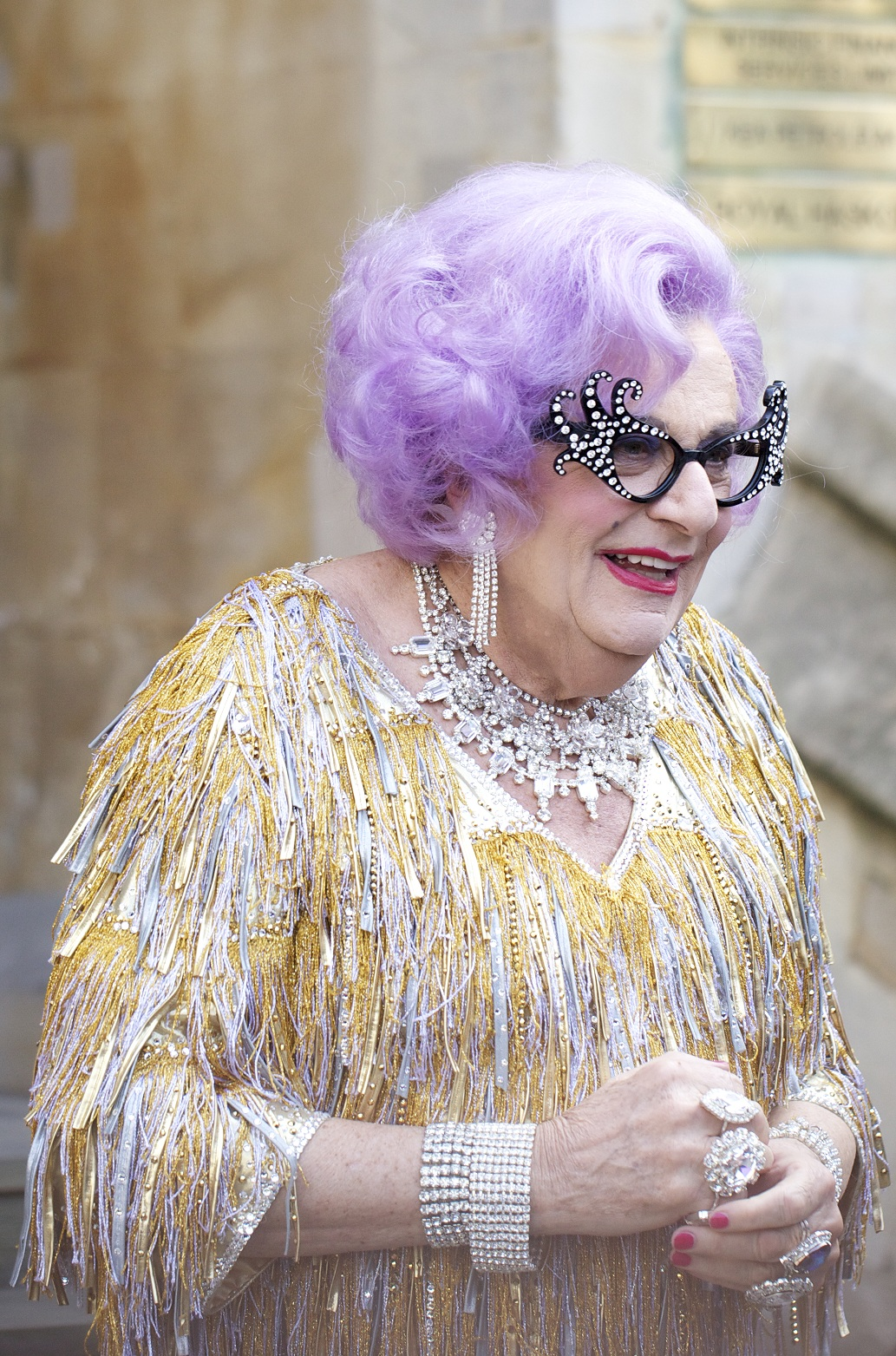
Dame Edna Everage, a comic creation of Barry Humphries

Comedy is an important part of the Australian identity. The "Australian sense of humour" is characterised as dry and sarcastic, exemplified by the works of performing artists like Barry Humphries and Paul Hogan.

The convicts of the early colonial period helped establish anti-authoritarianism as a hallmark of Australian comedy. Influential in the establishment of stoic, dry wit as a characteristic of Australian humour were the bush balladeers of the 19th century, including Henry Lawson, author of "The Loaded Dog". His contemporary, Banjo Paterson, contributed a number of classic comic poems including The Man from Ironbark and The Geebung Polo Club. CJ Dennis wrote humour in the Australian vernacular – notably in The Songs of a Sentimental Bloke. The Dad and Dave series about a farming family was an enduring hit of the early 20th century. The World War I ANZAC troops were said to often display irreverence in their relations with superior officers and dark humour in the face of battle.

Australian comedy has a strong tradition of self-mockery, from the outlandish Barry McKenzie expat-in-Europe ocker comedies of the 1970s, to the quirky outback characters of the "Crocodile" Dundee films of the 1980s, the suburban parody of Working Dog Productions' 1997 film The Castle and the dysfunctional suburban mother–daughter sitcom Kath & Kim. In the 1970s, satirical talk-show host Norman Gunston (played by Garry McDonald), with his malapropisms, sweep-over hair and poorly shaven face, rose to great popularity by pioneering the satirical "ambush" interview technique and giving unique interpretations of pop songs. Roy and HG provide an affectionate but irreverent parody of Australia's obsession with sport.

The unique character and humour of Australian culture was defined in cartoons by immigrants, Emile Mercier and George Molnar, and in the novel They're a Weird Mob (1957) by John O'Grady, which looks at Sydney through the eyes of an Italian immigrant. Post-war immigration has seen migrant humour flourish through the works of Vietnamese refugee Anh Do, Egyptian-Australian stand-up comic Akmal Saleh and Greek-Australian actor Nick Giannopoulos.

Since the 1950s, the satirical character creations of Barry Humphries have included housewife "gigastar" Edna Everage and "Australian cultural attaché" Les Patterson, whose interests include boozing, chasing women and flatulence. For his delivery of dadaist and absurdist humour to millions, biographer Anne Pender described Humphries in 2010 as "the most significant comedian to emerge since Charlie Chaplin".

The vaudeville talents of Daryl Somers, Graham Kennedy, Don Lane and Bert Newton earned popular success during the early years of Australian television. The variety show Hey Hey It's Saturday screened for three decades. Among the best loved Australian sitcoms was Mother and Son, about a divorcee who had moved back into the suburban home of his mother – but sketch comedy has been the stalwart of Australian television. The Comedy Company, in the 1980s, featured the comic talents of Mary-Anne Fahey, Ian McFadyen, Mark Mitchell, Glenn Robbins, Kym Gyngell and others. Growing out of Melbourne University and The D-Generation came The Late Show (1991–1993), starring the influential talents Santo Cilauro, Tom Gleisner, Jane Kennedy, Tony Martin, Mick Molloy and Rob Sitch (who later formed Working Dog Productions); and during the 1980s and 1990s Fast Forward (Steve Vizard, Magda Szubanski, Marg Downey, Michael Veitch, Peter Moon and others) and its successor Full Frontal, which launched the career of Eric Bana and featured Shaun Micallef.

The perceptive wit of Clive James and Andrew Denton has been popular in the talk-show interview style. Representatives of the "bawdy" strain of Australian comedy include Rodney Rude, Austen Tayshus and Chad Morgan. Rolf Harris helped defined a comic tradition in Australian music.

Cynical satire has had enduring popularity, with television series such as Frontline, targeting the inner workings of "news and current affairs" TV journalism, The Hollowmen (2008), set in the office of the prime minister's political advisory (spin) department, and The Chaser's War on Everything, which cynically examines domestic and international politics. Actor/writer Chris Lilley has produced a series of award-winning "mockumentary" style television series about Australian characters since 2005.

The annual Melbourne International Comedy Festival is one of the largest comedy festivals in the world, and a popular fixture on the city's cultural calendar.

== Arts ==
The arts in Australia—film, music, painting, theatre, dance and crafts—have achieved international recognition. While much of Australia's cultural output has traditionally tended to fit with general trends and styles in Western arts, the arts as practised by Indigenous Australians represent a unique Australian cultural tradition, and Australia's landscape and history have contributed to some unique variations in the styles inherited by Australia's various migrant communities.

=== Literature ===
As the convict era passed—captured most famously in Marcus Clarke's For the Term of His Natural Life (1874), a seminal work of Tasmanian Gothic—the bush and Australian daily life assumed primacy as subjects. Charles Harpur, Henry Kendall and Adam Lindsay Gordon won fame in the mid-19th century for their lyric nature poems and patriotic verse. Gordon drew on Australian colloquy and idiom; Clarke assessed his work as "the beginnings of a national school of Australian poetry". First published in serial form in 1882, Rolf Boldrewood's Robbery Under Arms is regarded as the classic bushranging novel for its vivid use of the bush vernacular and realistic detail of situations in the Australian bush.

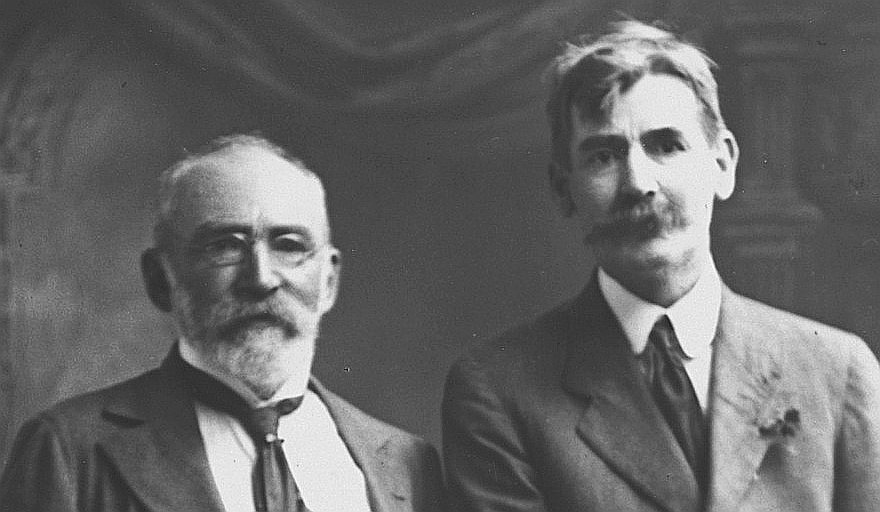
The Bulletin, founded by J. F. Archibald (left), nurtured bush poets such as Henry Lawson (right).

Founded in 1880, The Bulletin did much to create the idea of an Australian national character—one of anti-authoritarianism, egalitarianism, mateship and a concern for the "battler"—forged against the brutalities of the bush. This image was expressed within the works of its bush poets, the most famous of which are Henry Lawson, widely regarded as Australia's finest short-story writer, and Banjo Paterson, author of classics such as "Clancy of the Overflow" (1889) and "The Man From Snowy River" (1890). In a literary debate about the nature of life in the bush, Lawson said Paterson was a romantic while Paterson attacked Lawson's pessimistic outlook. C. J. Dennis wrote humour in the Australian vernacular, notably in the verse novel The Songs of a Sentimental Bloke (1915), while Dorothy Mackellar wrote the iconic patriotic poem "My Country" (1908) which rejected prevailing fondness for England's "green and shaded lanes" and declared: "I love a sunburned country". Early Australian children's literature was also embedded in the bush tradition; perennial favourites include Norman Lindsay's The Magic Pudding (1918), May Gibbs' Snugglepot and Cuddlepie (1918) and Dorothy Wall's Blinky Bill (1933).

Significant poets of the early 20th century include Kenneth Slessor, Mary Gilmore and Judith Wright. The nationalist Jindyworobak Movement arose in the 1930s and sought to develop a distinctive Australian poetry through the appropriation of Aboriginal languages and ideas. In contrast, the Angry Penguins, centred around Max Harris' journal of the same name, promoted international modernism. A backlash resulted in the Ern Malley affair of 1943, Australia's most famous literary hoax.

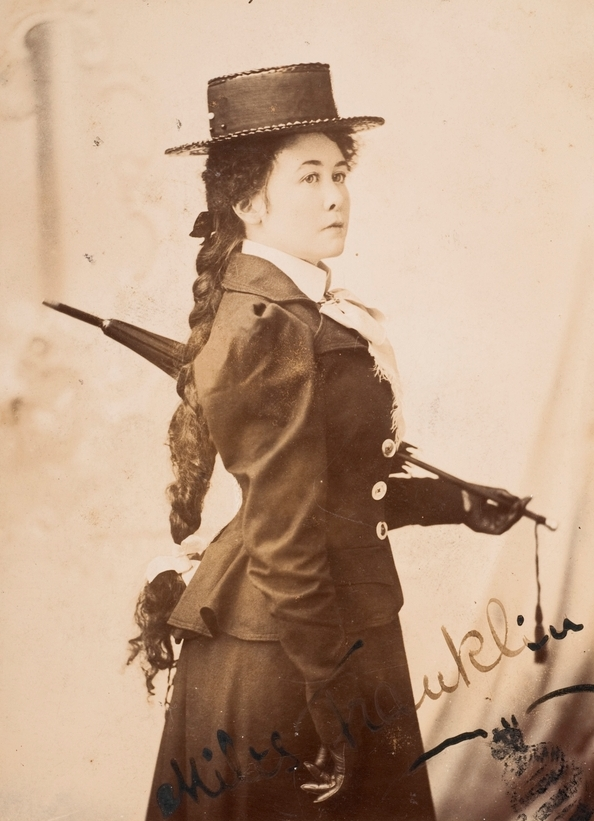
Miles Franklin, founder and namesake of Australia's most prestigious literary award

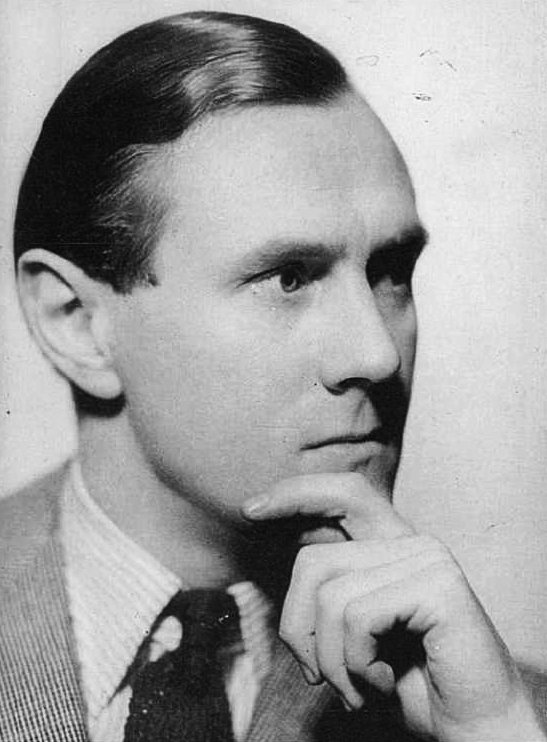
Patrick White, winner of the first Miles Franklin Award and the Nobel Prize in Literature

The legacy of Miles Franklin, renowned for her 1901 novel My Brilliant Career, is the Miles Franklin Award, which is "presented each year to a novel which is of the highest literary merit and presents Australian life in any of its phases". Patrick White won the inaugural award for Voss in 1957; he went on to win the 1973 Nobel Prize in Literature. Peter Carey, Thomas Keneally and Richard Flanagan are recipients of the Booker Prize. Other acclaimed Australian authors include Colleen McCullough, Nevil Shute, Tim Winton, Ruth Park and Morris West. Helen Garner's 1977 novel Monkey Grip is widely considered one of Australia's first contemporary novels–she has since written both fiction and non-fiction work. Notable expatriate authors include the feminist Germaine Greer and humourist Clive James. Greer's controversial 1970 nonfiction book The Female Eunuch became a global bestseller and is considered a watershed feminist text. Among the best known contemporary poets are Les Murray and Bruce Dawe.

David Unaipon is known as the first Indigenous Australian author. Oodgeroo Noonuccal was the first Aboriginal Australian to publish a book of verse. A significant contemporary account of the experiences of Indigenous Australia can be found in Sally Morgan's My Place. Contemporary academics and activists including Marcia Langton and Noel Pearson are prominent essayists and authors on Aboriginal issues.

Charles Bean (The Story of Anzac: From the Outbreak of War to the End of the First Phase of the Gallipoli Campaign 4 May 1915, 1921) Geoffrey Blainey (The Tyranny of Distance, 1966), Robert Hughes (The Fatal Shore, 1987), Manning Clark (A History of Australia, 1962–87), and Marcia Langton (First Australians, 2008) are authors of important Australian histories.

=== Theatre ===
European traditions came to Australia with the First Fleet in 1788, with the first production being performed in 1789 by convicts. In 1988, the year of Australia's bicentenary, the circumstances of the foundations of Australian theatre were recounted in Timberlake Wertenbaker's play Our Country's Good.

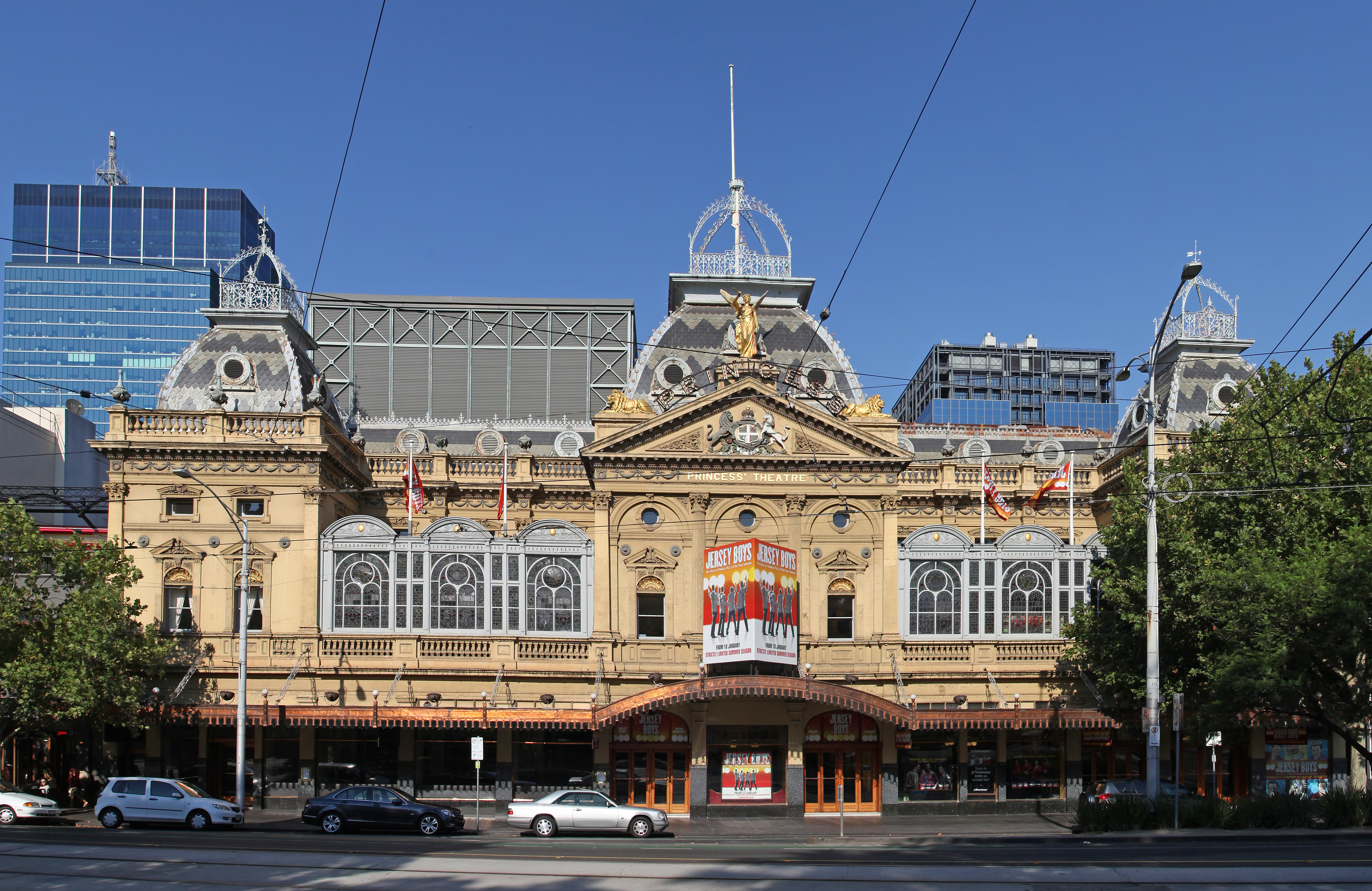
The Princess Theatre in Melbourne

Hobart's Theatre Royal opened in 1837 and is Australia's oldest continuously operating theatre. Inaugurated in 1839, the Melbourne Athenaeum is one of Melbourne's oldest cultural institutions, and Adelaide's Queen's Theatre, established in 1841, is today the oldest purpose-built theatre on the mainland. The mid-19th-century gold rushes provided funds for the construction of grand theatres in the Victorian style, such as the Princess Theatre in Melbourne, established in 1854.

After Federation in 1901, theatre productions evidenced the new sense of national identity. On Our Selection (1912), based on the stories of Steele Rudd, portrays a pioneer farming family and became immensely popular. Sydney's grand Capitol Theatre opened in 1928 and after restoration remains one of the nation's finest auditoriums.

In 1955, Summer of the Seventeenth Doll by Ray Lawler portrayed resolutely Australian characters and went on to international acclaim. That same year, young Melbourne artist Barry Humphries performed as Edna Everage for the first time at Melbourne University's Union Theatre. His satirical stage creations, notably Dame Edna and Les Patterson, became Australian cultural icons. Humphries also achieved success in the US with tours on Broadway and has been honored in Australia and Britain.

Founded in Sydney 1958, the National Institute of Dramatic Art boasts famous alumni including Cate Blanchett, Mel Gibson and Hugo Weaving. Construction of the Adelaide Festival Center began in 1970 and South Australia's Sir Robert Helpmann became director of the Adelaide Festival of Arts. The new wave of Australian theatre debuted in the 1970s as "a new and more realistic look into [Australia's] beginnings as a nation". It explored the confrontation in social relations, the use of vernacular language and expressions of masculine social habits in contemporary Australia. The Belvoir St Theatre presented works by Nick Enright and David Williamson. The Sydney Opera House, inaugurated in 1973, is the home of Opera Australia and the Sydney Theatre Company.

The Bell Shakespeare Company was created in 1990. A period of success for Australian musical theatre came in the 1990s with the debut of musical biographies of Australian music singers Peter Allen (The Boy From Oz in 1998) and Johnny O'Keefe (Shout! The Legend of The Wild One).

In The One Day of the Year, Alan Seymour studied the paradoxical nature of the ANZAC Day commemoration by Australians of the defeat of the Battle of Gallipoli. Ngapartji Ngapartji, by Scott Rankin and Trevor Jamieson, recounts the story of the effects on the Pitjantjatjara people of nuclear testing in the Western Desert during the Cold War. It is an example of the contemporary fusion of traditions of drama in Australia with Pitjantjatjara actors being supported by a multicultural cast of Greek, Afghan, Japanese and New Zealand heritage.

=== Architecture ===
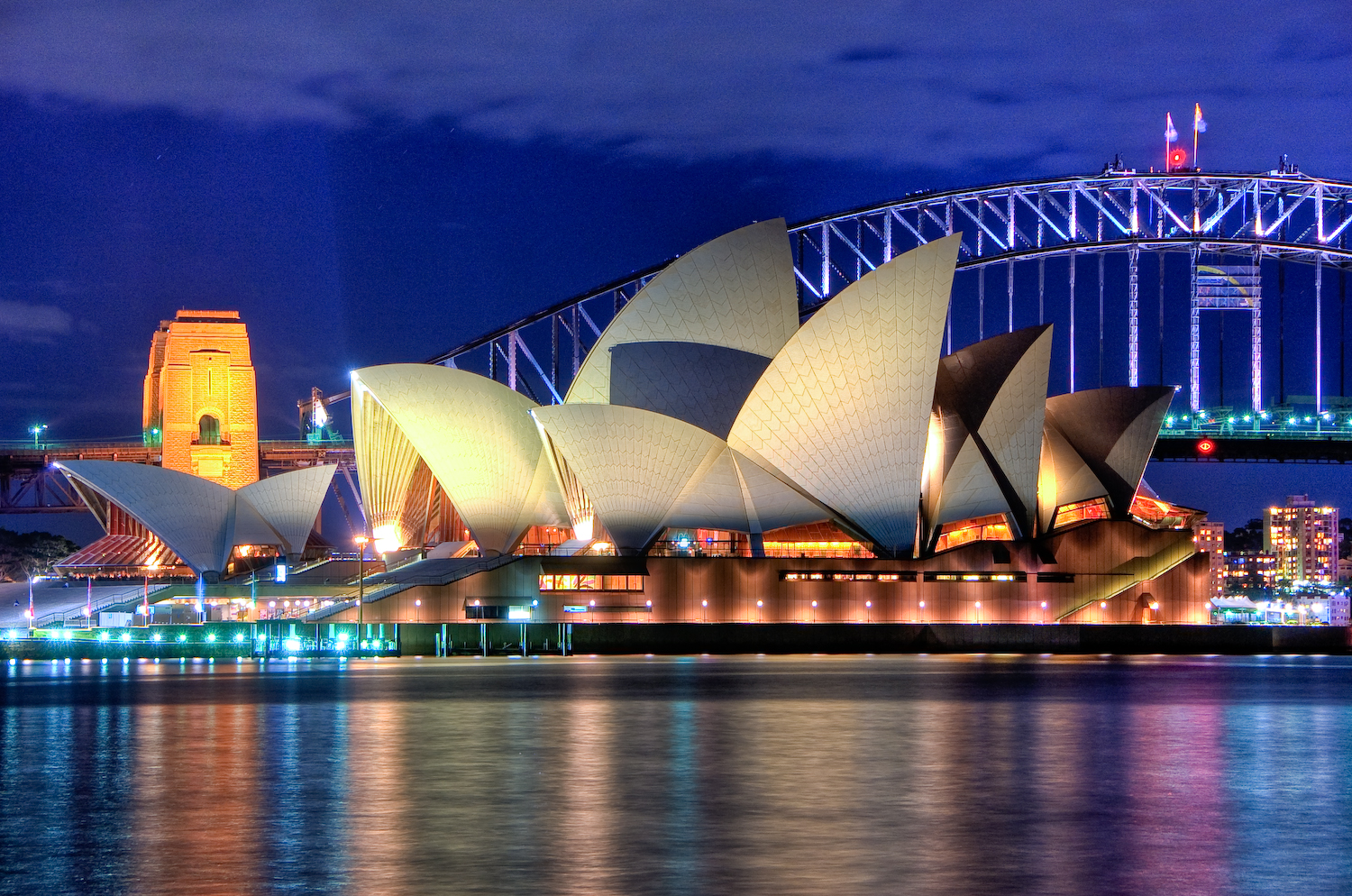
Sydney Opera House (foreground) and Sydney Harbour Bridge

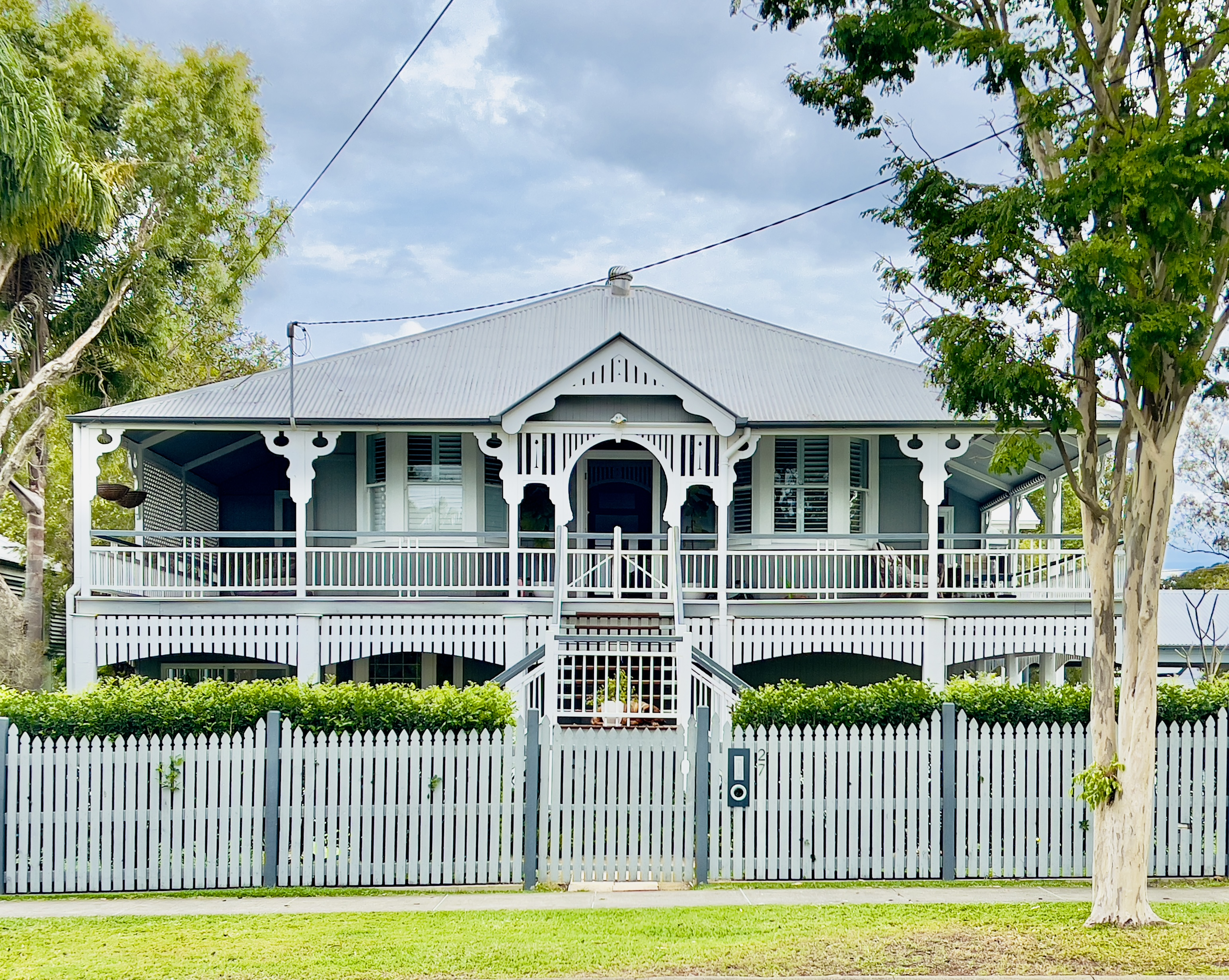
A high-set Victorian-era Queenslander with a large veranda in Brisbane

Australia has three architectural listings on UNESCO's World Heritage list: Australian Convict Sites (comprising a collection of 11 separate sites around Australia, including Hyde Park Barracks in Sydney, Port Arthur in Tasmania, and Fremantle Prison in Western Australia); the Sydney Opera House; and the Royal Exhibition Building in Melbourne. Examples of contemporary Australian architecture includes the Shine Dome in Canberra, considered "the only true example in Australia of geometric structuralism"; the Sydney Harbour Bridge, the bridge with the second longest span when completed; and the Sidney Myer Music Bowl, Melbourne's first major purpose-built. Significant architects who have worked in Australia include Governor Lachlan Macquarie's colonial architect, Francis Greenway; the ecclesiastical neo-Gothic architect William Wardell; the designer of Canberra's layout, Walter Burley Griffin; the modernist Harry Seidler; and Jørn Utzon, designer of the Sydney Opera House. The National Trust of Australia is a non-governmental organisation charged with protecting Australia's built heritage.

Evidence of permanent structures built by Indigenous Australians before European settlement of Australia in 1788 is limited. Much of what they built was temporary, and was used for housing and other needs. As a British colony, the first European buildings were derivative of the European fashions of the time. Tents and wattle and daub huts preceded more substantial structures. Georgian architecture is seen in early government buildings of Sydney and Tasmania and the homes of the wealthy. While the major Australian cities enjoyed the boom of the Victorian era, the Australian gold rushes of the mid-19th century brought major construction works and exuberant Victorian architecture to the major cities, particularly Melbourne, and regional cities such as Ballarat and Bendigo. Other significant architectural movements in Australian architecture include the Federation style at the turn of the 20th century, and the modern styles of the late 20th century which also saw many older buildings demolished. The Victorian and Federation eras saw the development of the Filigree style, style of vernacular architecture developed by early European migrants as a response to the new subtropical climate. The style favoured the usage of ornamental verandahs, both for decorative and climatic cooling purposes. The Queenslander developed in Queensland and the northern parts of New South Wales as a regional variation of the Filigree style, as is strongly associated with that region's iconography.

Religious architecture is also prominent throughout Australia, with large Anglican and Catholic cathedrals in every major city and Christian churches in most towns. Notable examples include St Patrick's Cathedral, Melbourne and St Mary's Cathedral, Sydney. Other houses of worship are also common, reflecting the cultural diversity existing in Australia; the oldest Islamic structure in the Southern Hemisphere is the Central Adelaide Mosque (built in the 1880s), and one of the Southern Hemisphere's largest Buddhist Temples is Wollongong's Nan Tien Temple. Sydney's Gothic-style Great Synagogue was consecrated in 1878.

Coffee palaces are large and elaborate examples of High Victorian and Second Empire styles. Historically, Australian pubs have also been noted for often distinctive designs.

Significant concern was raised during the 1960s, with developers threatening the destruction of historical buildings, especially in Sydney. Heritage concerns led to union-initiated green bans, which saved significant examples of Australia's architectural past. Green bans helped to protect historic 18th-century buildings in The Rocks from being demolished to make way for office towers, and prevented the Royal Botanic Gardens from being turned into a car park for the Sydney Opera House.

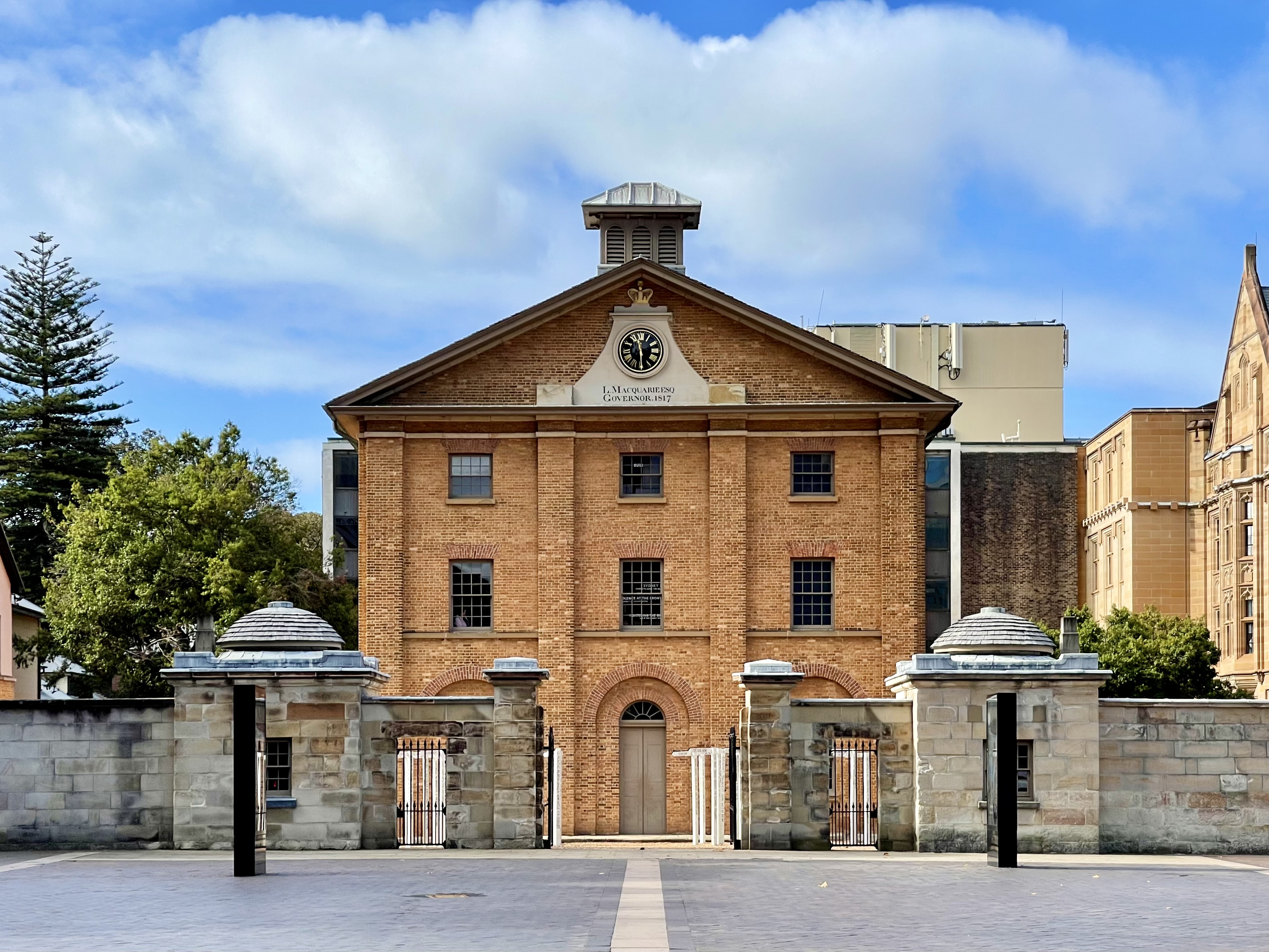
Hyde Park Barracks, Sydney

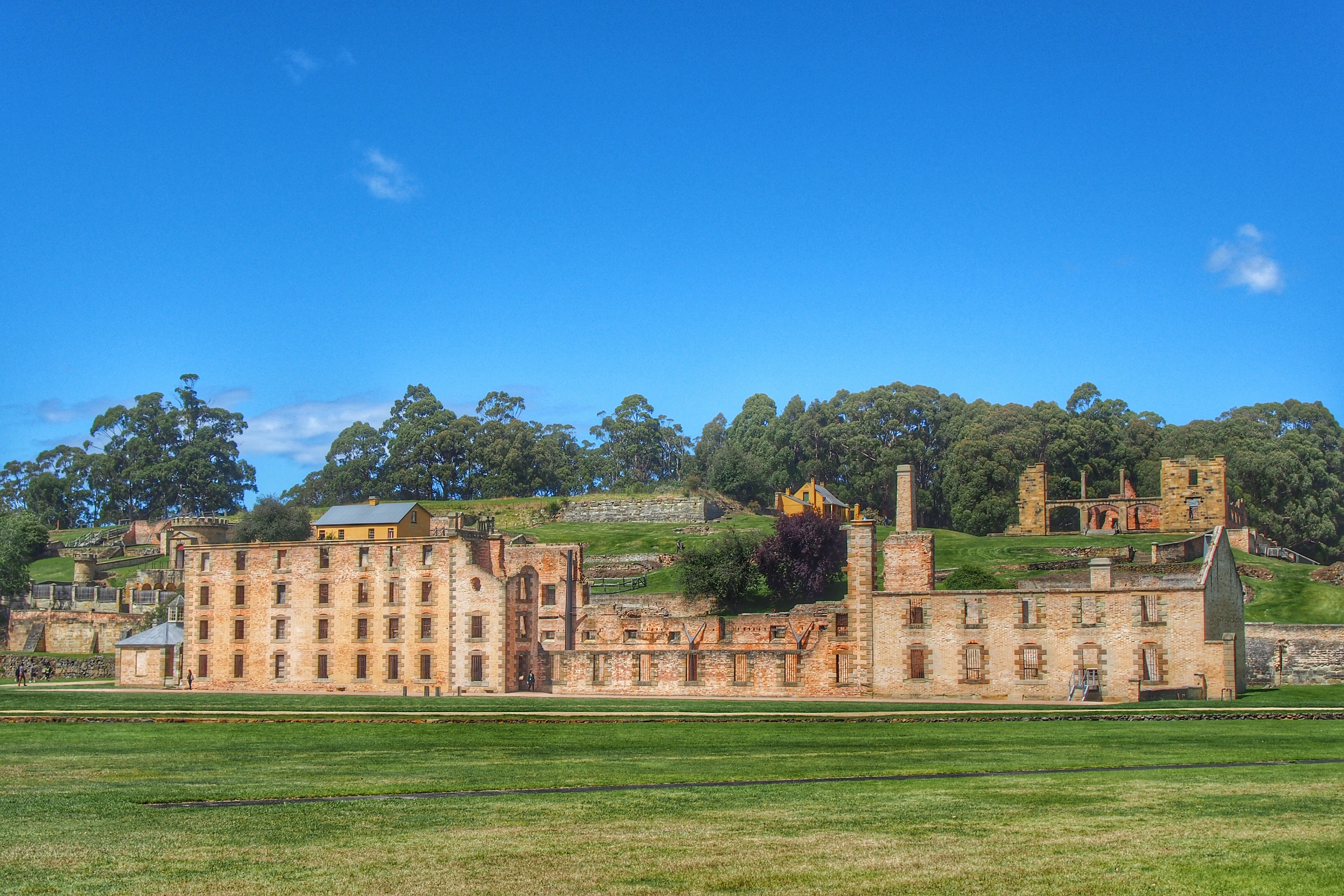
Convict architecture at Port Arthur, Tasmania

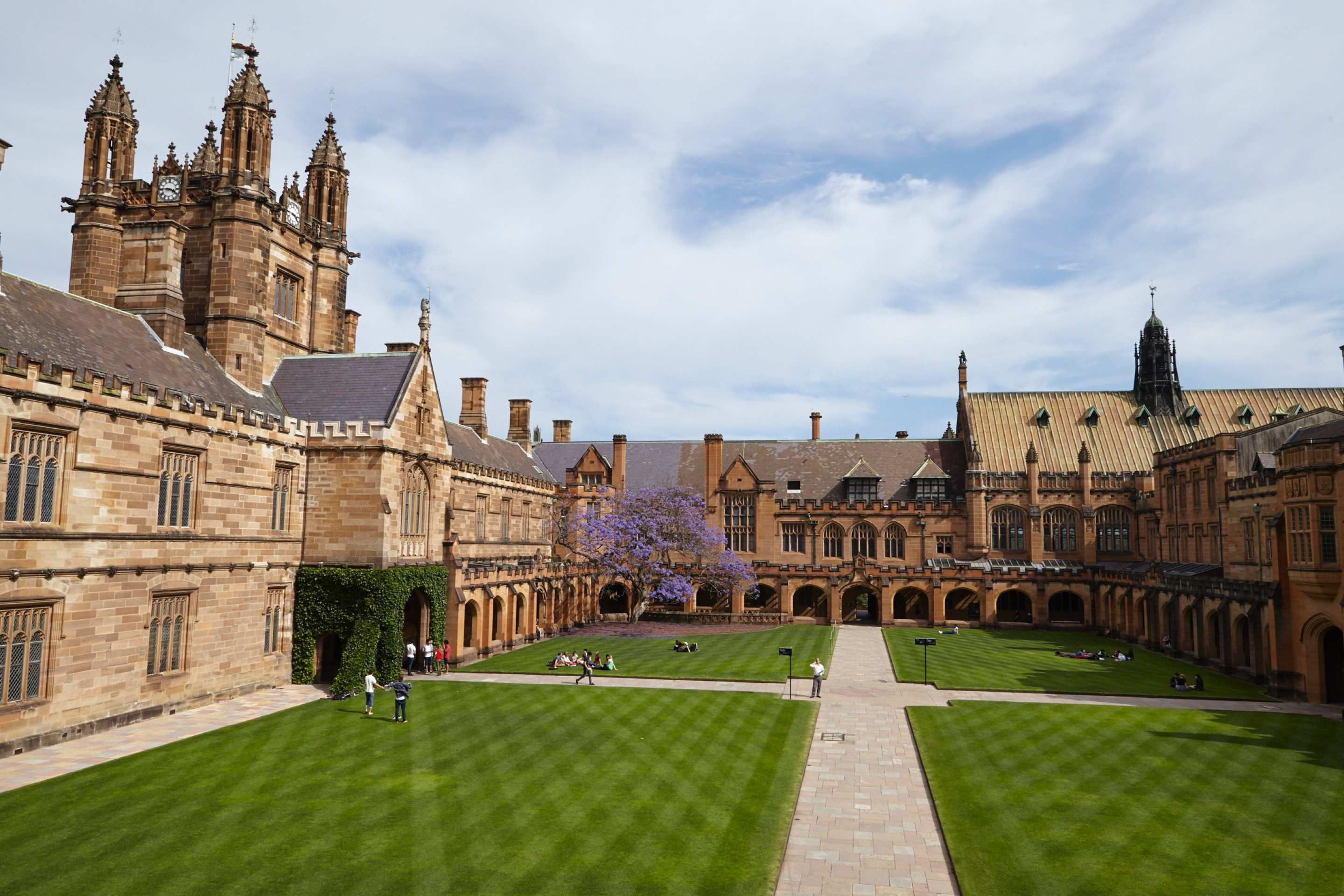
The University of Sydney

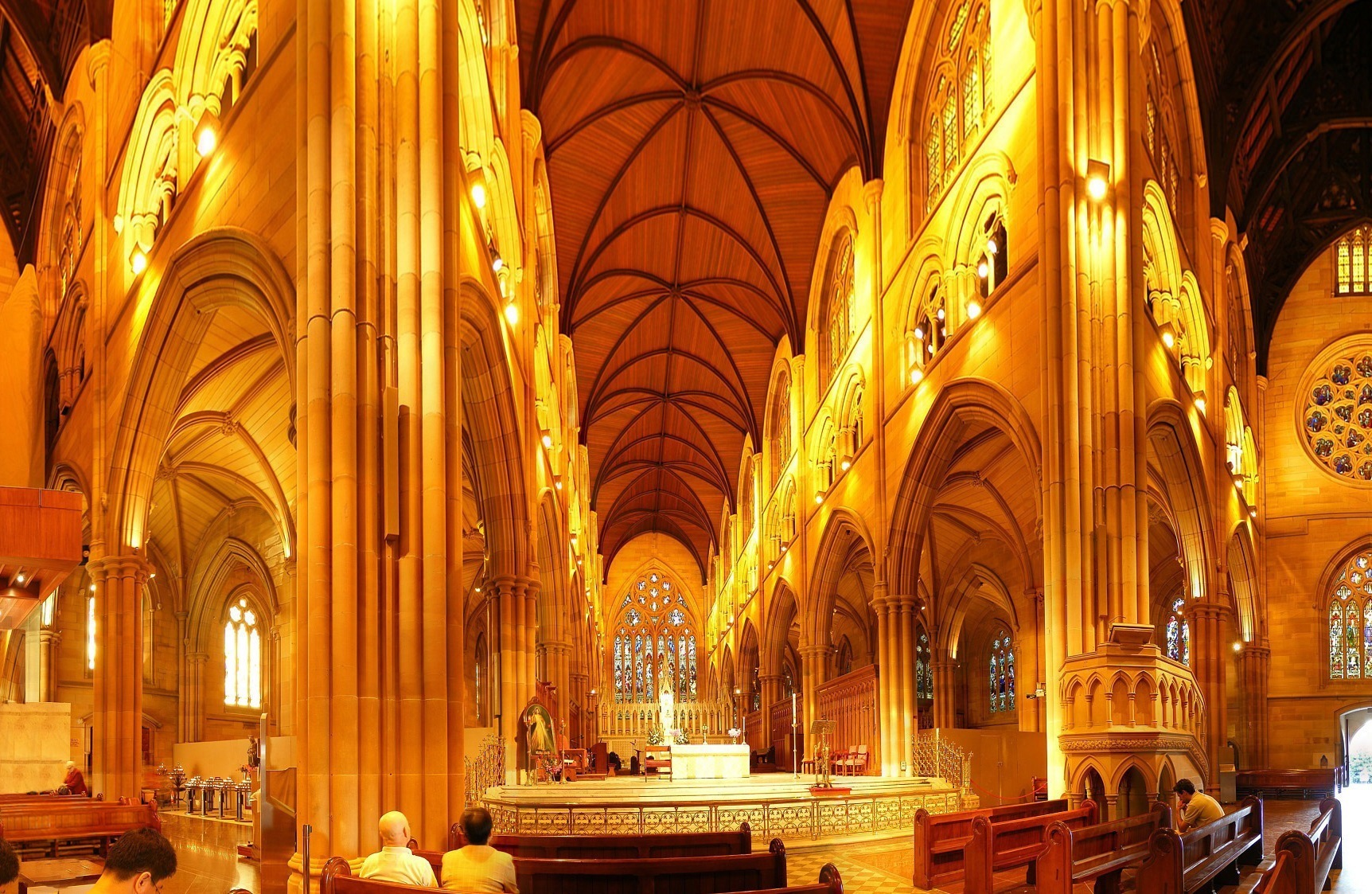
Interior of St Mary's Cathedral, Sydney

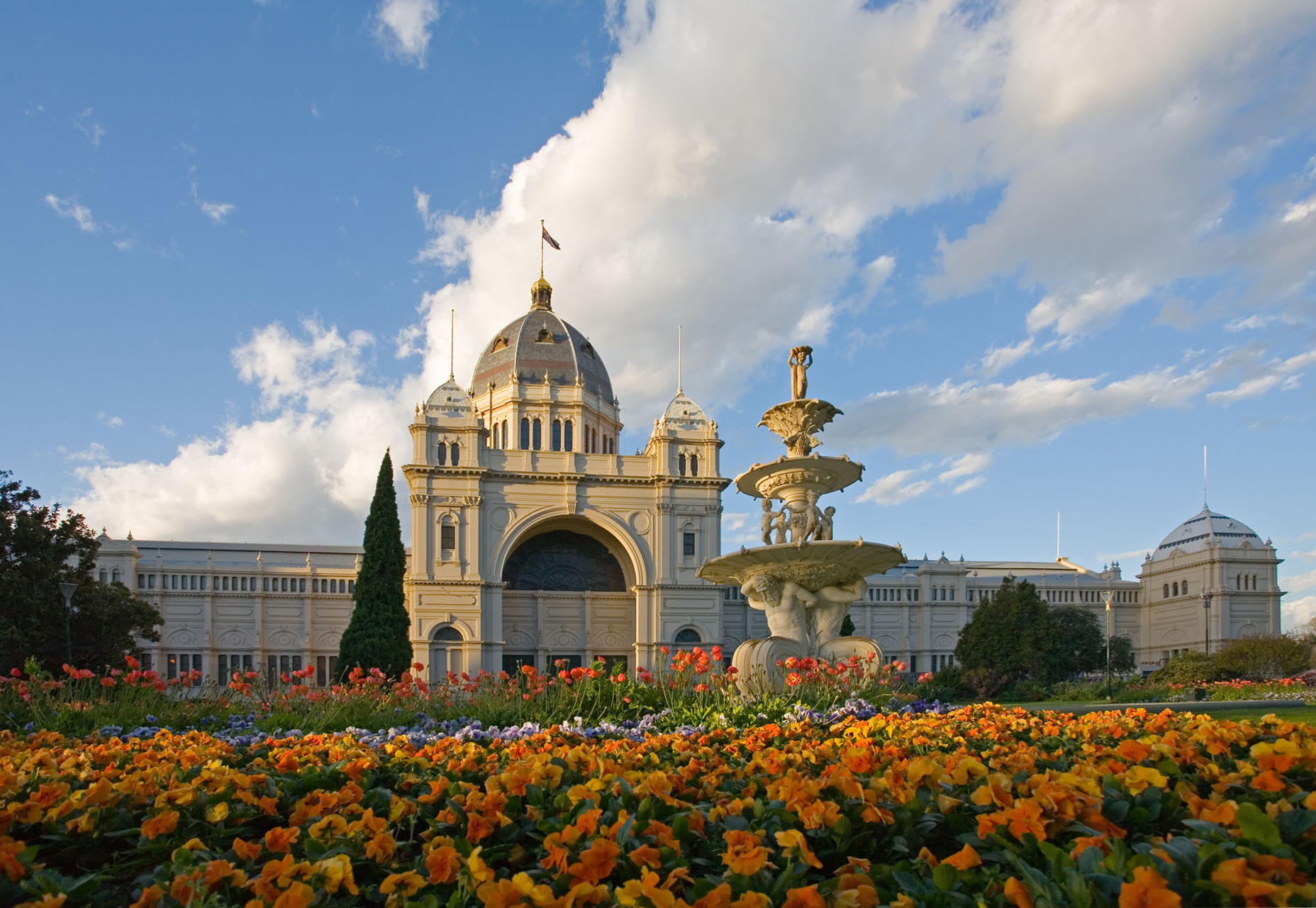
The Royal Exhibition Building, Melbourne

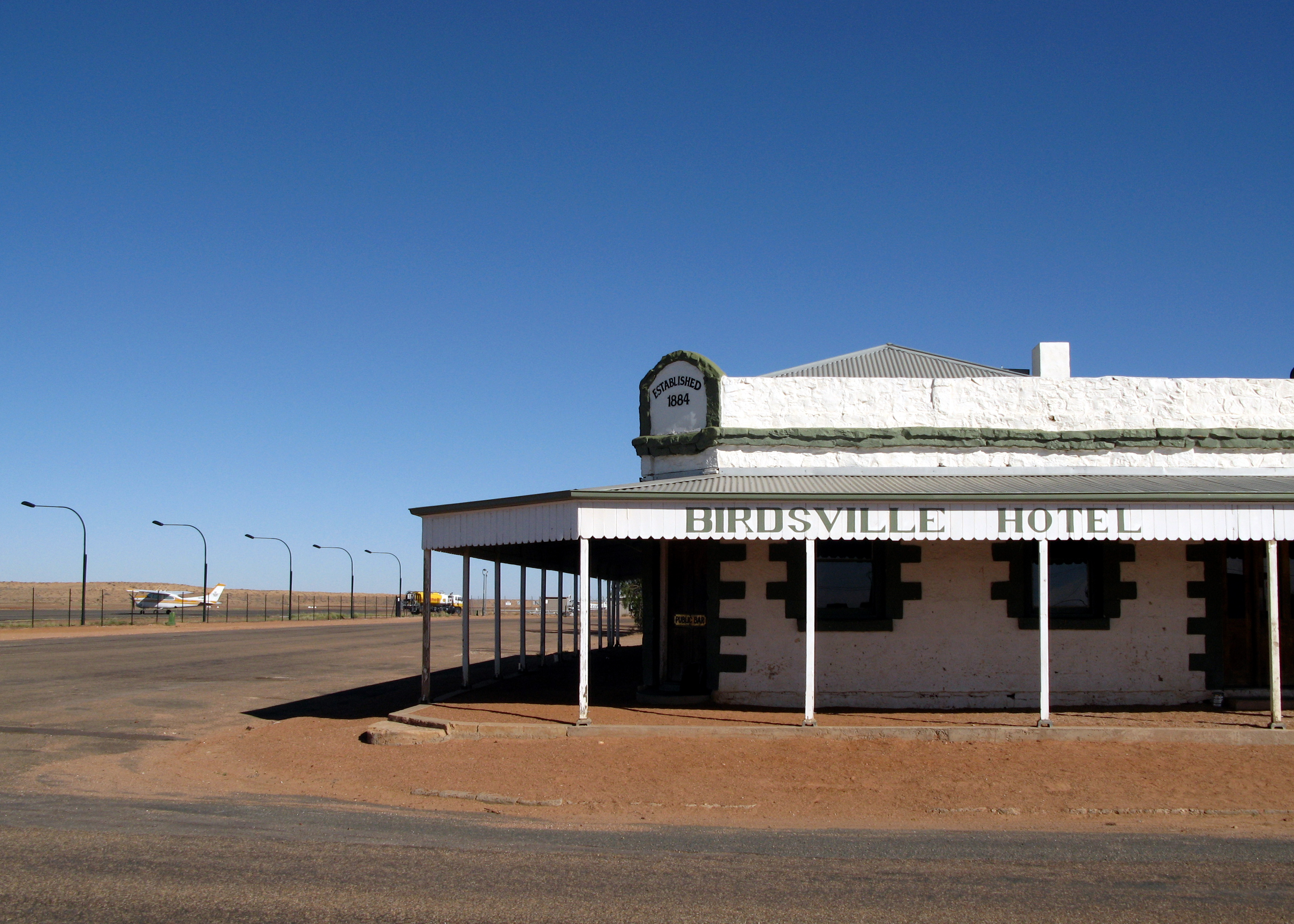
Birdsville Hotel, an Australian pub in outback Queensland

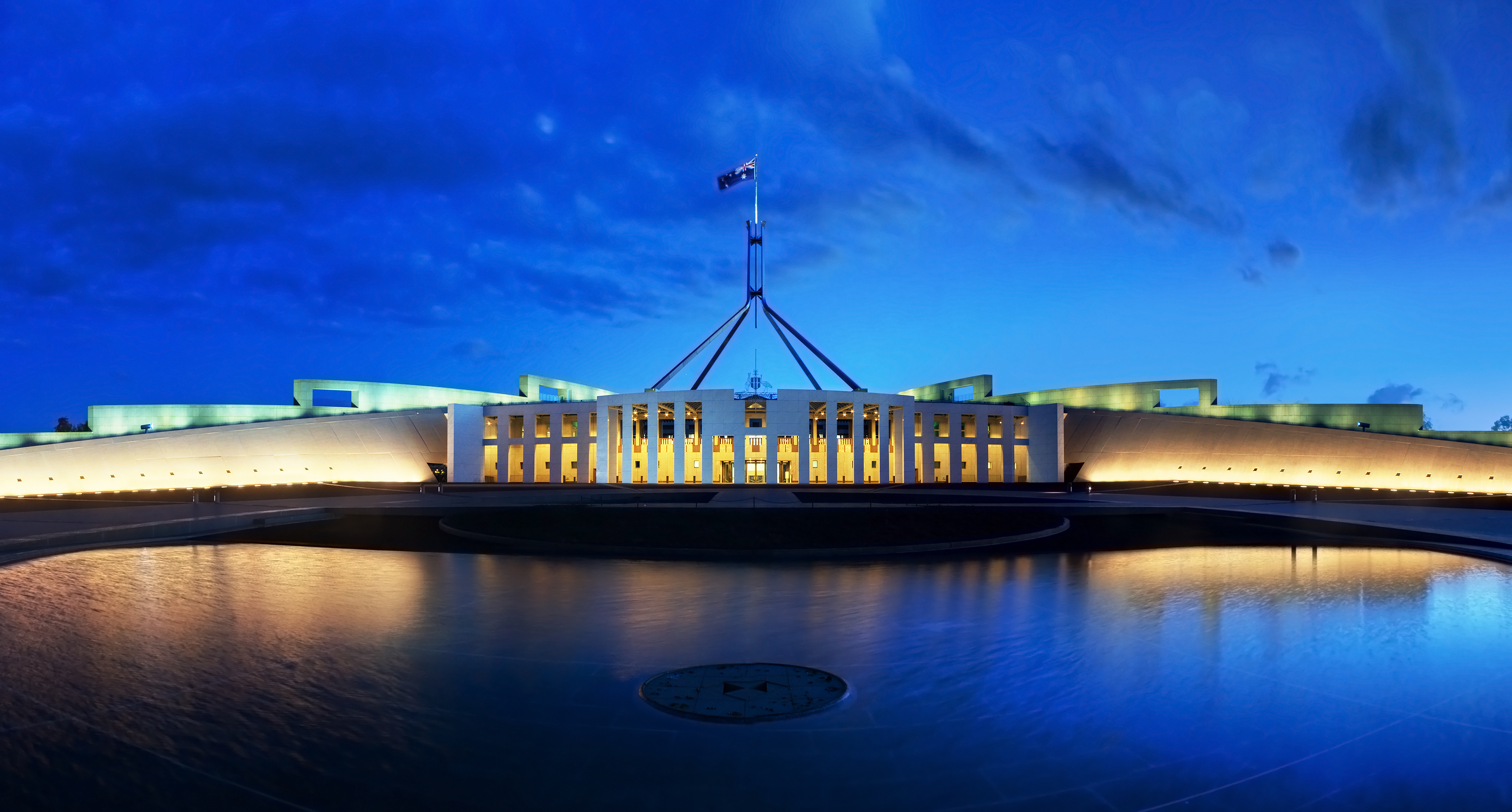
Parliament House, Canberra

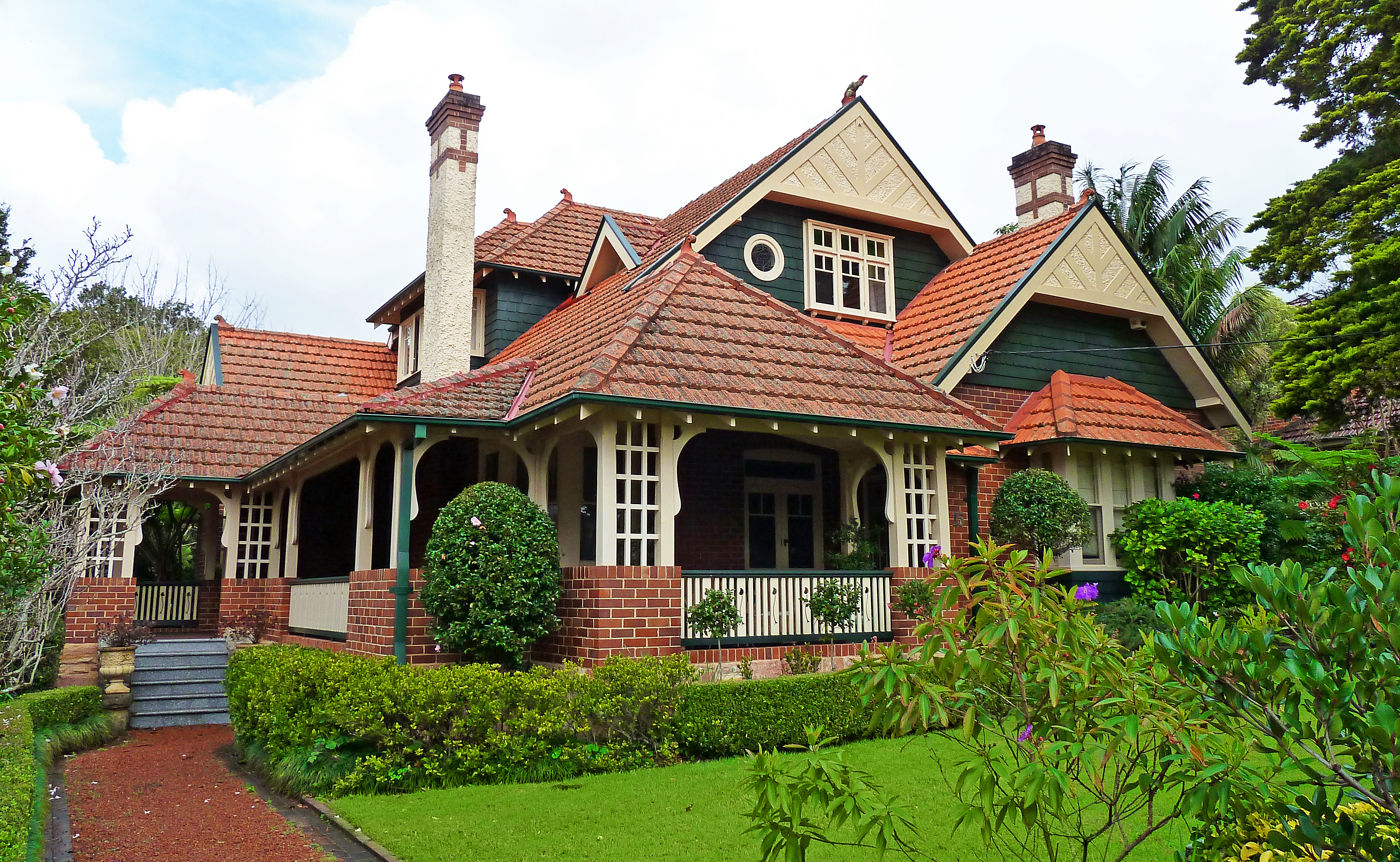
Federation Bungalow in Killara, Sydney

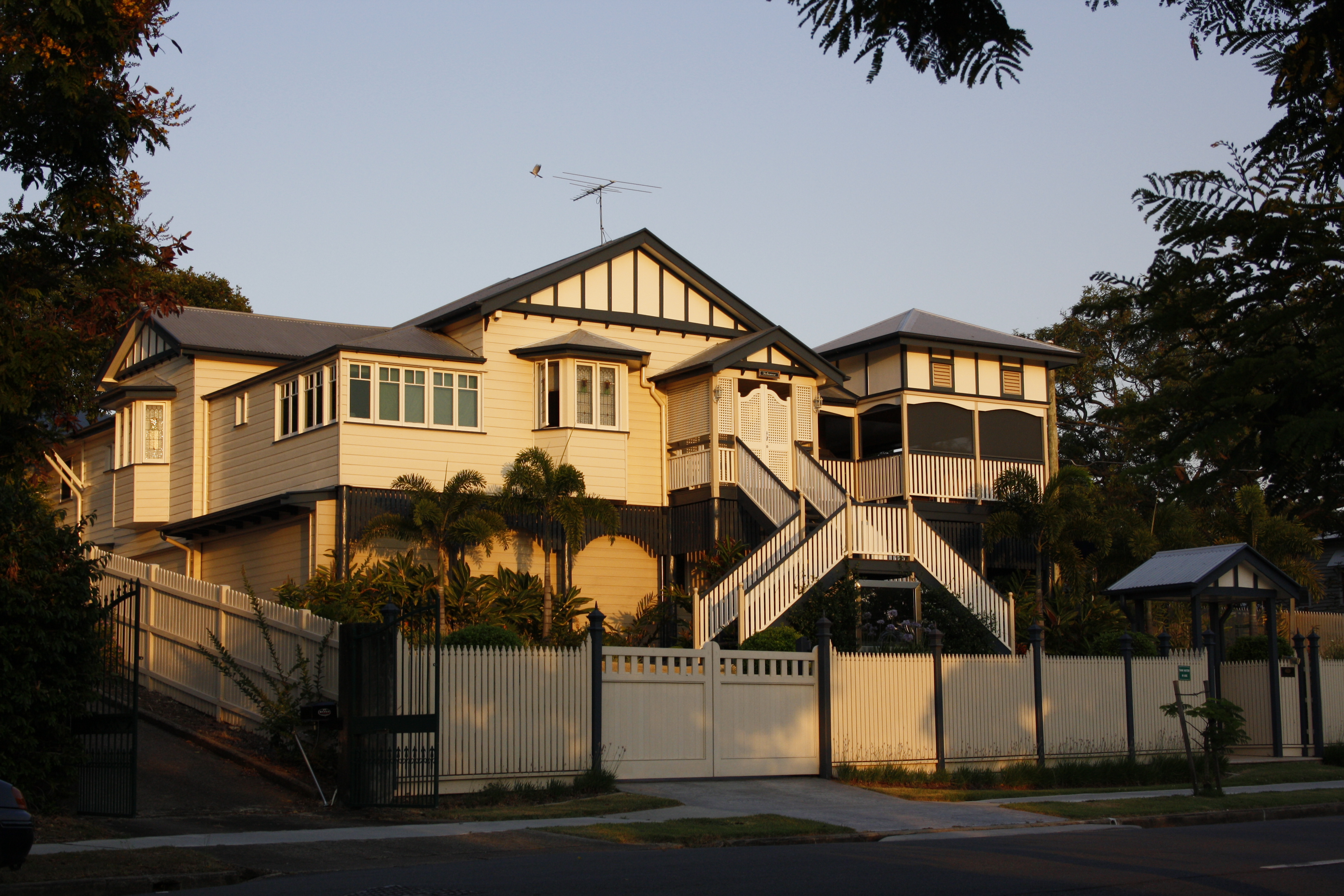
A typical Queenslander house in Brisbane

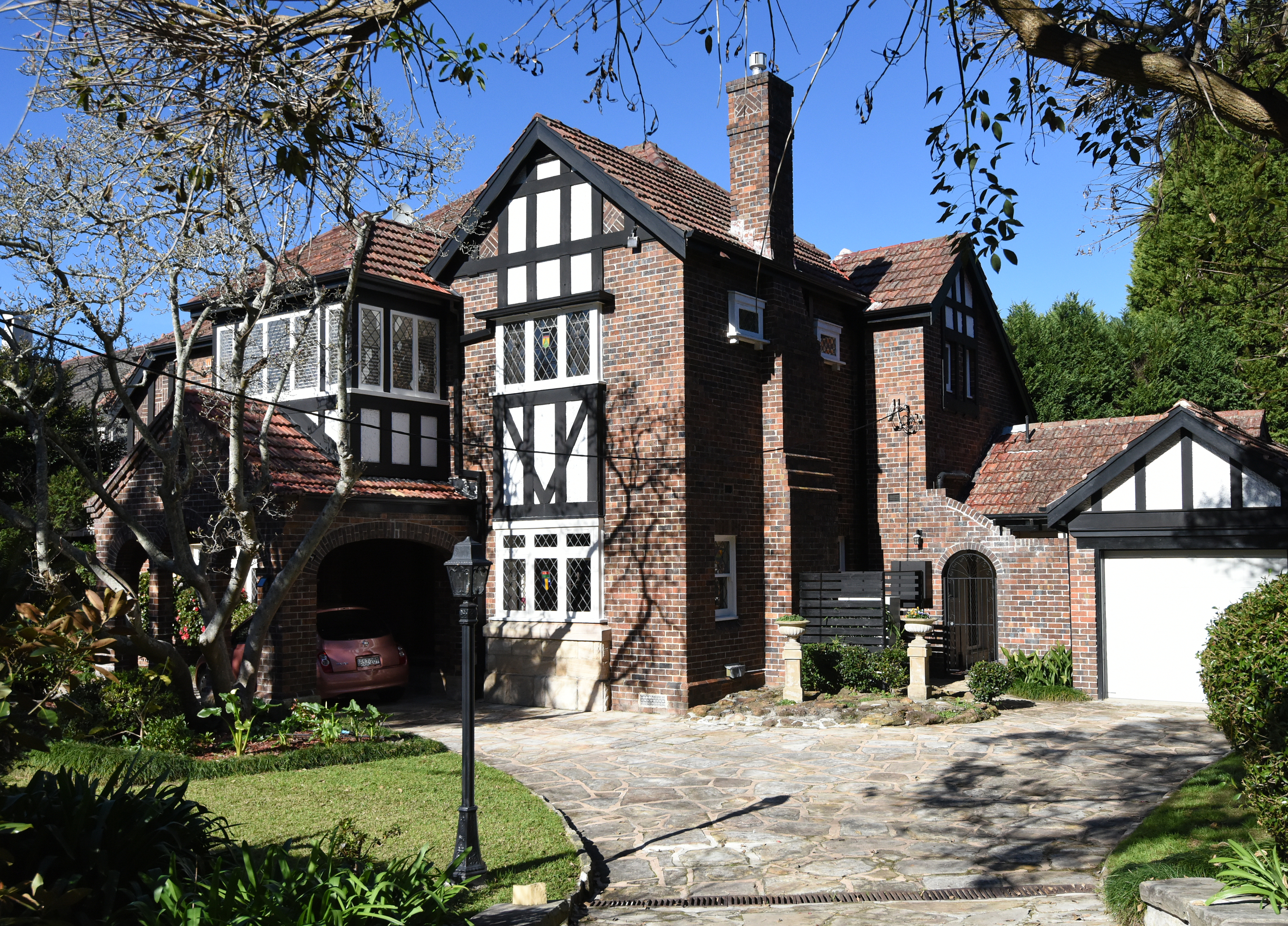
Tudor Revival house in Killara, New South Wales

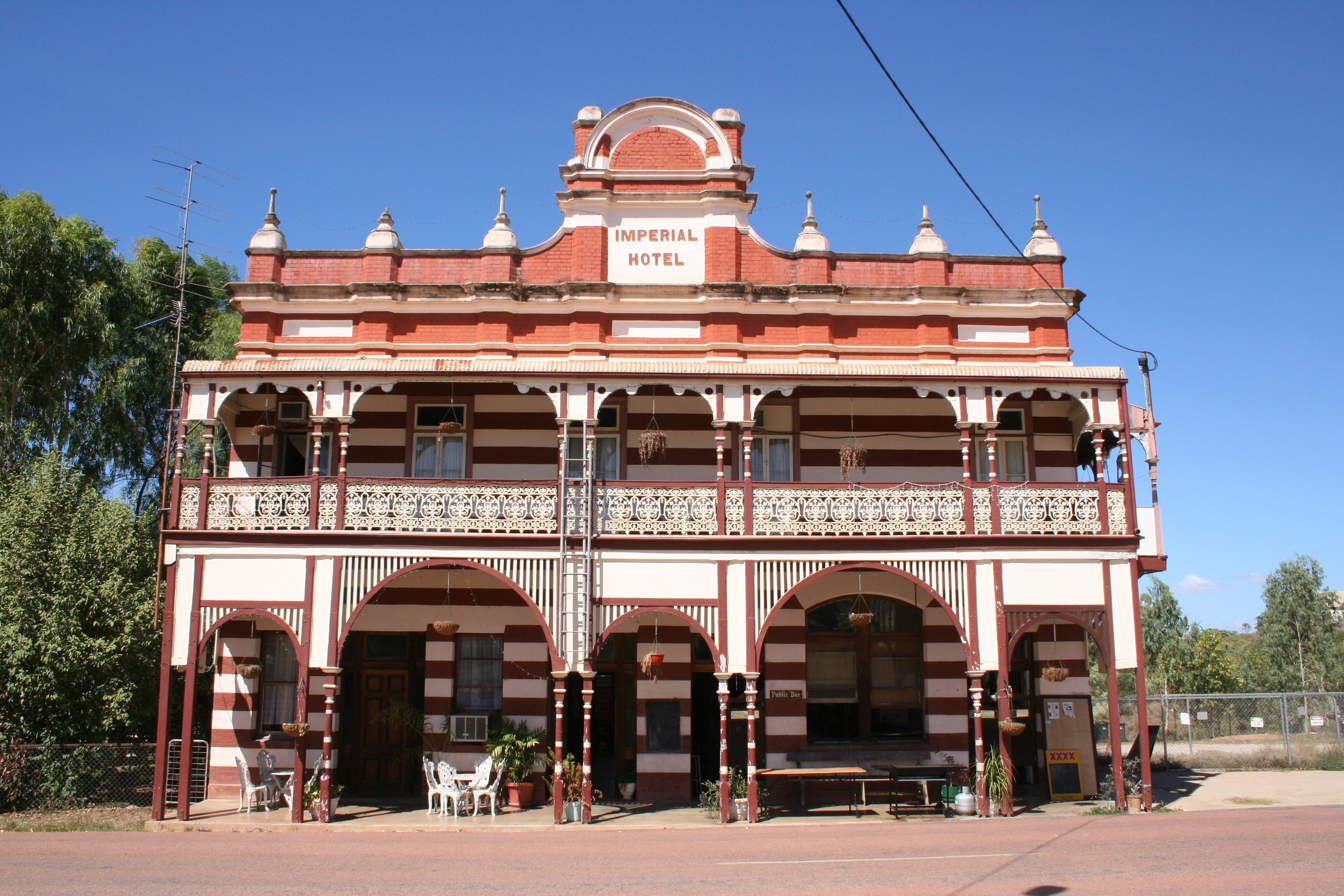
The verandah is the dominant feature of this Federation Filigree-style pub in Ravenswood.

=== Visual arts ===
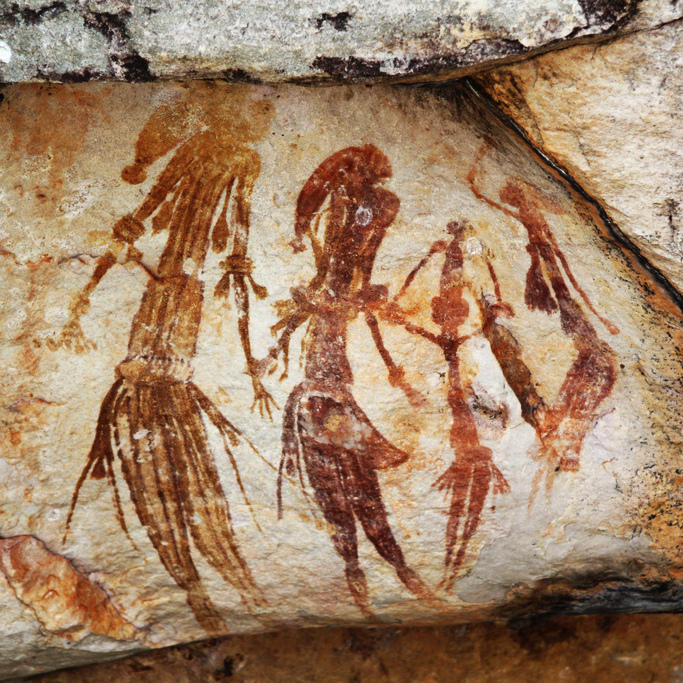
Gwion Gwion rock paintings in the Kimberley region of Western Australia

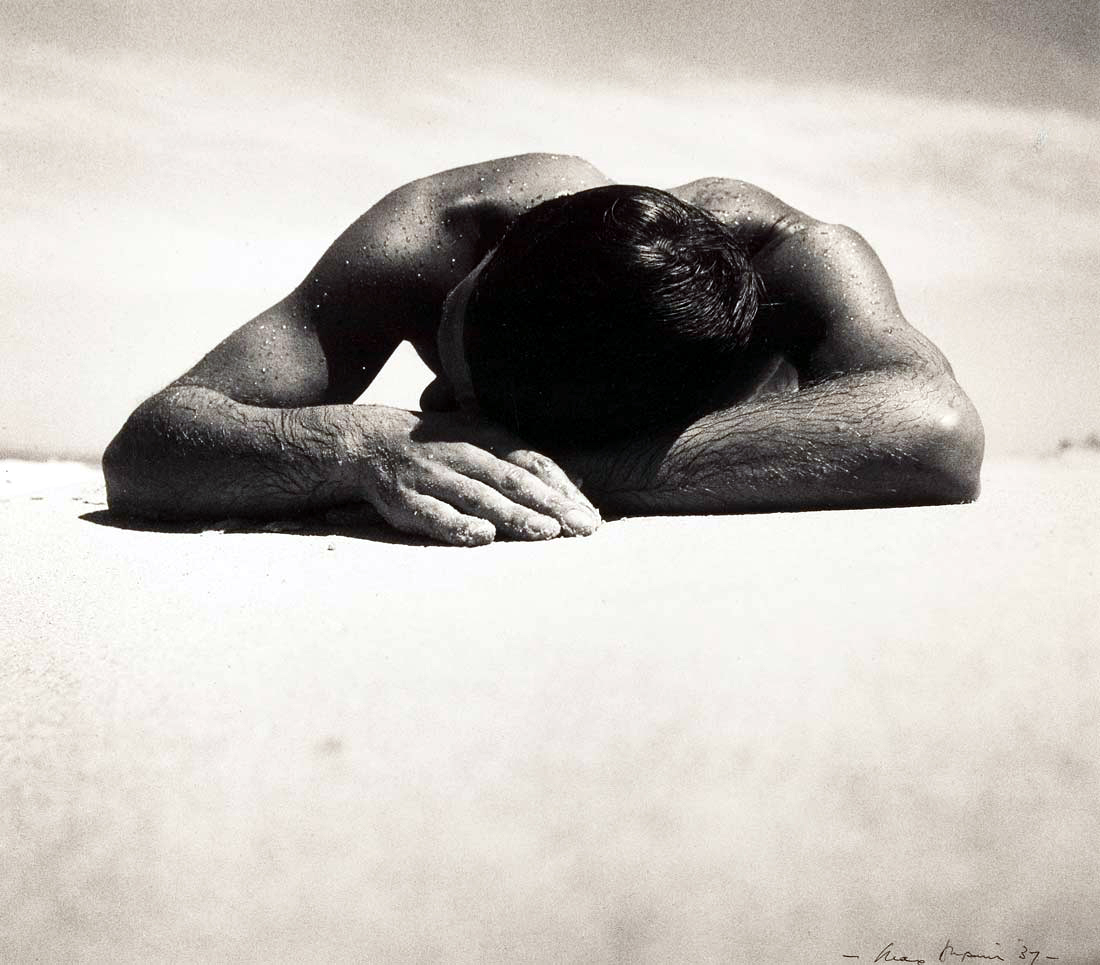
Sunbaker (1937), an iconic photograph by Max Dupain

Aboriginal rock art is the oldest continuous art tradition in the world, dating as far back as 60,000 years. From the Gwion Gwion and Wondjina imagery in the Kimberley to the Sydney rock engravings, it is spread across hundreds of thousands of sites, making Australia the richest continent in terms of prehistoric art. 19th-century Indigenous activist William Barak painted ceremonial scenes, such as corroborees. The Hermannsburg School, led by Albert Namatjira, received national fame in the 1950s for their desert watercolours. Leading critic Robert Hughes saw contemporary Indigenous art as "the last great art movement of the 20th century". Key exponents such as Emily Kame Kngwarreye, Rover Thomas and the Papunya Tula group use acrylic paints on canvas to depict dreamings set in a symbolic topography. Clifford Possum Tjapaltjarri's Warlugulong (1977) typifies this style, popularly known as "dot painting". Art is important both culturally and economically to Indigenous society; central Australian Indigenous communities have "the highest per capita concentrations of artists anywhere in the world". Issues of race and identity are raised in the works of many 'urban' Indigenous artists, including Gordon Bennett and Tracey Moffatt.

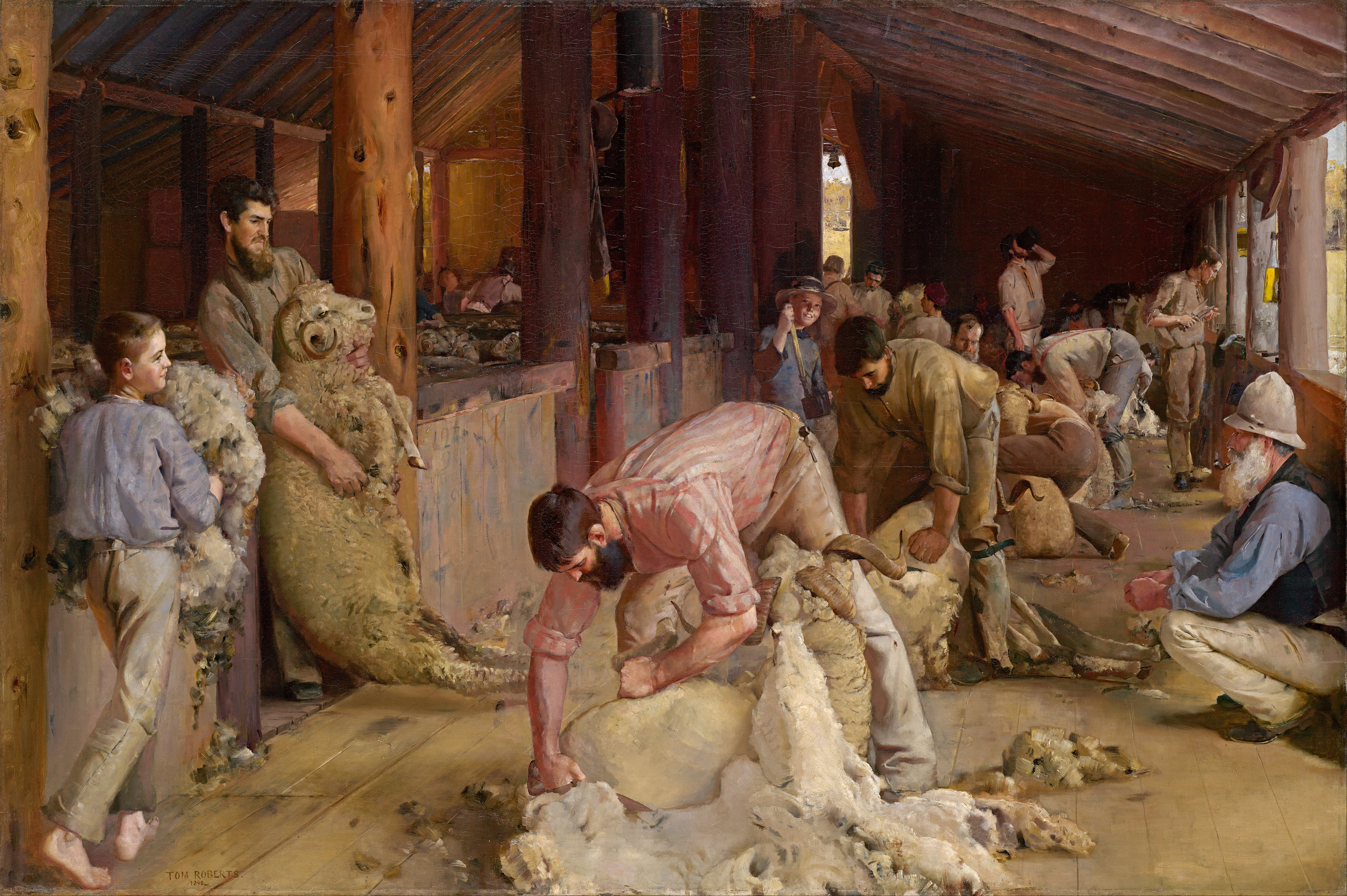
Shearing the Rams (1890) by Heidelberg School artist Tom Roberts

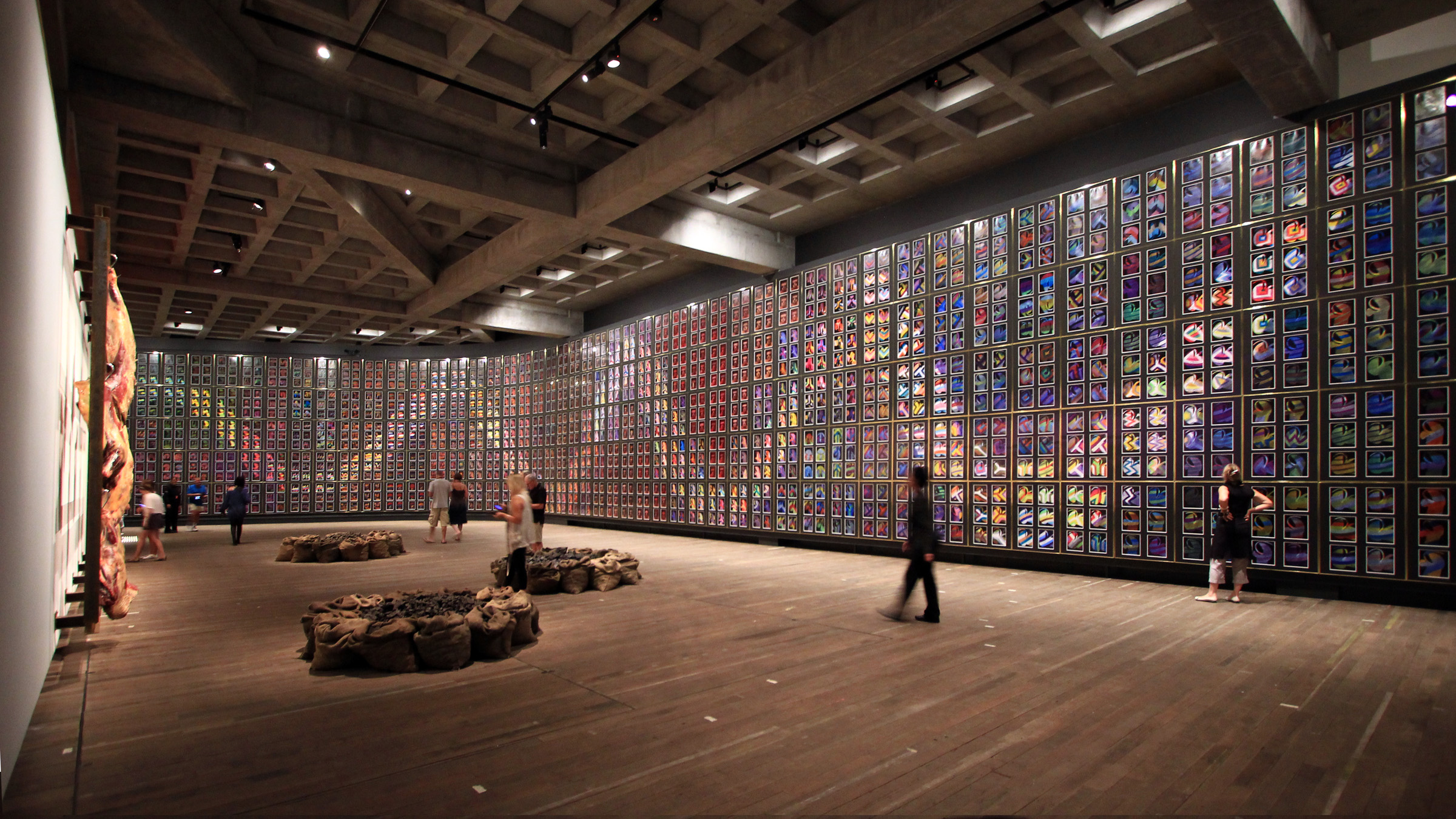
Sidney Nolan's Snake (1972), held at the Museum of Old and New Art

John Glover and Eugene von Guerard were among the foremost landscape painters during the colonial era. The origins of a distinctly Australian school of painting is often associated with the Heidelberg School of the late 1800s. Major figures of the movement include Tom Roberts, Arthur Streeton and Frederick McCubbin. They painted en plein air, like the French Impressionists, and sought to capture the intense light and unique colours of the Australian bush. Popular works such as McCubbin's Down on His Luck (1889) and Roberts' Shearing the Rams (1890) defined an emerging sense of national identity in the lead-up to Federation. Civic monuments to national heroes were erected; an early example is Charles Summers' 1865 statue of the ill-fated explorers Burke and Wills, located in Melbourne.

Among the first Australian artists to gain a reputation overseas was the impressionist John Peter Russell in the 1880s. He and Charles Conder of the Heidelberg School were the only Australian painters known to have close links with the European avant-garde at the time. Other notable expatriates include Rupert Bunny, a salon painter of sensual portraits, and sculptor Bertram Mackennal, known for his commissioned works in Australia and abroad.

The Heidelberg tradition lived on in Hans Heysen's imagery of gum trees. Roy de Maistre and Grace Cossington Smith were pioneers of modernism in Australia. Jessie Traill and Margaret Preston excelled at printmaking; the latter artist advocated for a modern national art based on Aboriginal designs. The conservative art establishment largely opposed modern art, as did the Lindsays and Australian Tonalists. Controversy over modern art in Australia reached a climax when William Dobell won the 1943 Archibald Prize for portraiture. Despite such opposition, new artistic trends grew in popularity. Photographer Max Dupain created bold modernist compositions of Sydney beach culture. Sidney Nolan, Arthur Boyd, Joy Hester and Albert Tucker were members of the Angry Penguins, a group of expressionists who revived Australian landscape painting through the use of myth, folklore and personal symbolism. The use of surrealism allowed artists to evoke the strange disquiet of the outback, exemplified in Nolan's iconic Ned Kelly series and Russell Drysdale's The Cricketers (1948). The post-war landscapes of Fred Williams, Ian Fairweather and John Olsen border on abstraction, while the Antipodeans and Brett Whiteley further explored the possibilities of figurative painting.

Photographer Bill Henson, sculptor Ron Mueck, and "living art exhibit" Leigh Bowery are among Australia's best-known contemporary artists. Pro Hart's output of Australiana, Michael Leunig's poetic cartoons, and Ken Done's Sydney Harbour views are widely known through reproductions. Public artworks have sprung up in unlikely places, from the annual Sculpture by the Sea exhibitions to the rural folk art of "Australia's big things". Australian street art flourished at the turn of the 21st century, particularly in Melbourne.

Major arts institutions in Australia include the National Gallery of Victoria in Melbourne, the National Gallery of Australia, National Museum of Australia and National Portrait Gallery in Canberra, and the Art Gallery of New South Wales in Sydney. The Museum of Old and New Art in Hobart is the Southern Hemisphere's largest private museum.

=== Cinema ===
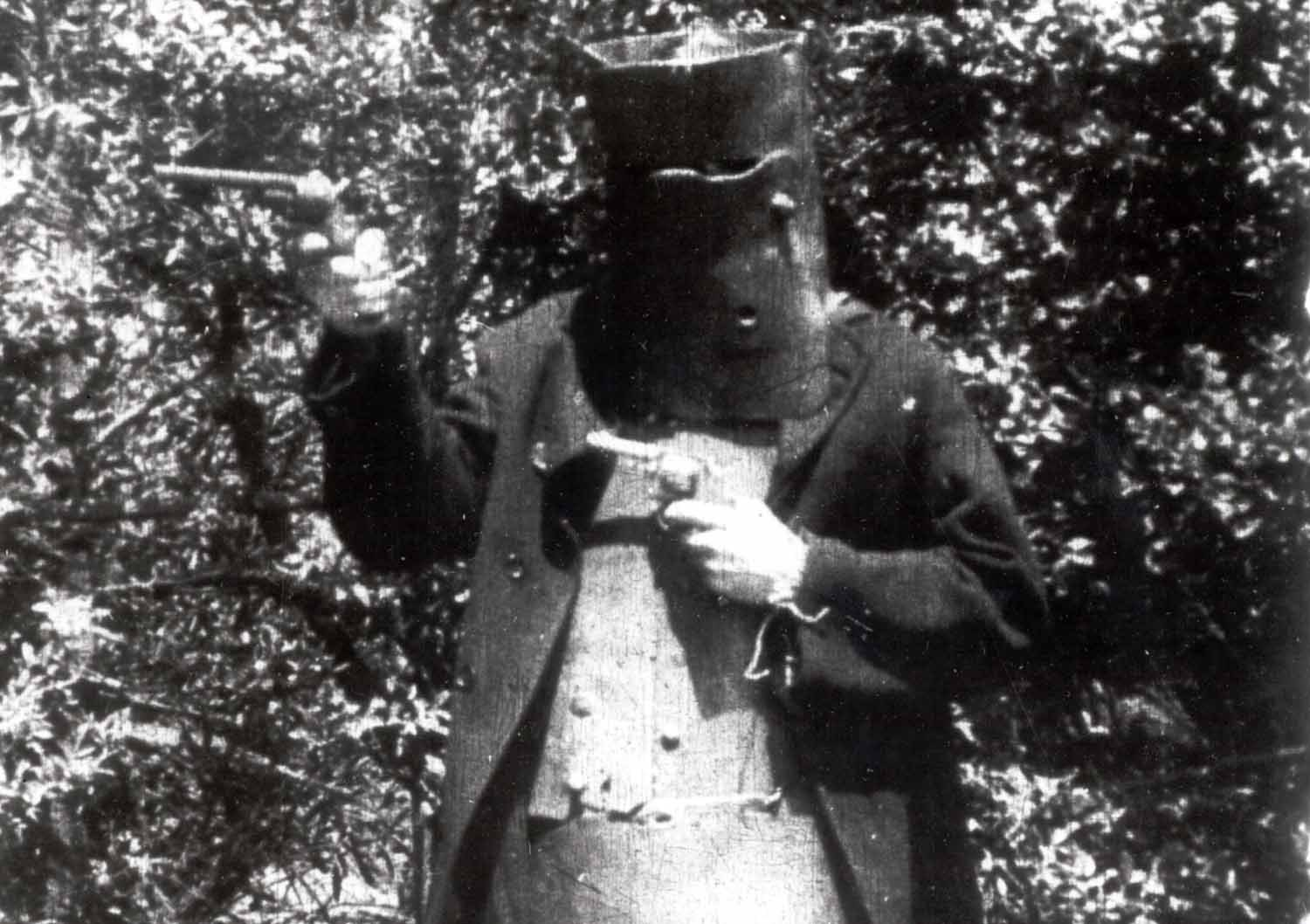
Actor playing the bushranger Ned Kelly in The Story of the Kelly Gang (1906), the world's first feature film

Australia's first dedicated film studio, the Limelight Department, was created by The Salvation Army in Melbourne in 1898, and is believed to be the world's first. The world's first feature-length film was the 1906 Australian production The Story of the Kelly Gang. Tales of bushranging, gold mining, convict life and the colonial frontier dominated the silent film era of Australian cinema. Filmmakers such as Raymond Longford and W. J. Lincoln based many of their productions on Australian novels, plays, and even paintings. An enduring classic is Longford and Lottie Lyell's 1919 film The Sentimental Bloke, adapted from the 1915 poems by C. J. Dennis. After such early successes, Australian cinema suffered from the rise of Hollywood.

In 1933, In the Wake of the Bounty was directed by Charles Chauvel, who cast Errol Flynn as the leading actor. Flynn went on to a celebrated career in Hollywood. Chauvel directed a number of successful Australian films, the last being 1955's Jedda, which was notable for being the first Australian film to be shot in colour, and the first to feature Aboriginal actors in lead roles and to be entered at the Cannes Film Festival. It was not until 2006 and Rolf de Heer's Ten Canoes that a major feature-length drama was shot in an Indigenous language (Yolngu).

Ken G. Hall's 1942 documentary feature Kokoda Front Line! was the first Australian film to win an Academy Award. In 1976, Peter Finch posthumously became the first Australian actor to win an Oscar for his role in Network.

During the late 1960s and 1970s an influx of government funding saw the development of a new generation of filmmakers telling distinctively Australian stories, including directors Peter Weir, George Miller and Bruce Beresford. This era became known as the Australian New Wave. Films such as Wake in Fright, Walkabout and Picnic at Hanging Rock had an immediate international impact. These successes were followed in the 1980s with the historical epic Gallipoli, the romantic drama The Man From Snowy River, the comedy "Crocodile" Dundee, and the post-apocalyptic Mad Max series.

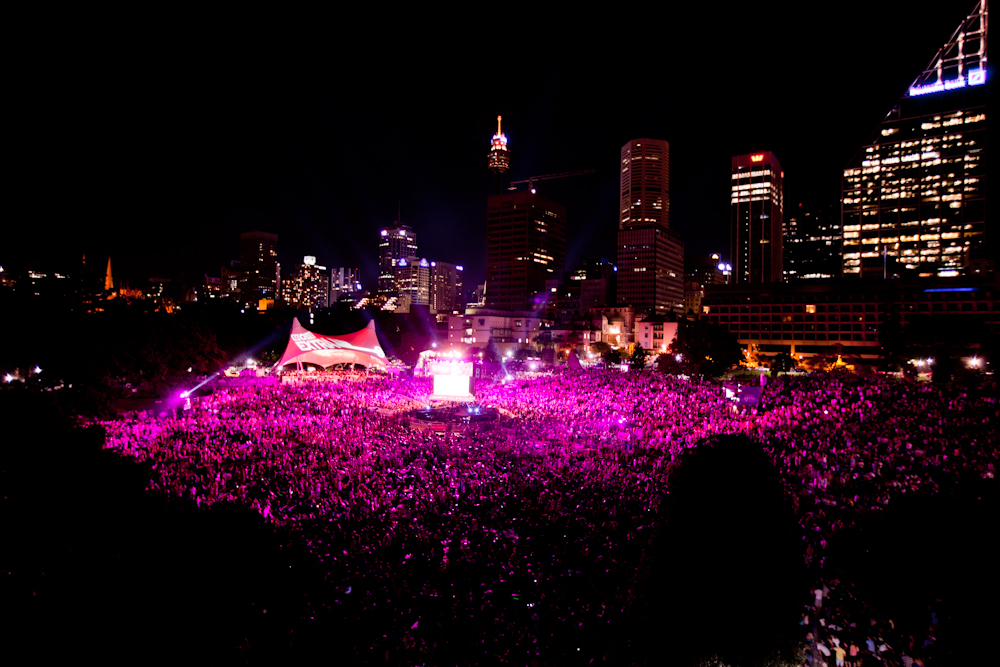
Founded in 1993, Sydney's Tropfest is the world's largest short film festival.

The 1990s saw a run of successful comedies including Muriel's Wedding and Strictly Ballroom, which helped launch the careers of Toni Collette and Baz Luhrmann respectively. Australian humour features prominently in Australian film, with a strong tradition of self-mockery, from the Ozploitation style of the Barry McKenzie expat-in-Europe movies of the 1970s, to the Working Dog Productions' 1997 homage to suburbia The Castle, starring Eric Bana in his debut film role. Comedies like the barn yard animation Babe (1995), directed by Chris Noonan; Rob Sitch's The Dish (2000); and Stephan Elliott's The Adventures of Priscilla, Queen of the Desert (1994) all feature in the top ten box-office list. During the 1990s, a new crop of Australian stars were successful in Hollywood, including Russell Crowe, Cate Blanchett and Heath Ledger. Between 1996 and 2013, Catherine Martin won four Academy Awards for her costume and production designs, the most for any Australian. Saw (2004) and Wolf Creek (2005) are credited with the revival of Australian horror. The comedic, exploitative nature and "gimmicky" style of 1970s Ozploitation films waned in the mid to late 1980s, as social realist dramas such as Romper Stomper (1992), Lantana (2001) and Samson and Delilah (2009) became more reflective of the Australian experience in the 1980s, 90s and 2000s.

The domestic film industry is also supported by US producers who produce in Australia following the decision by Fox head Rupert Murdoch to utilise new studios in Melbourne and Sydney where filming could be completed well below US costs. Notable productions include The Matrix, Star Wars episodes II and III, and Australia starring Nicole Kidman and Hugh Jackman.

=== Music ===
==== Indigenous music ====
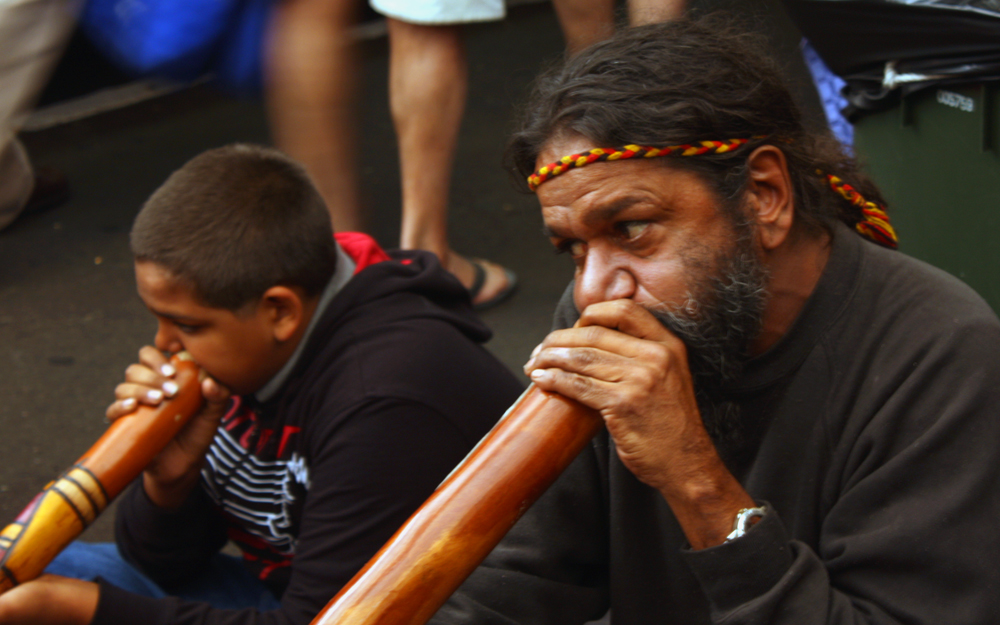
Didgeridoo performers

Music is an integral part of Aboriginal culture as a way of passing ancestral knowledge, cultural values and wisdom through generations. The most famous feature of their music is the didgeridoo, considered the "national instrument of Australia". This wooden instrument, used among the Aboriginal tribes of northern Australia, makes a distinctive droning sound and it has been adopted by a wide variety of non-Aboriginal performers.

Since the 1980s, Indigenous music has experienced a "cultural renaissance", turning to Western popular musical forms and "demand[ing] a space within the Australian arts industry". Pioneers include Lionel Rose and Jimmy Little, while notable contemporary examples include Archie Roach, Kev Carmody, the Warumpi Band, Troy Cassar-Daley and Yothu Yindi. Geoffrey Gurrumul Yunupingu (formerly of Yothu Yindi) has attained international success singing contemporary music in English and in the language of the Yolngu. Christine Anu is a successful Torres Strait Islander singer. Among young Australian aborigines, African-American and Aboriginal hip hop music and clothing is popular.

The Deadly Awards are an annual celebration of Aboriginal and Torres Strait Islander achievement in music, sport, entertainment and community.

==== Folk music and national songs ====
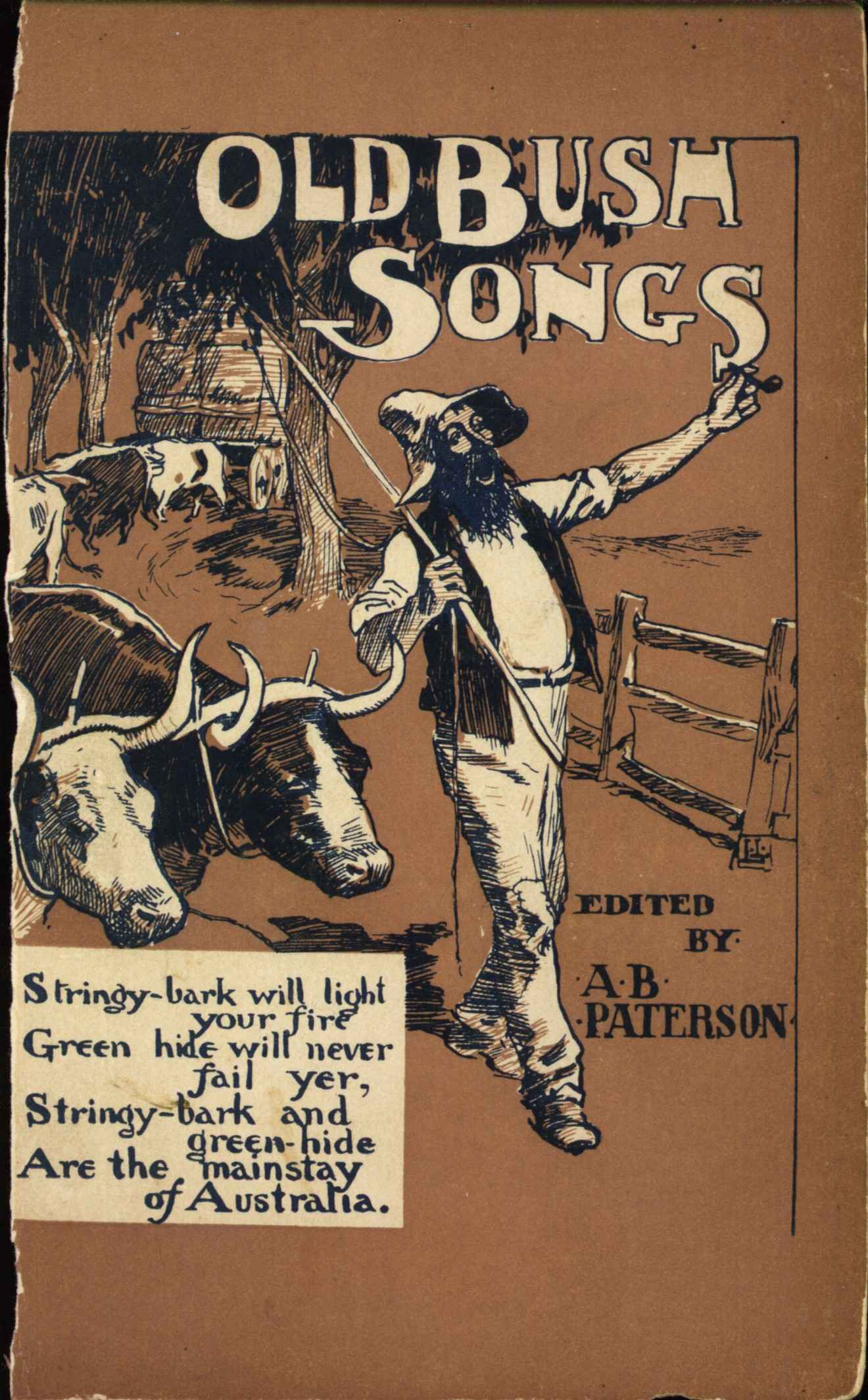
Cover of Old Bush Songs, Banjo Paterson's 1905 collection of bush ballads

The national anthem of Australia is "Advance Australia Fair".

The early Anglo-Celtic immigrants of the 18th and 19th centuries introduced folk ballad traditions which were adapted to Australian themes: "Bound for Botany Bay" tells of the voyage of British convicts to Sydney, "The Wild Colonial Boy" evokes the spirit of the bushrangers, and "Click Go the Shears" speaks of the life of Australian shearers. The lyrics of Australia's best-known folk song, "Waltzing Matilda", were written by the bush poet Banjo Paterson in 1895. This song remains popular and is regarded as "the nation's unofficial national anthem".

Well-known singers of Australian folk music include Rolf Harris (who wrote "Tie Me Kangaroo Down Sport"), John Williamson, and Eric Bogle whose 1972 anti-war ballad "And the Band Played Waltzing Matilda" is a criticism of Australian involvements in Gallipolli and Vietnam War.

==== Classical music ====
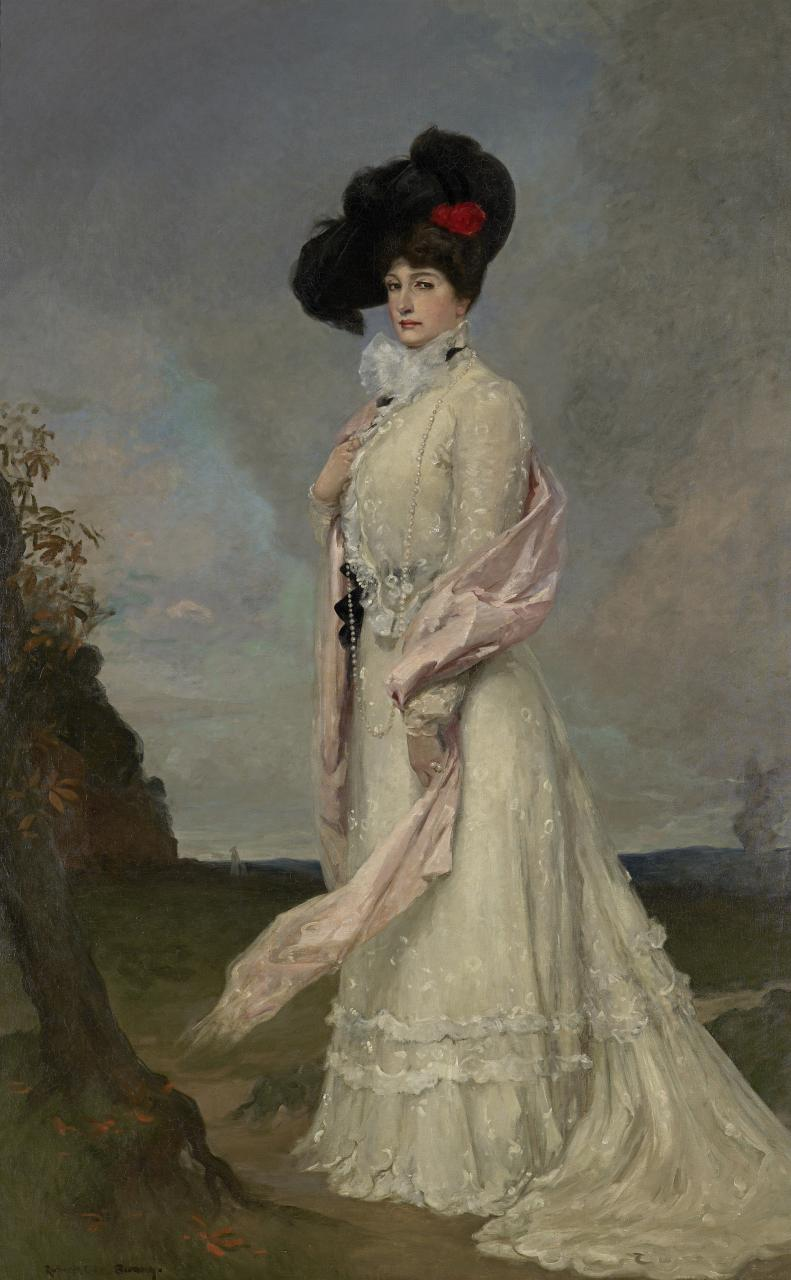
Portrait of Madame Melba by Rupert Bunny

The earliest Western musical influences in Australia can be traced back to two distinct sources: the first free settlers who brought with them the European classical music tradition, and the large body of convicts and sailors, who brought the traditional folk music of England, Ireland, Scotland and Wales. The practicalities of building a colony mean that there is very little music extant from this early period, although some samples of music originating from Hobart and Sydney date back to the early-19th century.

Nellie Melba traveled to Europe in 1886 to commence her international career as an opera singer. She became among the best-known Australians of the period and participated in early gramophone-recording and radio-broadcasting. The establishment of choral societies (c. 1850) and of symphony orchestras (c. 1890) led to increased compositional activity, although many Australian classical composers worked entirely within European models. Popular works such as Percy Grainger's "Country Gardens" (1918) were heavily influenced by the folk music of other countries and by a conservative British orchestral tradition.

In the mid 20th century, as the desire to express a uniquely Australian identity in music developed, composers such as John Antill and Peter Sculthorpe drew influences from nature and Aboriginal culture, and Richard Meale turned to south-east Asian music. Nigel Butterley combined his penchant for international modernism with his own individual voice.

At the beginning of the 1960s Australian classical music erupted with influences, with composers incorporating disparate elements into their work, ranging from Aboriginal and Southeast Asian music and instruments, to American jazz and blues, and belatedly discovering European atonality and the avant-garde. Composers like Don Banks (1923–1980), Don Kay, Malcolm Williamson and Colin Brumby (1933–2018) epitomise this period. Since the 1990s composers including Liza Lim, Nigel Westlake, Ross Edwards, Graeme Koehne, Julian Cochran, Georges Lentz, Elena Kats-Chernin, Richard Mills, Brett Dean and Carl Vine have embodied the pinnacle of established Australian composers.

Well-known Australian classical performers include: sopranos Dame Joan Sutherland, Dame Joan Hammond, Joan Carden, Yvonne Kenny, and Emma Matthews; pianists Roger Woodward, Eileen Joyce, Geoffrey Tozer, Leslie Howard and Ian Munro; guitarists John Williams and Slava Grigoryan; horn player Barry Tuckwell; oboist Diana Doherty; violinists Richard Tognetti and Elizabeth Wallfisch; cellist David Pereira; orchestras including the Sydney Symphony Orchestra, the Melbourne Symphony Orchestra, the Australian Chamber Orchestra and the Australian Brandenburg Orchestra; and conductors Sir Charles Mackerras, and Simone Young. Indigenous performers like didgeridoo-player William Barton and immigrant musicians like Egyptian-born oud virtuoso Joseph Tawadros have stimulated interest in their own music traditions and have also collaborated with other musicians and ensembles, both in Australia and internationally.

==== Popular music ====
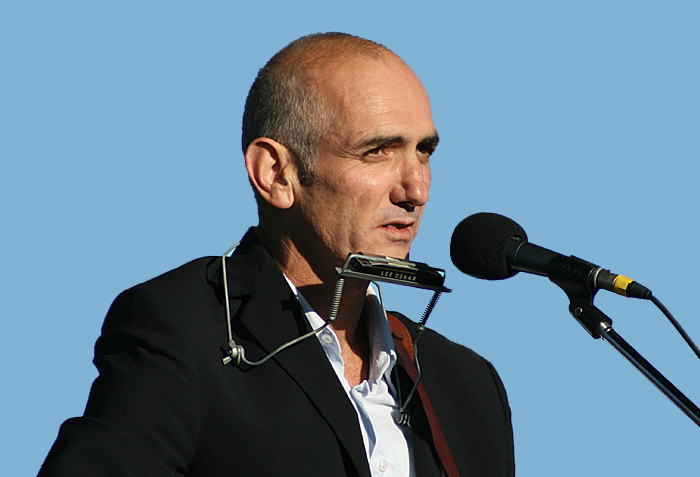
Singer-songwriter Paul Kelly

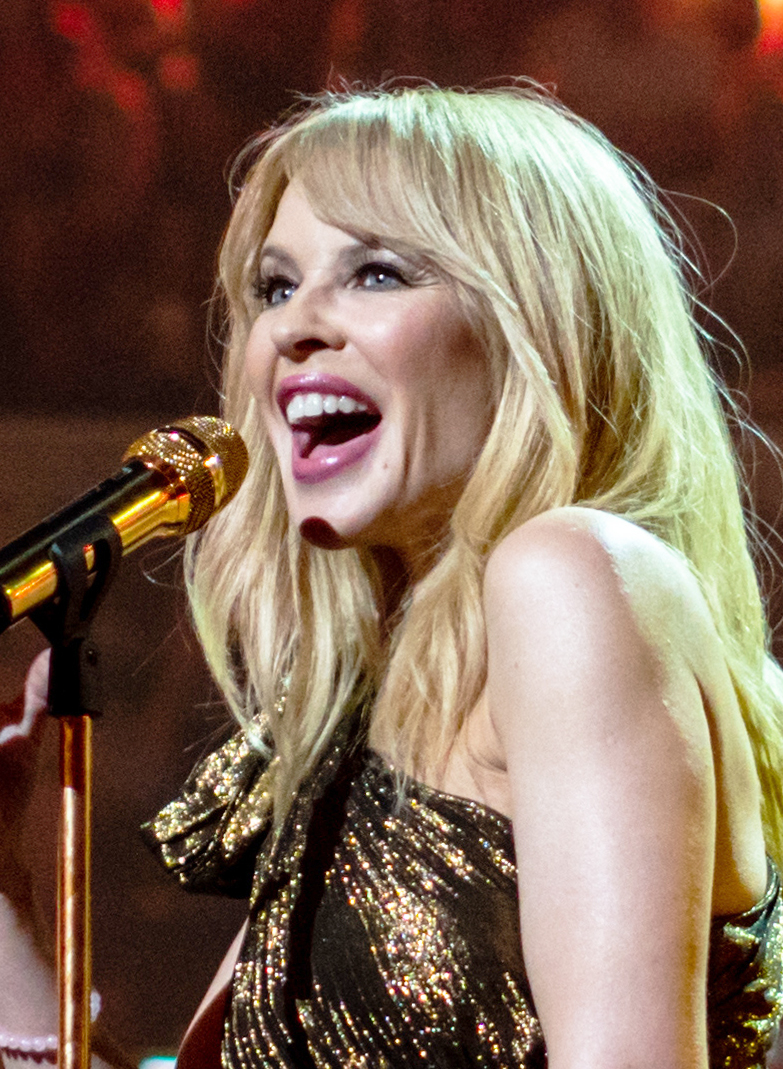
Kylie Minogue, one of Australia's most successful pop musicians

Johnny O'Keefe became the first Australian rock and roll artist to reach the national charts with his 1958 hit "Wild One". While American and British content dominated airwaves and record sales into the 1960s, local successes began to emerge, notably The Easybeats and The Seekers. From the 1970s onwards, pub rock, which grew out of the Australian pub scene, began to gain prominence and established home-grown bands, "whose lyrics were locally specific and about issues that everyday Australians could relate to". In this context, the Bee Gees and AC/DC rose to prominence in Australia before going on to international success. Australian performers continued to do well at a local and international level into the 1980s, for example Cold Chisel, INXS, Nick Cave, Crowded House, Midnight Oil and Little River Band. Held since 1987, the ARIAs are Australia's premier music awards. Silverchair, Powderfinger, AC/DC, John Farnham, Jimmy Barnes, the Bee Gees, Savage Garden, Tina Arena, Vanessa Amorosi and Kylie Minogue are among the most successful artists in the awards' history. Singer-songwriter Paul Kelly, whose music style straddles folk, rock, and country, has been described as the poet laureate of Australian music. Spurred in part by the national expansion of ABC youth radio station Triple J, a string of successful alternative Australian acts have emerged since the 1990s, including You Am I, Gotye, Sia and Tame Impala.

Australian country music has developed a style quite distinct from its American counterpart, drawing more on local folklore like the Australian bushranging tradition. Pioneers of popular Australian country music include Tex Morton in the 1930s and Smoky Dawson from the 1940s onward. Known as the "King of Australian Country Music", Slim Dusty released over 100 albums in a career spanning almost six decades; his 1957 hit "A Pub With No Beer" was the first Australian single to go gold. Dusty's wife Joy McKean penned several of his most popular songs. Other notable Australian country music performers include John Williamson who wrote the iconic song "True Blue", Lee Kernaghan, Adam Brand and Kasey Chambers. Olivia Newton-John and Keith Urban have attained success in the United States. The Tamworth Country Music Festival is held annually in Tamworth, the "Country Music Capital of Australia". During the festival the Country Music Association of Australia holds the Country Music Awards of Australia ceremony awarding the Golden Guitar trophies.

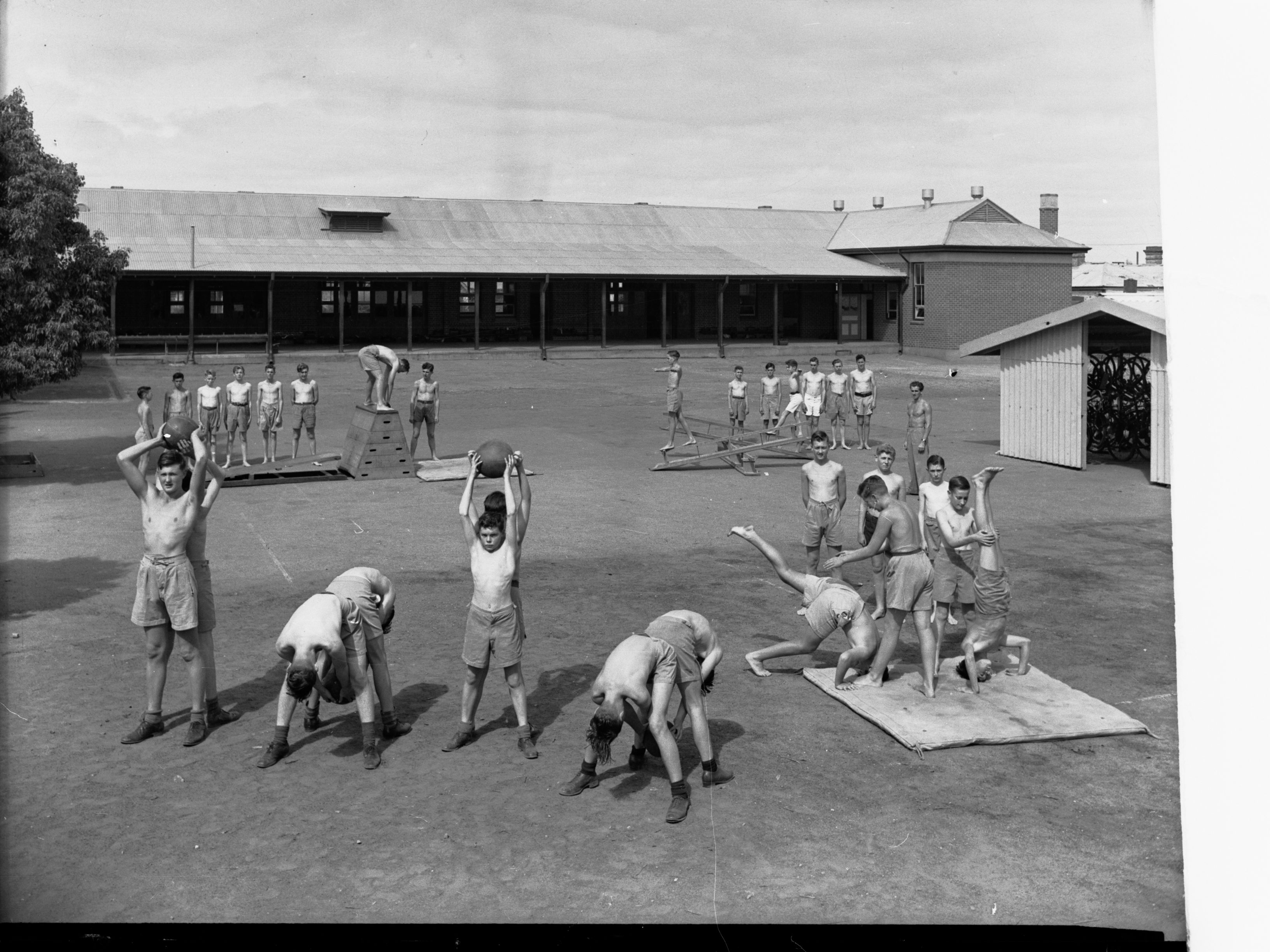
Calisthenics class at the Goodwood Boys Technical School, 1945

Traditional Australian Calisthenics is a distinctly Australian, competitive performing art and dance-sport that came to prominence during the Victorian gold rush. Independent from global bodyweight strength training, the discipline originally arose as a health and fitness initiative for urban populations, incorporating hand-held apparatus like wooden rods and Indian clubs to improve joint flexibility and physical coordination. Organized public classes began in the 1880s, and by 1903, the art form was formalized as a competitive stage event at the prestigious Royal South Street Society Eisteddfod in Ballarat. The movement gained a strong musical and artistic focus over time, leading to its inclusion in the Victorian state school curriculum during the 1930s before expanding into a nationwide performance sport as instructors migrated across the country. Today, Traditional Australian Calisthenics is a team-based stage discipline performed in a synchronized eisteddfod style, fusing elements of dance, ballet, and gymnastics with theatrical storytelling, musical interpretation ("aesthetics"), and synchronized apparatus manipulation.

=== Television ===
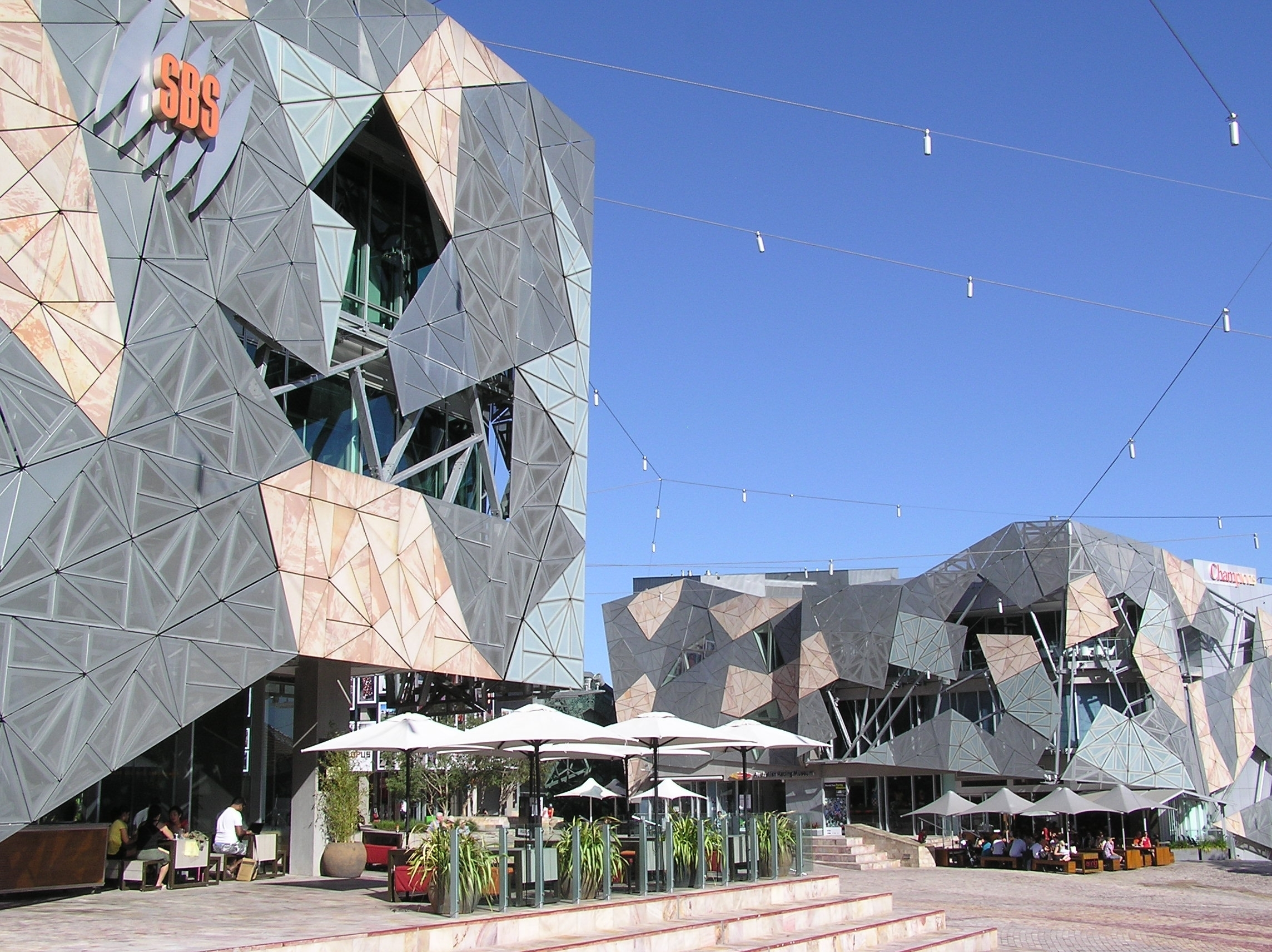
The SBS building in Melbourne's Federation Square. SBS is Australia's multicultural broadcaster.

Experiments with television began in Australia in the 1930s and television was officially launched on 16 September 1956 in Sydney. Colour TV arrived in 1975. The Logie Awards are the major annual awards for Australian TV.

While US and British television is popular in Australia, locally produced content has had many successes. Successful local product has included Homicide and Division 4 in the late 1960s and early 1970s, Play School and Skippy the Bush Kangaroo in the late 1960s, Matlock Police, The Sullivans, The Young Doctors, Number 96 and The Box in the 1970s, The Flying Doctors, Round the Twist, Prisoner and A Country Practice (1981–1993) in the 1980s, Blue Heelers, Neighbours and Home and Away in the 1980s and 1990s and Summer Heights High and H_{2}O: Just Add Water in the 2000s. Since then shows like Packed to the Rafters, SeaChange and Wentworth have continued to help redefine Australian television. Many of the shows from the mid-1980s onwards have been exported and have sometimes been even more successful abroad, such as Steve Irwin's The Crocodile Hunter. Popular stars of Australian TV have included: the pioneer variety show hosts Graham Kennedy, Bert Newton, Don Lane and Daryl Somers, and contemporary talk show hosts Mike Willesee, Steve Vizard, Ray Martin, Mike Munro, Andrew Denton and Rove McManus. Popular international exports include the Bee Gees, Dame Edna Everage, Sir Les Patterson, AC/DC, The Fairies, Clive James, Geoffrey Robertson and The Wiggles. Australian Content Standard requires all free-to-air commercial networks to broadcast an annual minimum of 55% Australian content for primary channels and 1460 hours for non-primary channels between 6 a.m. and midnight.

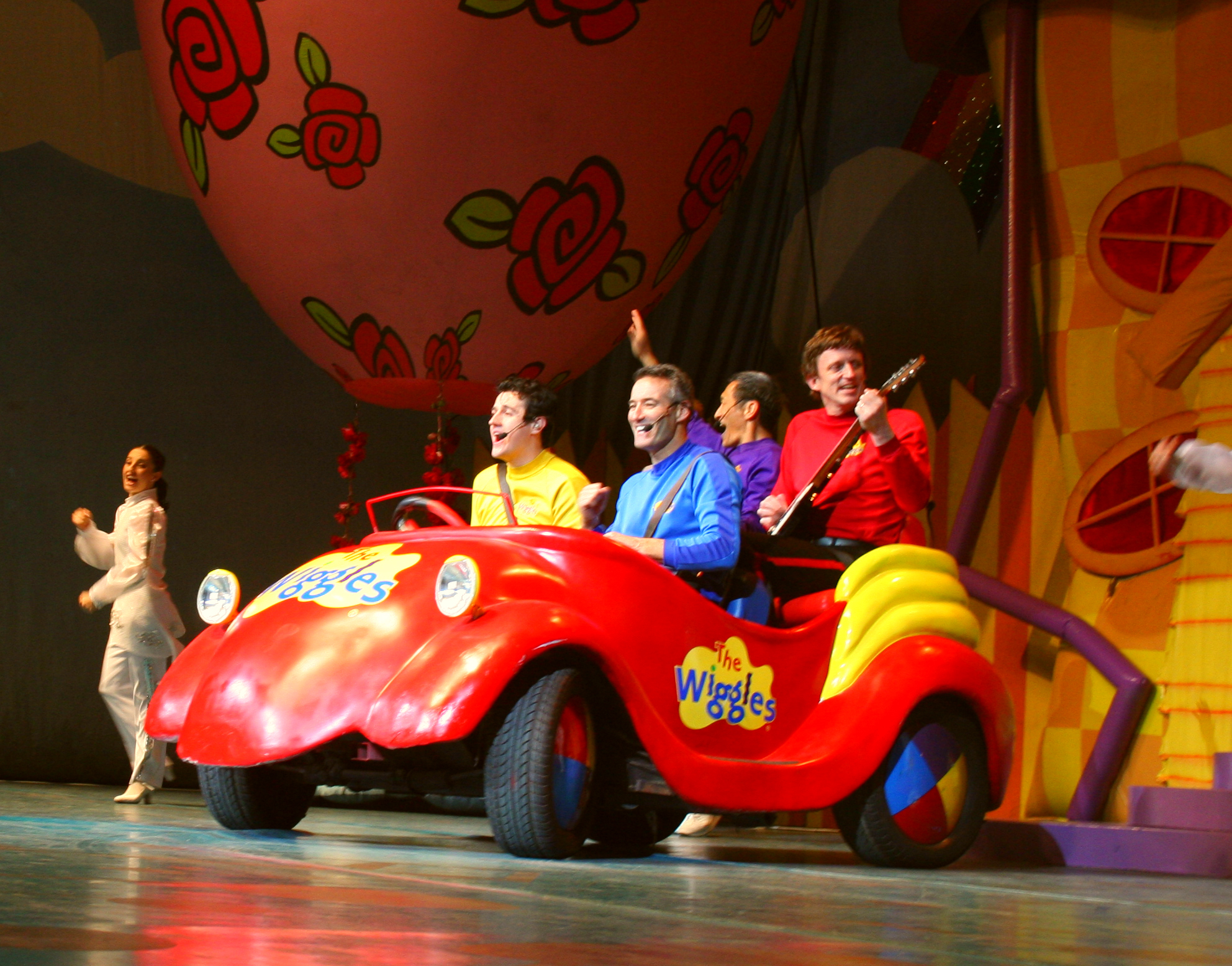
The Wiggles performing in the United States in 2007

While Australia has ubiquitous media coverage, the longest established part of that media is the Australian Broadcasting Corporation (ABC), the Federal Government owned and funded organisation offering national TV and radio coverage. The ABC, like the BBC in Britain, CBC in Canada, and PBS in the United States, is a non-commercial public service broadcaster, showing many BBC or ITV productions from Britain. The publicly funded Special Broadcasting Service (SBS) has a multicultural focus, broadcasting TV and radio programs in a variety of languages, as well as world news and documentary programming in English. SBS commenced as a commercial-free enterprise, but this changed in 2006 with the broadcasting of commercials between programs. In 2005, ABC and SBS accounted for 15.7% and 6.1% of the national ratings, respectively.

Commercial broadcasters include the Seven Network, the Nine Network and Network Ten on free-to-air broadcasting to the larger cities with affiliated regional networks like Prime Television and WIN Television broadcasting to regional areas. Foxtel, Austar and Optus Television have been the main providers of pay TV. Fox 8 and Sky News Australia are among the popular Pay TV channels. The Australia Network, established in 2001, is Australia's international television service, beaming to more than 44 countries across Asia, the Pacific and the Indian subcontinent.

The ABC has made a significant contribution to television drama with popular series like SeaChange and Brides of Christ, and to comedy with the 1970s hits Aunty Jack and The Norman Gunston Show and more recently Roy & HG, Kath & Kim and The Chaser's War on Everything. ABC status as Australia's flagship broadcaster has faced significant challenges since the 2020s such as budget cuts and declining in overall reach.

== Religion ==
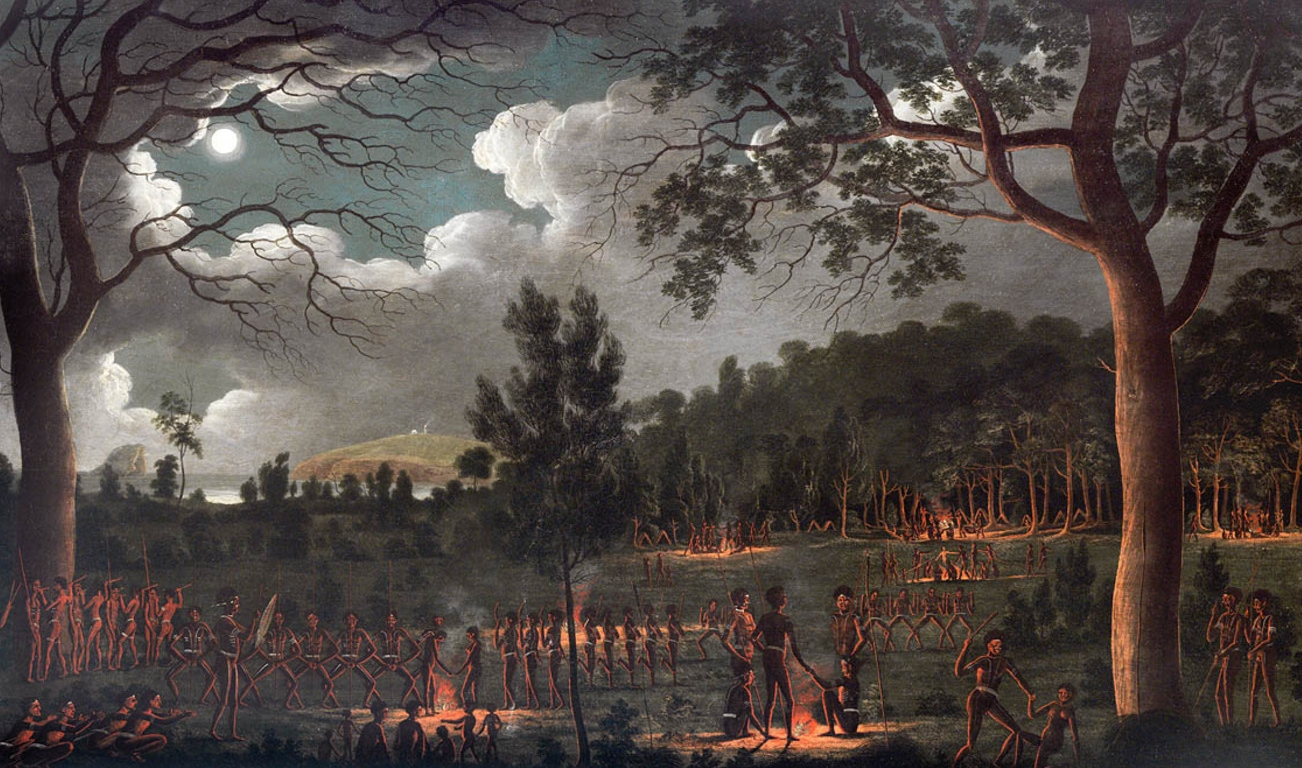
Corroboree at Newcastle by convict artist Joseph Lycett, c. 1818. Aboriginal Australian religious practices associated with the Dreamtime have been practised for tens of thousands of years.

Australia has no official state religion and the Australian Constitution prohibits the Commonwealth government from establishing a church or interfering with the freedom of religion. According to the 2021 Australian Census, 43.9% of Australians were listed as Christian. This percentage has declined considerably from 61.1% a decade earlier; a growing proportion of the population define themselves as irreligious, with 38.9% of Australians declaring 'No religion' in 2021, compared to 22.3% in the 2011 Census. There are also growing communities of various other religions. From the early decades after federation, people from diverse religious backgrounds have held public office. The first Jewish governor general, Isaac Isaacs, was selected by the first Catholic prime minister, James Scullin, in the 1930s. In the 21st-century, some prime ministers have identified as religious, others as non-religious.

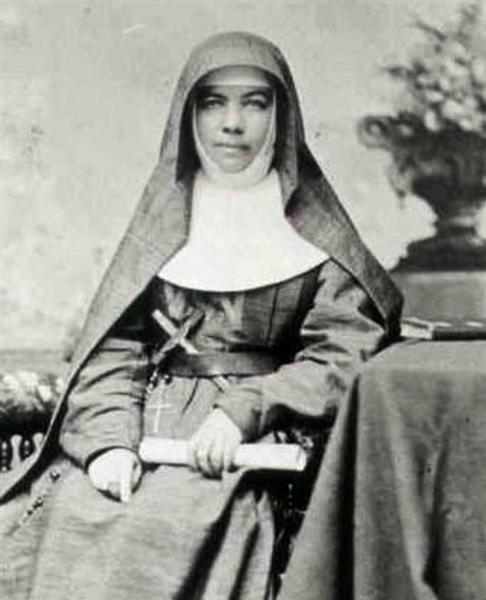
St Mary Mackillop established an extensive network of schools and is Australia's first canonised saint of the Catholic Church.

Christianity has had an enduring impact on Australia. At the time of Federation in 1901, 97% of Australians professed to be Christians. The Anglican Church (formerly Church of England) remained the largest denomination until 1986, when it was surpassed by the Roman Catholic Church. Australian Catholics were predominantly of Irish origin until post-World War II immigration brought more than a million Catholics from elsewhere in Europe. The Christian festivals of Christmas and Easter are national public holidays in Australia. Christian charitable organisations, hospitals and schools have played a prominent role in welfare and education since colonial times. In 2008, 20% of total students attended Catholic schools. Christian organisations such as the St. Vincent de Paul Society, the Salvation Army and Anglicare provide social services throughout Australia. Historically significant Christians include preachers David Unaipon, the first Aboriginal author, and the Reverend John Flynn, who founded the Royal Flying Doctor Service. Suffragette Catherine Helen Spence was not only Australia's first female political candidate, but also one of its first female preachers. Mary MacKillop, who co-founded an order of nuns in the 19th century, called the Sisters of St. Joseph, became the first Australian to be canonised as a Catholic Saint in 2010, and Sir Douglas Nicholls, a preacher and Aboriginal rights activist was the first Indigenous Australian to be appointed Governor of an Australian State.

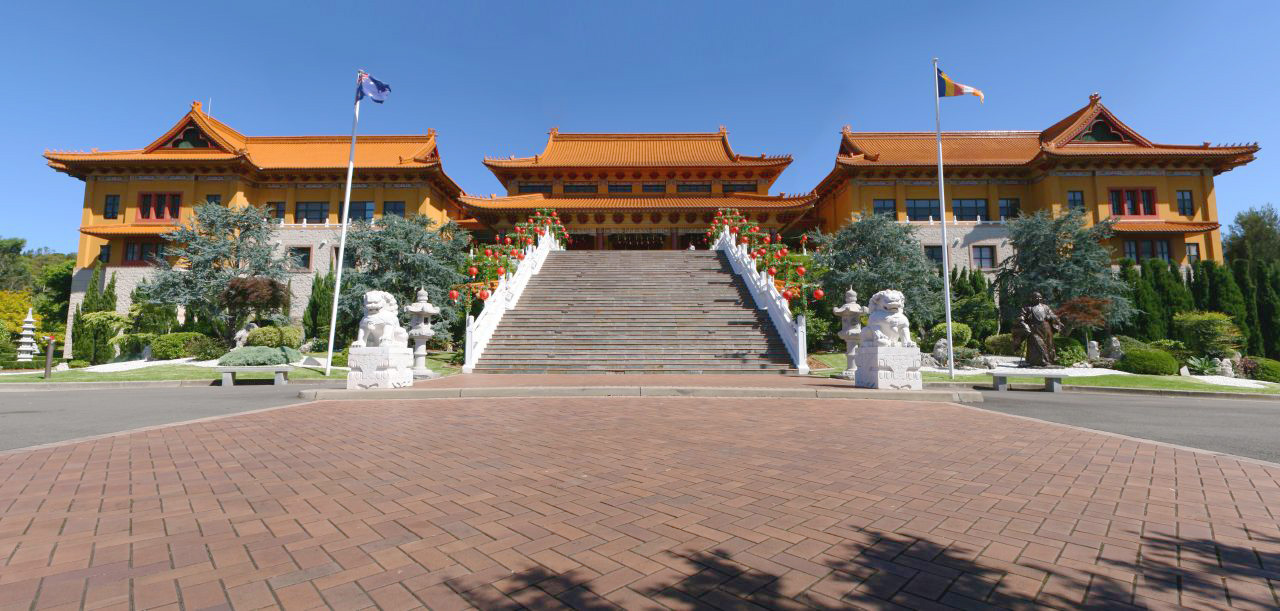
Nan Tien Temple, a Buddhist temple in Wollongong. Multicultural immigration has increased Australia's religious diversity.

According to 2021 census data published by the Australian Bureau of Statistics, the proportion of the total population who are Christian fell from 70.9% in 1996 to 43.9% in 2021, while people affiliated with other religions increased from 3.5% to 10% over the same period. The largest decrease was in adults under 25, and nearly half of Millennials stated 'No religion' while more than two-thirds of individuals aged over 75 identified as Christian. The next largest demographics (ordered by population size) are Islam, Hinduism, Buddhism, and Sikhism; since 2011, Buddhism has grown the least (dropping from largest to third), Islam has almost doubled, Hinduism more than doubled (2.48x) and Sikhism almost tripled (2.91x), becoming the fastest growing religion. Increased immigration from Southern and Central Asia has been a major factor in this growth, with 93.8% of those affiliated with Non-Christian religions either being born overseas or having at least one parent who was.

Buddhism was initially introduced around 1850 by Chinese immigrants during the Gold Rush, though numbers remained small due to a primary population of temporary workers and the immigration restrictions of the White Australia Policy. The major influx came in the 1970s with ethnic Buddhist refugees fleeing the Indochinese wars, mostly from Vietnam, but also Laos and Kampuchea (Totalitarian Cambodia under Pol Pot's Communist Dictatorship), making Buddhism the fastest growing religion until 2001. The increase since has been primarily driven by Southeast Asian, Chinese and Sri Lankan migrants, though some Australians of Anglo-Celtic origin have also shown increasing interest in Buddhism. Some Anthropologists speculate that Far-Northern Indigenous Australians may have had fleeting contact with Indonesian Hindu-Buddhist Kingdoms, due to a shared belief in reincarnation and mind-training practises; though this remains entirely unconfirmed.

Islam is the second-largest religion in Australia, having diverse communities concentrated mainly in Sydney and Melbourne and a population primarily originating from Pakistan, Afghanistan, India and Bangladesh. Muslims reached Australia before the British, with Macassan fisherman making annual expeditions to Arnhem Land and the Kimberley (Australia's North coast) to harvest trepang (sea cucumber) to sell to the Chinese. The earliest recorded voyage was in 1751, but anthropologists note the significant impact of the trepang industry on the Yolngu people, along with Arnhem Land rock art and a Sulawesi historian, all suggest evidence for contact around 1640. At the height of the trepang industry, an estimated 1,000 Macassan arrived each December with the start of the monsoon season, establishing semi-permanent camps to harvest and prepare trepang, as well as trading with the Yolngu people, before voyaging home to sell their cargo four months later. European explorers Matthew Flinders, Phillip Parker King, and Nicholas Baudin all separately encountered Macassan ships on the North and Northwestern coasts. Permanent Muslim settlement and the first Mosque began in the early 1860s with the "Afghan" Cameleers, who arrived to explore and transport across the Outback and were vital in the construction of the Overland Telegraph Line and Rabbit-proof Fence. About 3000 "Afghan" Cameleers arrived in the 1860s, mainly from modern-day India, Pakistan, and Afghanistan, along with a great number of camels, and helped open up Central Australia and supply goods to inland stations and mines. This is reflected by The Ghan, the Adelaide-Darwin Railway Service given their nickname, as well as the fact that Australia now has the largest population of feral camels in the world.

Hindus came to Australia as laborers and merchants during the 19th century, dramatically increasing from the 1960s with most coming from India or Nepal (91.9% in 2016-2021).

Sikhs almost exclusively (95.9%) arrive from India, particularly the Sikhi religious heartland Punjab.

The history of the Jews in Australia dates back to the First Fleet, which brought Jewish convicts to Sydney in 1788. Today, many Jews in Australia originated as refugees and Holocaust survivors who arrived during and after World War II.

The tradition and spirituality of Aboriginal Australians places great emphasis on the role of tribal Elders in passing down stories of the Dreaming, and skills and lessons for survival (such as hunting and tracking). The creation story and belief system of the Aboriginal tradition, known in English as the Dreamtime, reverences the land and the animals and spirits that inhabit the land and animals. European settlement introduced Indigenous Australians to Christianity, especially through "missions". There was a wide range of experiences of the missions by Aboriginal people.

== Public holidays ==
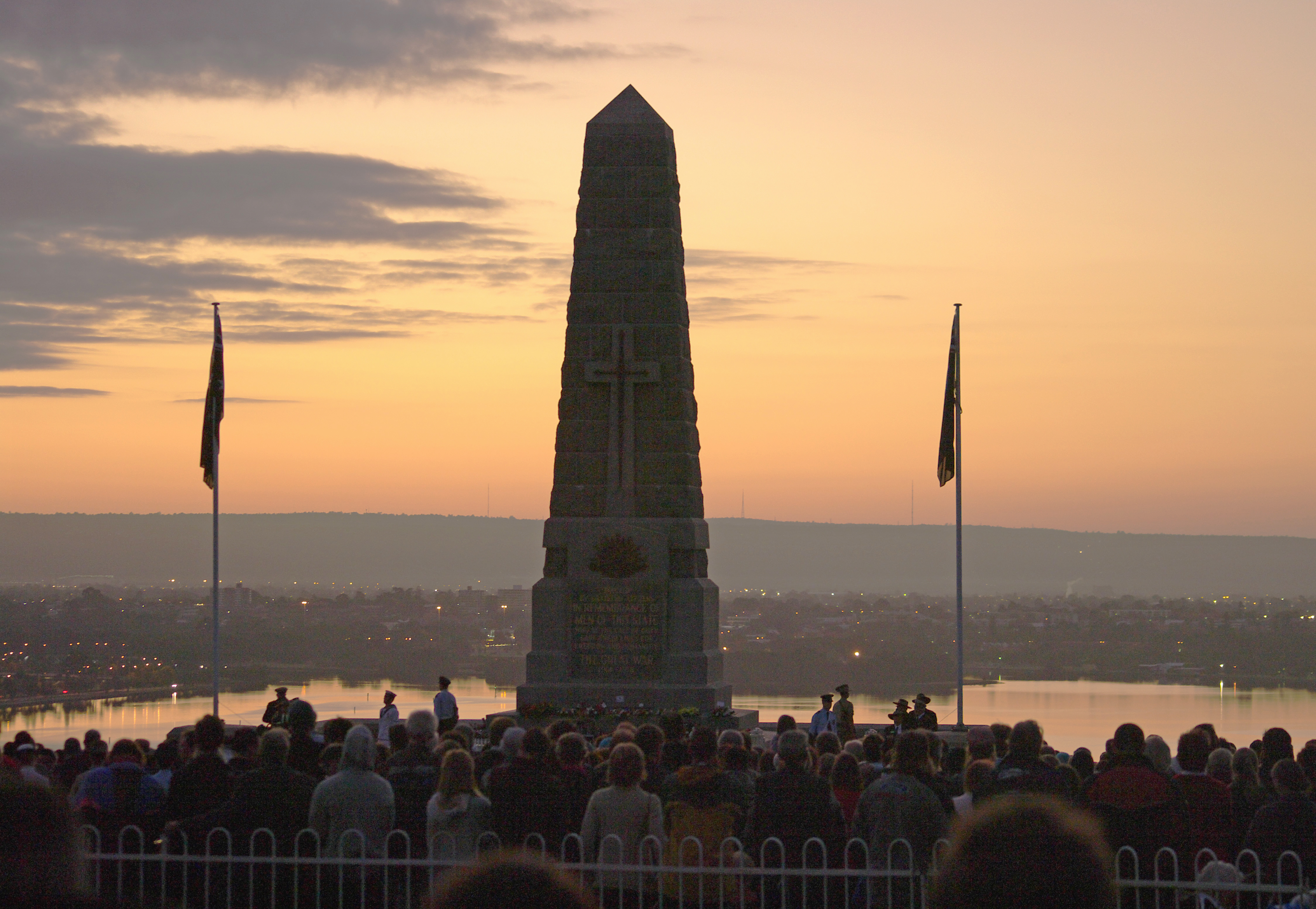
Anzac Day dawn services are held throughout Australia every April.

The national Australia Day holiday is celebrated on 26 January, the anniversary of the day First Fleet Captain Arthur Phillip first raised the Union Jack flag in Sydney Cove. That date marks the beginning of modern Australia and national awards are distributed to distinguished citizens for services to the community, as on the King's Birthday.

Also strongly associated with Australian nationhood is Anzac Day. It specifically commemorates the landing of troops in the Australian and New Zealand Army Corps (ANZAC) at Gallipoli on 25 April 1915. The day is named in their honour but more generally commemorates all Australians who have fought in wars.

The Christian festivals of Easter and Christmas are public holidays in Australia. Christmas Day, 25 December, falls during the Southern Hemisphere summer.

The King's Birthday is generally observed on the second Monday in June, except in Western Australia, where it usually is observed in September or October to distance it from Western Australia Day.

New Year's Day is celebrated and coincidentally marks the date upon which the Australian colonies officially federated in 1901.

Labor Day is also a public holiday, but on different days throughout the nation.

== Cuisine ==
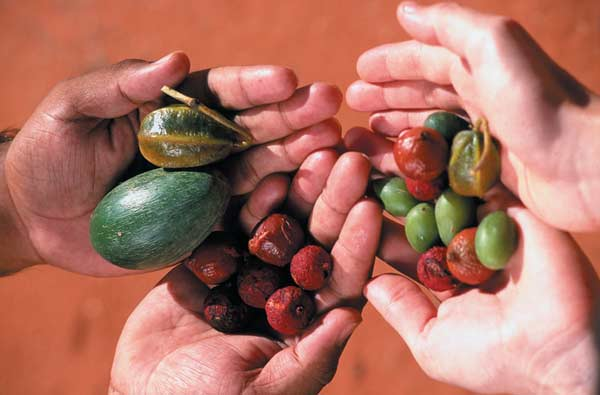
Bush tucker harvested in Alice Springs

Contemporary Australian cuisine combines British and Indigenous origins with Mediterranean and Asian influences. Australia's abundant natural resources allow access to a large variety of quality meats, and to barbecue beef or lamb in the open air is considered a cherished national tradition. The great majority of Australians live close to the sea and Australian seafood restaurants have been listed among the world's best.

Bush tucker refers to a wide variety of plant and animal foods native to the Australian bush: bush fruits such as kakadu plums, finger limes and desert quandongs; fish and shellfish of Australia's saltwater river systems; and bush meats including emu, crocodile and kangaroo. Many of these are still seasonally hunted and gathered by Indigenous Australians, and are undergoing a renaissance of interest on contemporary Australian menus. The macadamia nut is the most famous bushfood plant harvested and sold in large quantities.

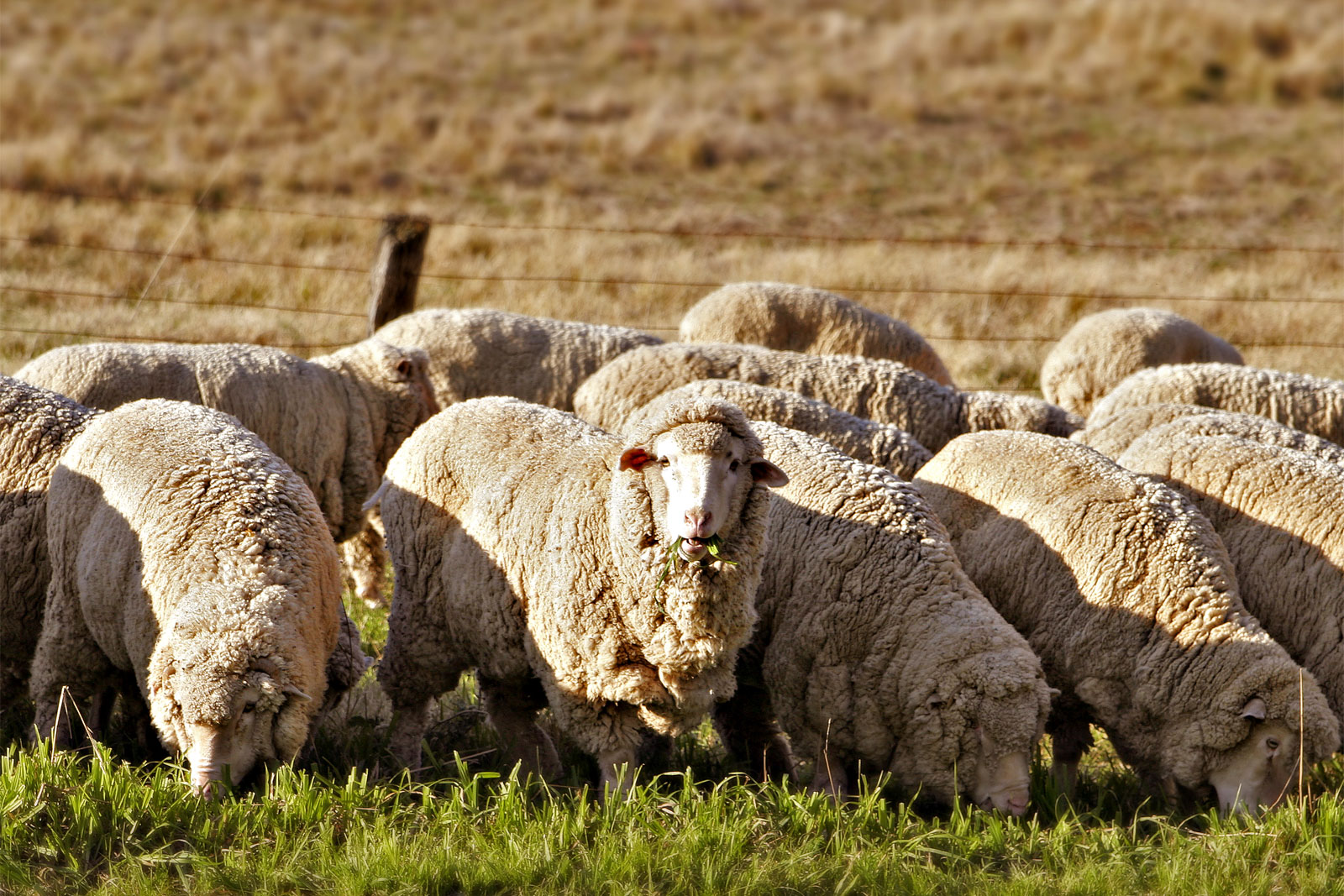
Sheep grazing in rural Australia. Early British settlers introduced Western stock and crops and Australian agriculture now produces an abundance of fresh produce.

Early British settlers brought familiar meats and crops with them from Europe and these remain important in the Australian diet. The British settlers found some familiar game – such as swan, goose, pigeon, and fish – but the new settlers often had difficulty adjusting to the prospect of native fauna as a staple diet. They established agricultural industries producing more familiar Western style produce. Queensland and New South Wales became Australia's main beef cattle producers, while dairy cattle farming is found in the southern states, predominantly in Victoria. Wheat and other grain crops are spread fairly evenly throughout the mainland states. Sugar cane is also a major crop in Queensland and New South Wales. Fruit and vegetables are grown throughout Australia. "Meat and three veg", fish and chips, and the Australian meat pie continue to represent traditional meals for many Australians. The post-World War II multicultural immigration program brought new flavours and influences, with waves of immigrants from Greece, Italy, Thailand, Vietnam, China, and elsewhere bringing about diversification and of the typical diet consumed–leading to an increasingly gastronomical culinary scene.

Australia's 11-million-square-kilometre (4.2-million-square-mile) fishing zone is the third largest in the world and allows for easy access to seafood which significantly influences Australian cuisine. Clean ocean environments produce high quality seafoods. Lobster, prawns, tuna, salmon and abalone are the main ocean species harvested commercially, while aquaculture produces more than 60 species for consumption, including oysters, salmonoids, southern bluefin tuna, mussels, prawns, barramundi, yellowtail kingfish, and freshwater finifish. While inland river and lake systems are relatively sparse, they nevertheless provide some unique fresh water game fish and crustacea suitable for dining. Fishing and aquaculture constitute Australia's fifth most valuable agricultural industry after wool, beef, wheat and dairy.

Vegemite is a well-known spread originating from Australia. Iconic Australian desserts include pavlova and lamingtons. ANZAC biscuits recall the diet of Australia's World War I soldiers at the Battle of Gallipoli.

=== Beverages ===
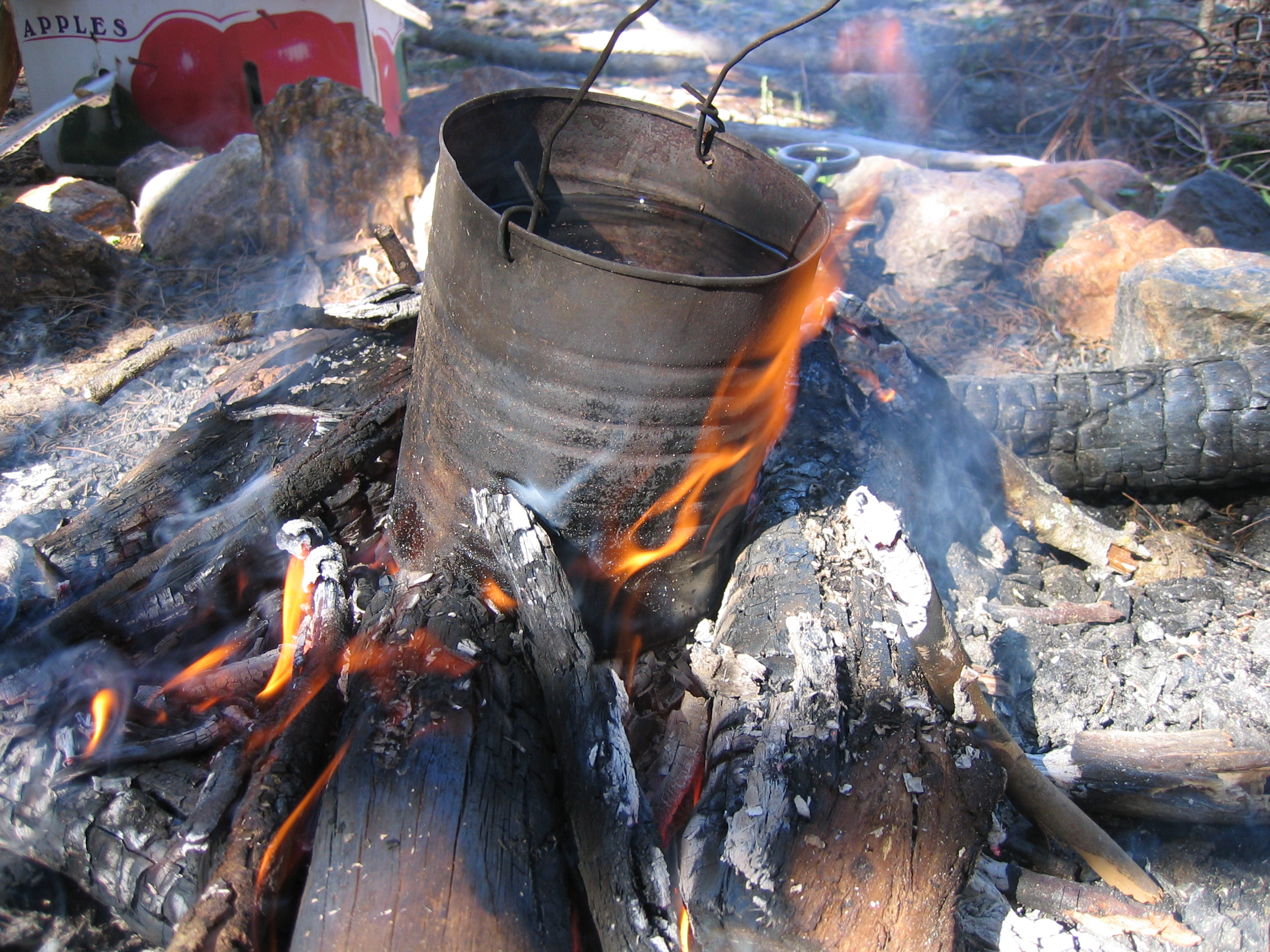
A billycan used for heating water

Australia's reputation as a nation of heavy drinkers goes back to the earliest days of colonial Sydney, when rum was used as currency and grain shortages followed the installation of the first stills. James Squires is considered to have founded Australia's first commercial brewery in 1798 and the Cascade Brewery in Hobart has been operating since 1832. Since the 1970s, Australian beers have become increasingly popular globally, with Foster's Lager being an iconic export. Foster's is not however the biggest seller on the local market, with alternatives including Carlton Draught and Victoria Bitter outselling it.

Billy tea was a staple drink of the Australian colonial period, considered to be a symbol of the bush lifestyle. It is typically boiled over a camp fire on a billy can, with a gum or lemon myrtle leaf added for flavouring.

The Australian wine industry is one of the largest exporters of wine in the world, contributing $2.2 billion to the nation's economy in 2023–24. Wine is produced in every state, however, wine regions are mainly in the southern, cooler regions. Among the most famous wine districts are the Hunter Valley and Barossa Valley and among the best known wine producers are Penfolds, Rosemount Estate, Wynns Coonawarra Estate and Lindemans. The Australian Penfolds Grange was the first wine from outside France or California to win the Wine Spectator award for Wine of the Year in 1995.

== Clothing and apparel ==
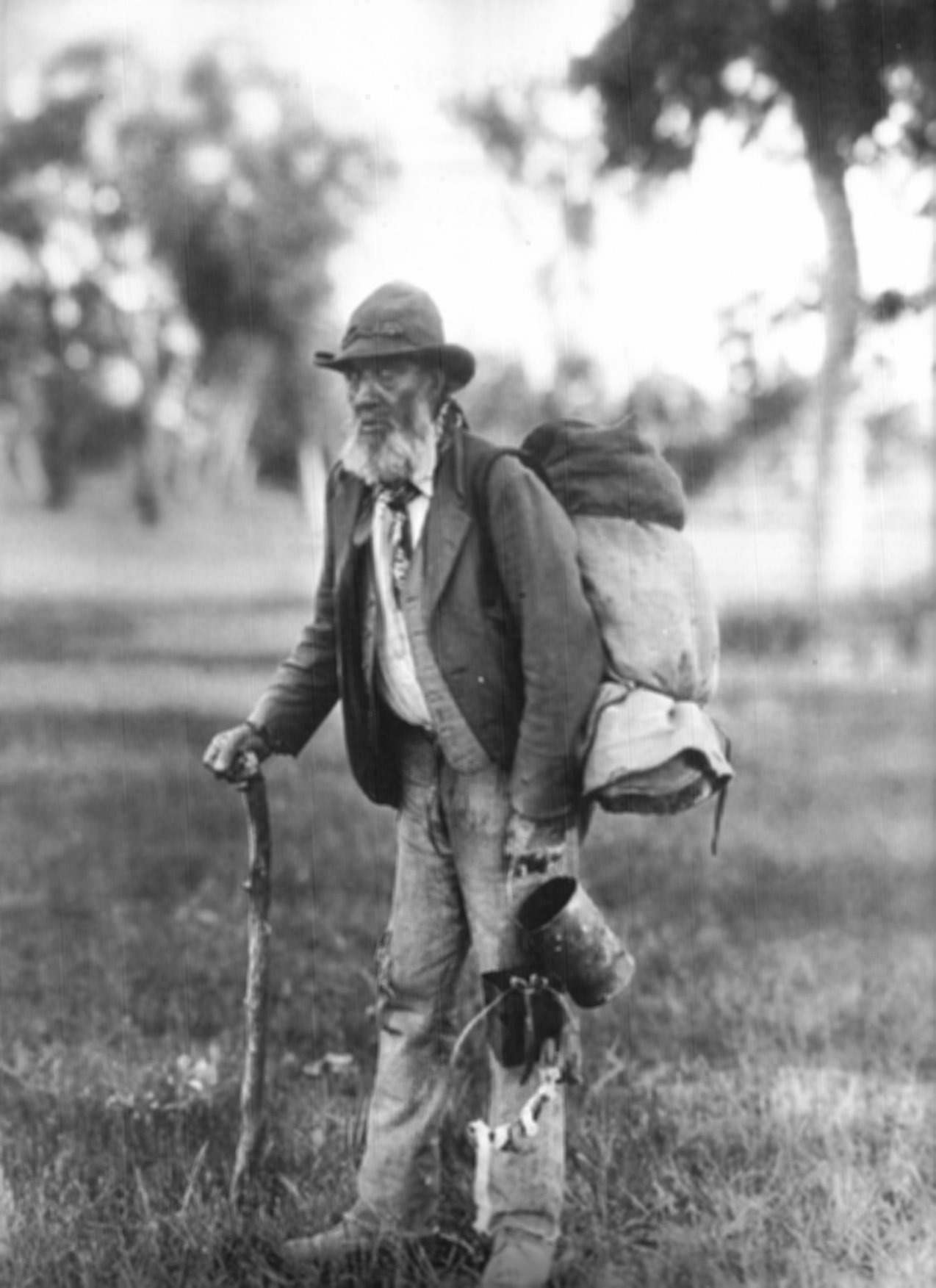
A swagman in bushman's apparel, wearing a brimmed hat and carrying swag and billy can

Australia has no official designated national dress, but iconic local styles include bushwear and surfwear. The country's best-known fashion event is Australian Fashion Week, a twice yearly industry gathering showcasing seasonal collections from Australian and Asia Pacific Designers. Top Australian models include Elle Macpherson, Miranda Kerr and Jennifer Hawkins (Miss Universe 2004).

Major clothing brands associated with bushwear are the broad brimmed Akubra hats, Driza-Bone coats and RM Williams bushmen's outfitters (featuring in particular: moleskin trousers, riding boots and merino woolwear). Blundstone Footwear and Country Road are also linked to this tradition. Made from the leaves of Livistona australis, the cabbage tree hat was the first uniquely Australian headwear, dating back to the early 1800s, and was the hat of choice for colonial-born Australians. Traditionally worn by jackaroos and swagmen in the blow-fly infested Australian outback, the cork hat is a type of headgear strongly associated with Australia, and comprises cork strung from the brim, to ward off insects.

World-famous Australian surfwear labels include Billabong, Rip Curl, Mambo and Quiksilver. Australian surfers popularised the ugg boot, a unisex sheepskin boot with fleece on the inside, a tanned outer surface and a synthetic sole. Worn by the working classes in Australia, the boot style emerged as a global fashion trend in the 2000s. Underwear and sleepwear brands include Bonds, Berlei, Bras N Things and Peter Alexander Sleepwear.

The slouch hat was first worn by military forces in Australia in 1885, looped up on one side so that rifles could be held at the slope without damaging the brim. After federation, the slouch hat became standard Australian Army headgear in 1903 and since then it has developed into an important national symbol and is worn on ceremonial occasions by the Australian army.

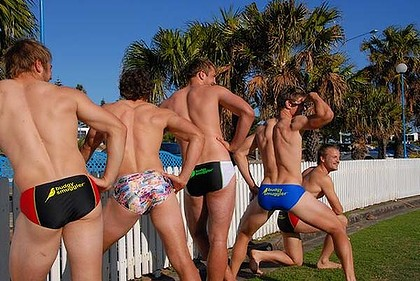
A group of Australian men wearing speedos

Australians generally have a relaxed attitude to what beachgoers wear, although this has not always been the case. At the start of the twentieth century a proposed ordinance in Sydney would have forced men to wear skirts over their "bathing costume" to be decent. This led to the 1907 Sydney bathing costume protests which resulted in the proposal being dropped. In 1961, Bondi inspector Aub Laidlaw, already known for kicking women off the beach for wearing bikinis, arrested several men wearing swim briefs charging them with indecency. The judge found the men not guilty because no pubic hair was exposed. As time went on Australians' attitudes to swimwear became much more relaxed. Over time swim briefs, better known locally as speedos after the Australian brand, became an iconic swimwear for males.

== Sport ==
Early colonial Australian sport was influenced by British sport heritage brought by the convicts and free settlers, serving as a nostalgic link to their nations of origin and a way for replicating the English lifestyle for the upper classes in an environment far from familiar for the settlers. As a result of this influence, many Australians are passionate about sport, and it forms a major part of the country's culture and economy in terms of spectating and participation. Cricket is popular in the summer, and football codes are popular in the winter. Australian traditions such as grand finals and footy tipping are shared among the codes.

Australia's successes in events such as the Olympic Games, Commonwealth Games, World Cup competitions in cricket, rugby union, rugby league, field hockey, netball, and major tournaments in tennis, golf, surfing, and other sports are a source of pride for many Australians. Sports people such as Donald Bradman, Shane Warne, Ian Thorpe, Ellyse Perry, Dawn Fraser, and Cathy Freeman remain in the nation's cultural memory and are accorded high civilian honours and public status.

=== Cricket ===
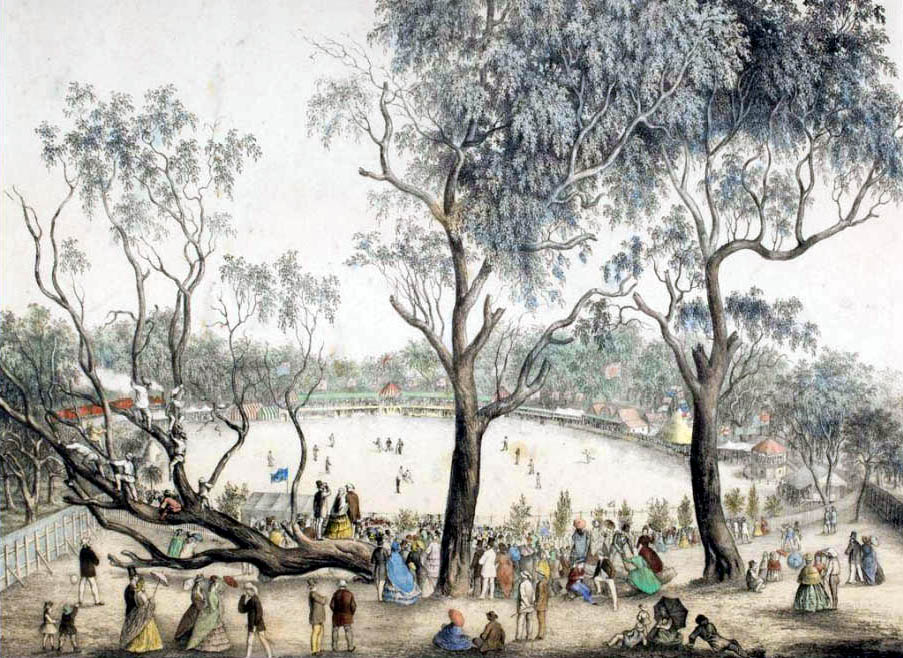
Cricket match at the Melbourne Cricket Ground, 1860s

Cricket is Australia's most popular summer sport and has been played since colonial times. It is followed in all states and territories, unlike the football codes which vary in popularity between regions.

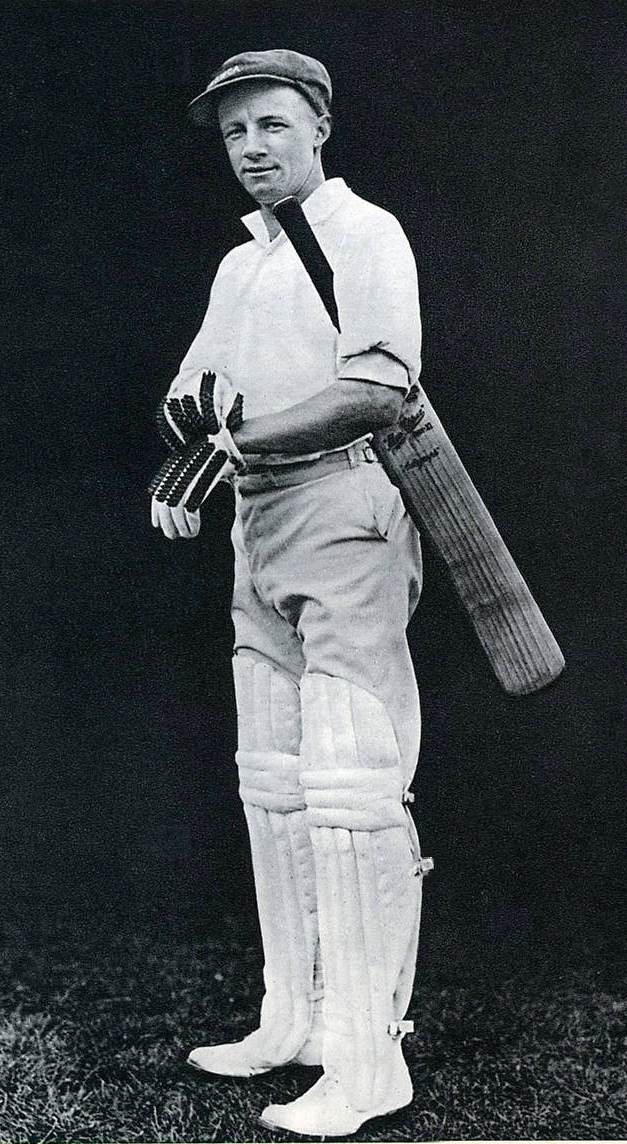
Donald Bradman is often cited as statistically the greatest sportsman of any major sport.

The first recorded cricket match in Australia took place in Sydney in 1803. Intercolonial contests started in 1851 and Sheffield Shield inter-state cricket continues to this day. In 1866–67, prominent cricketer and Australian rules football pioneer Tom Wills coached an Aboriginal cricket team, which later toured England in 1868 under the captaincy of Charles Lawrence. The 1876–77 season is notable for a match between a combined XI from New South Wales and Victoria and a touring English team at the Melbourne Cricket Ground, which was later recognised as the first Test match. A famous victory on the 1882 tour of England resulted in the placement of a satirical obituary in an English newspaper saying that English cricket had "died", and the "body will be cremated and the ashes taken to Australia". The English media then dubbed the next English tour to Australia (1882–83) as the quest to "regain the ashes". This success of the national cricket team ignited sport nationalism in the Australian population, and ultimately helped pave the way for political federation. The tradition continues with the Ashes series, an icon of the sporting rivalry between the two countries.

Australian cricket developed more distinctive traditions after 1900, paralleling the federation of the country in 1901, which helped stimulate pride for "Australian things". Successful cricketers often become lasting celebrities in Australia. Sir Donald Bradman, who made his Test debut in the 1928–29 series against England, is regarded as the game's greatest batsman and a byword for sporting excellence. Other Australian cricketers who remain household names include Richie Benaud, Dennis Lillee and Shane Warne and others who pursued media careers after they retired from the game. Internationally, Australia has for most of the last century sat at or near the top of the cricketing world. In the 1970s, Australian media tycoon Kerry Packer founded World Series Cricket from which many international forms of the game have evolved.

Events on the cricket pitch have occasionally been elevated to diplomatic incidents in Australian history, such as the infamous Bodyline controversy of the 1930s, in which the English team bowled in a physically intimidating way leading to accusations of unsportsmanlike conduct.

=== Football codes ===
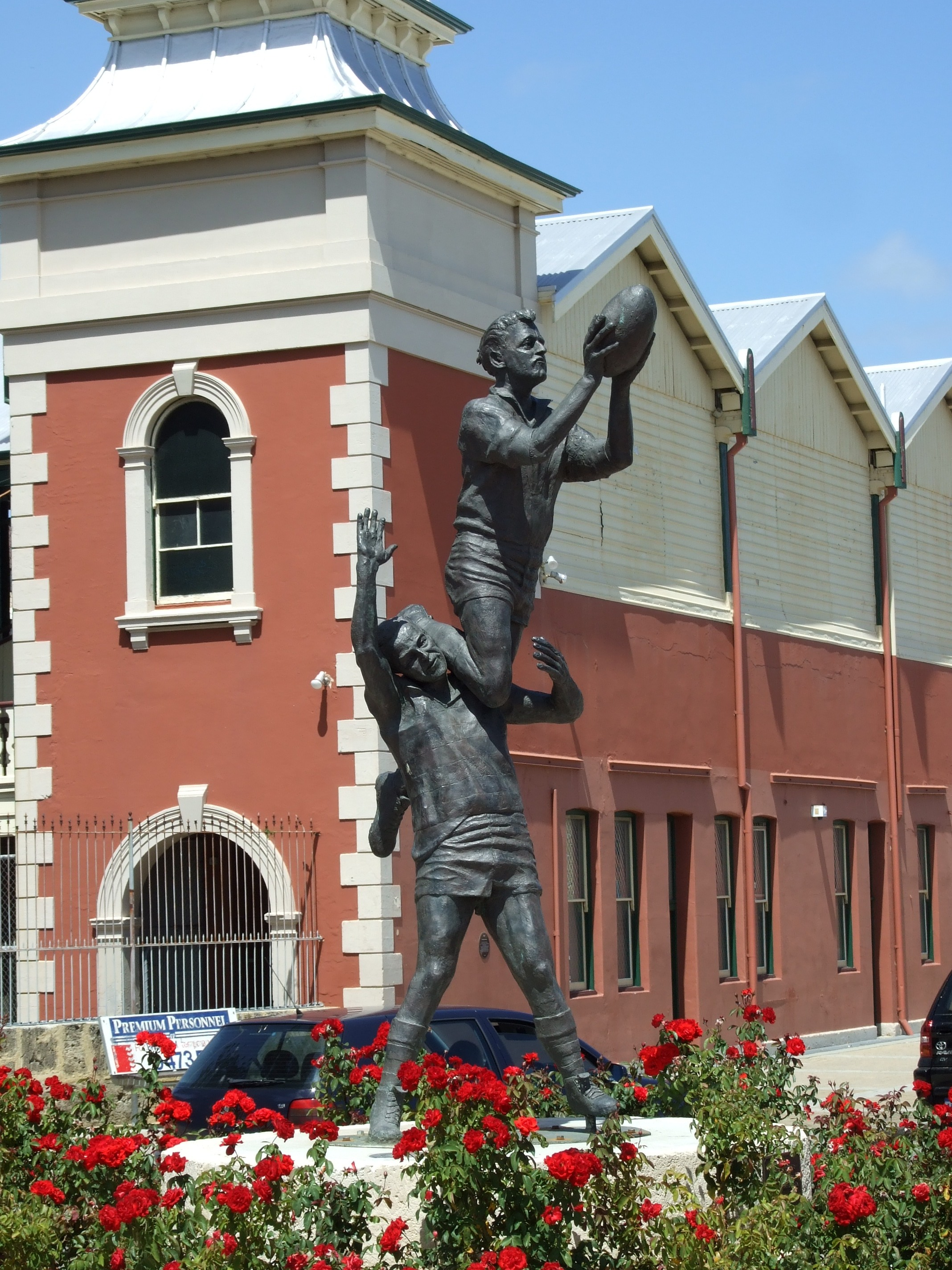
Statue in Fremantle of an Australian rules footballer taking a spectacular mark

Australian rules football is the most highly attended spectator sport in Australia. Its core support lies in four of the six states: Victoria, South Australia, Western Australia and Tasmania. Originating in Melbourne and codified during the late 1850s and early 1860s, the sport is the world's oldest codified football game. The national competition, the Australian Football League (AFL), evolved from the Victorian Football League in 1990, and has expanded to all states except Tasmania. The AFL Grand Final is traditionally played on the last Saturday of September at the Melbourne Cricket Ground, the sport's "spiritual home". Australian rules football culture has a strong set of rituals and traditions, such as kick-to-kick and barracking. International rules football is a hybrid sport of Australian football and Gaelic football devised to facilitate matches between Australia and Ireland.

Rugby union was first played in Australia in the 1860s and is followed predominately in Queensland, New South Wales and the Australian Capital Territory. The national team is known as the Wallabies. Despite having a relatively small player base, Australia has twice won the Rugby World Cup, in 1991 and 1999, and hosted the 2003 Rugby World Cup. Other notable competitions include the annual Bledisloe Cup, played against Australia's main rivals, the New Zealand All Blacks, and the Rugby Championship, involving South Africa, New Zealand, and Argentina. Provincial teams from Australia, South Africa and New Zealand compete in the annual Super Rugby competition. Rugby test matches are also popular and have at times become highly politicised, such as when many Australians, including the Wallabies, demonstrated against the racially selected South African teams of the 1970s. Notable Australian rugby union players include Sir Edward Dunlop, John Eales, Mark Ella and David Campese.

The first State of Origin shield

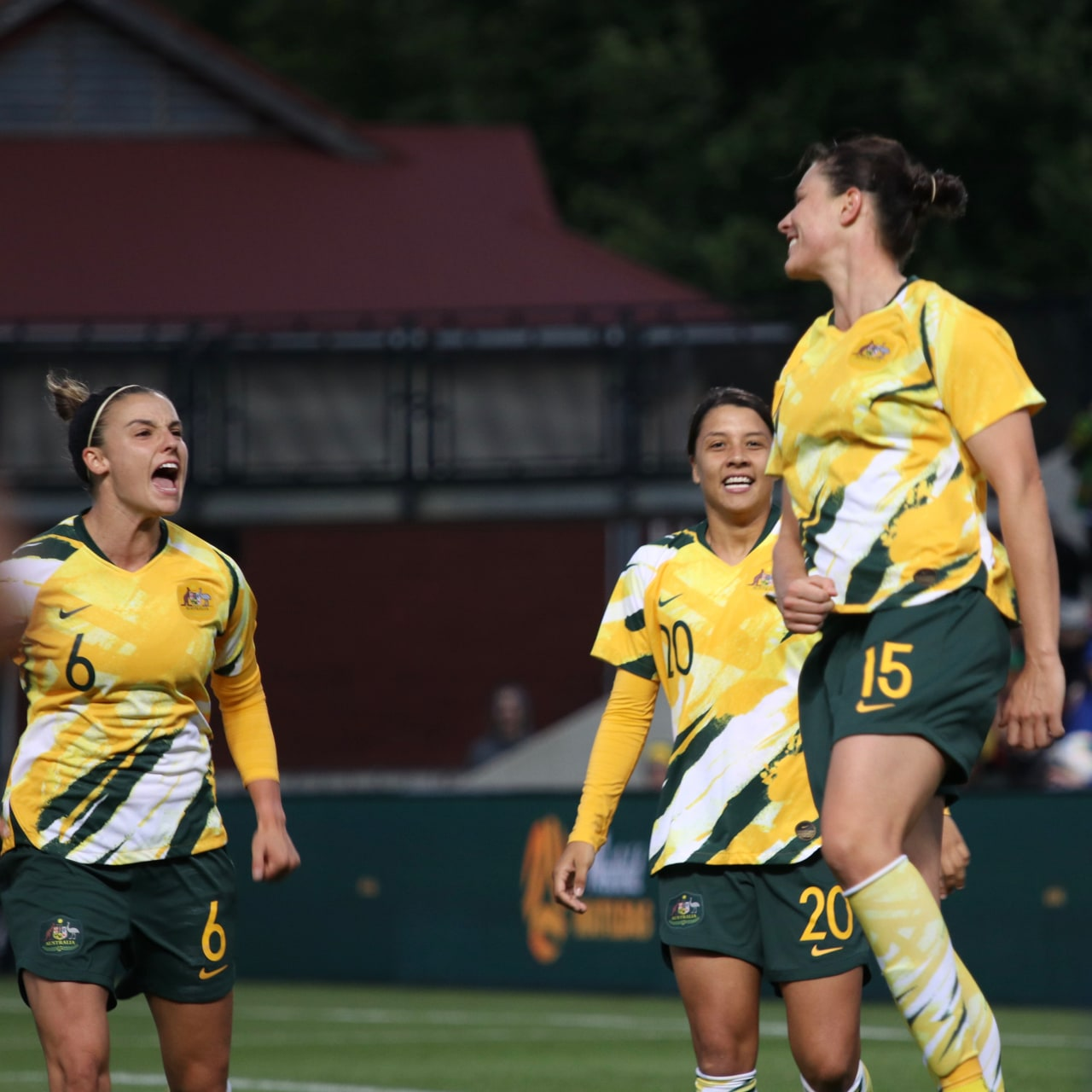
The Matildas, Australia's national women's football team, in 2021

In 1908, rugby league was established in Australia, by former rugby union players and supporters as a breakaway professional code. The new code gained and has maintained a wider following in Australia than rugby union, which remained amateur until the 1990s. The sport has roots in the working class communities of Lancashire and Yorkshire in Northern England, translating to similar areas in Sydney and Brisbane. The elite club competition is the National Rugby League (NRL), which features ten teams from New South Wales, four teams from Queensland, and one team each from Victoria, Australian Capital Territory and New Zealand. The season culminates in the NRL Grand Final. The New South Wales Blues and Queensland Maroons compete in the annual State of Origin series. Australia's national team, the Kangaroos, has contested all 15 Rugby League World Cup titles, winning 11 of them.

Despite attracting less media attention, spectators and sponsorship than Australian rules football and rugby league, soccer is Australia's highest participation football code, although in South Australia, Australian rules football is still the most-participated football code. During the second half of the 20th century many Australian soccer clubs were based around ethnic groups, mostly European. However, the national league was completely reformed in 2004. Australia's national male team, the Socceroos, has competed in the finals of five FIFA World Cup championships. In 2006 the Socceroos moved from the Oceania Football Confederation to the Asian Football Confederation, a much stronger confederation which has allowed the Australian team to avoid repetition of a history of missed World Cup qualifications in forced sudden-death playoffs. Australia won the 2015 AFC Asian Cup. Major international stars from Australia include Tim Cahill, Mark Viduka, Mark Schwarzer and Harry Kewell. In the 2023 FIFA Women's World Cup, Australia's national women's team set an Australian TV rating record, averaging 7.13 million viewers in the semi-finals against England, after the previous game against France became the most viewed event of the year. The significant outpouring of community support for the team was dubbed by the media as "Matildas fever".

=== Water sports ===
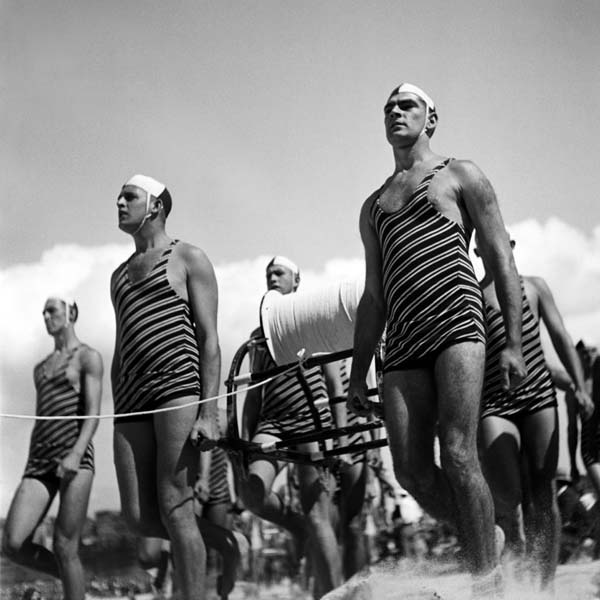
The surf lifesaving movement originated in Australia. Pictured: surf lifesavers, Bondi Beach, 1930s

Australia's warm climate and long coastline of sandy beaches and rolling waves provide ideal conditions for water sports such as swimming and surfing. The majority of Australians live in cities or towns on or near the coast, and so beaches are a place that millions of Australians visit regularly.

Swimming is a popular pastime for Australians. In the early 1900s, members of the Australian Cavill family pioneered the crawl stroke ("Australian crawl") and butterfly stroke. Australia is a world power in Olympic swimming, second only to the United States in total gold medals in the sport. Swimmers like Dawn Fraser, Kieren Perkins and Ian Thorpe have taken multiple gold medals. Most states have a compulsory school swimming program, so it is common for Australians to be competent in swimming and water safety.

Australians have a particular affinity for surf lifesaving, and surf lifesavers have a revered status in Australian culture. The world's first surf lifesaving club, Bondi Surf Bathers' Life Saving Club, was founded at Bondi Beach, Sydney, in 1906. Surf Life Saving Australia has conducted hundreds of thousands of rescues around Australia. Tens of thousands of Australians compete in surf lifesaving training and competitions, such as Ironman events.

In the summer of 1915, Duke Kahanamoku of Hawaii introduced surf board riding to Sydney's Freshwater Beach, amazing locals and starting a long-term love affair with the sport in Australia. Over 1 in 10 Australians surf recreationally, and more Australians have been declared world surfing champions than any other nation.

The Sydney to Hobart yacht race is a much anticipated fixture on the Australian sporting calendar. Australia won the America's Cup under skipper John Bertrand in 1983, becoming the first country other than the United States to win the race.

=== Other sports ===
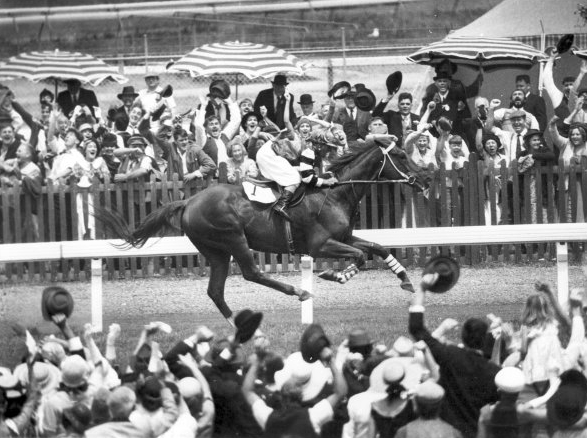
Phar Lap winning the Melbourne Cup, "the race that stops a nation"

Horse racing has had a prominent place in Australian culture since the colonial era, with the first spectator sports event in Australia being Lachlan Macquarie's race meeting at Hyde Park, Sydney, in 1810. First run in 1861, the Melbourne Cup is known as "the race that stops a nation" for the enthusiasm with which Australians tune in for the annual race, and is said to encapsulate the country's twin obsessions of sport and gambling.

Basketball is popular in Australia in terms of participation, especially among children. The National Basketball League (NBL) began in 1979 and is contested by eight teams—seven from Australia and one from New Zealand. The Women's National Basketball League (WNBL) is the top women's basketball league, having begun in 1981, and the national women's team (the Opals) has won medals at the Olympics since 1994. Netball has the highest participation rate of any women's sport in Australia. Established in 2008, the ANZ Championship is the premier netball league in Australia and New Zealand, featuring five teams from each country. The Australian national netball team (the Diamonds) is considered the best in the world, having won 10 of 13 World Netball Championships.

The Australian V8 Supercars series is steadily growing in popularity across the world, where television coverage allows.

Australia regularly raises world champion field hockey teams. Australian cyclists have won international cycling competitions, most notably Cadel Evans' win in the 2011 Tour de France. In 2008, the Tour Down Under, centred around Adelaide, became the first UCI ProTour cycling race to be held outside of Europe. Among young people and within schools nationwide, various forms of handball or downball games have been among the most prevalent sports games for some decades.

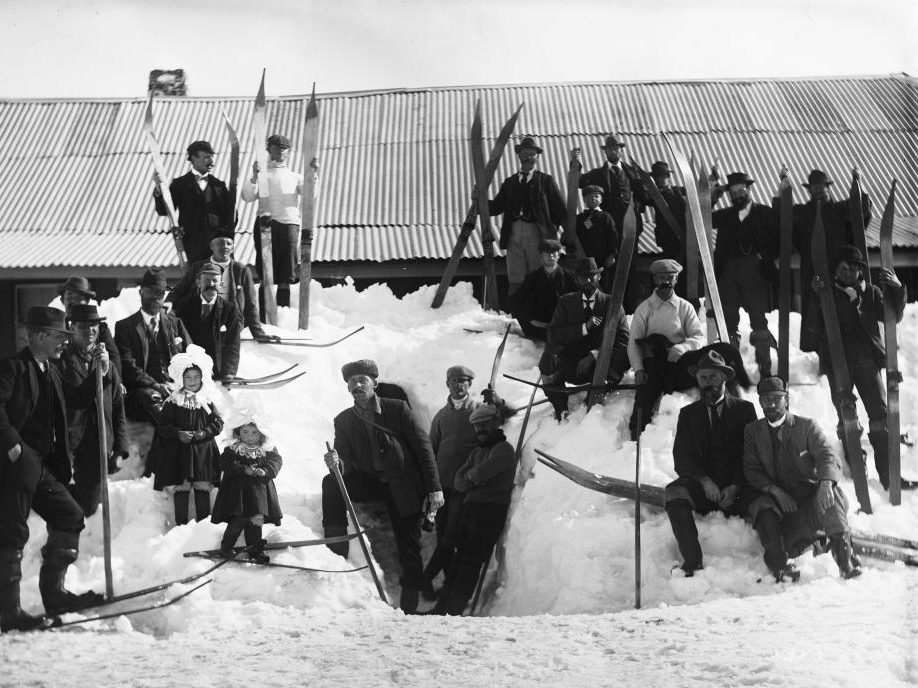
Skiing in Australia began in Kiandra, a goldmining town in the Snowy Mountains of New South Wales, in the 1860s.

Snow sports are enjoyed in the Australian Alps and in Tasmania. Skiing in Australia was first introduced by Norwegian miners in the gold mining town of Kiandra in the Snowy Mountains of New South Wales around 1859. The sport remains a popular winter activity in the south-eastern states and territories. Major alpine skiing resorts include Thredbo, Perisher and Charlotte Pass in New South Wales; Mount Hotham, Falls Creek and Mount Buller in Victoria and Mount Ben Lomond in Tasmania. Extensive areas are available for cross country skiing within national parks including Kosciuszko National Park (NSW), Alpine National Park (VIC); Namadgi National Park (ACT) and in the Tasmanian Wilderness. Australia has long participated in the Winter Olympics and has won medals at the Games since the 1990s.

Increased interest and participation in American sports has led to opportunities for Australians to play at the top level in sports such as baseball, ice hockey and American football. Grant Balfour is a relief pitcher for the Tampa Bay Rays, and played in the 2008 World Series. The skill set of Australian rules footballers fits the mould of US National Football League (NFL) punters, and they stand out from their American peers with their ability to tackle returners. Two former AFL footballers competed in the 2009 NFC Championship game as punters, Saverio Rocca for the Philadelphia Eagles and Ben Graham for the Arizona Cardinals. Graham's appearance in Super Bowl XLIII made him the first Australian to play in the NFL's championship game. The first College Bowl game to feature two Australians was the 2012 BCS National Championship Game with punter Brad Wing from LSU and defensive end Jesse Williams for Alabama. In 2018, Nathan Walker, the first Australian drafted by an NHL team, also became the first to play on a Stanley Cup winning team, the 2018 Washington Capitals.

== Folklore ==
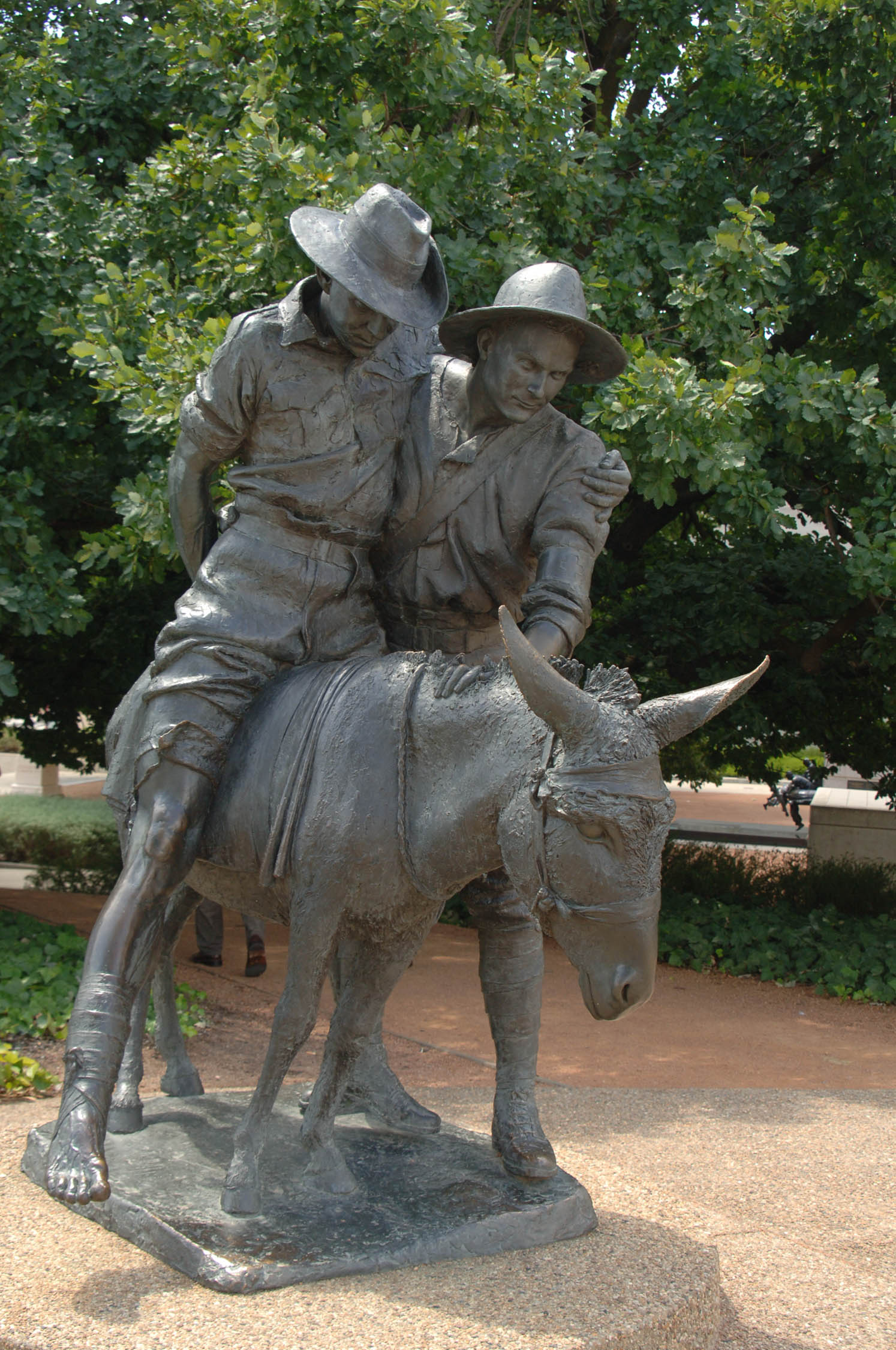
A commemorative statue of John Simpson Kirkpatrick, a famous stretcher bearer who was killed in the Gallipoli Campaign.

Australian stories and legends have a cultural significance independent of their empirical truth or falsehood. This can be seen in the portrayal of bushranger Ned Kelly as a mixture of the underdog and Robin Hood and an example of "the independence and the maverick spirit of early Australia".

Militarily, Australians have served in numerous overseas wars, ranging from World War I through to more recent regional security missions, such as East Timor, Iraq and Afghanistan. Australian war culture generally consists of somber reflection and commemoration, focusing on "on-field heroism and sacrifice" rather than glory. An annual national holiday, Anzac Day, exists for this purpose. The Australian experience of defeat in the Gallipoli Campaign, the first iconic moment in modern Australia's involvement in war, is viewed by Australians with both pride for the fighting of the soldiers, and bitterness for the perceived negligence on the part of British commanders. The instances of bravery and determination displayed during the campaign for Gallipoli, as well as the mutual respect for their Turkish adversaries led by Kemal Atatürk, are seen as part of the ANZAC spirit. During the First World War, Australian soldiers were considered to be remarkably determined, united and hard-working. Many Australians knew how to ride and shoot prior to enlistment, making them talented recruits, but they were also infamous for their lax attitude towards formal parade ground discipline, a notoriety that the Australian soldiers reveled in. From this the notion of the larrikin Digger emerged, an important part of contemporary Australian identity.

== Attitudes, beliefs and stereotypes ==
"Canberra is a poor thing compared to Washington [D.C.] and there is no great metropolis like New York that sets many of the nation's trends. There is no generally acknowledged central city where the important things are believed to happen and it seems better to be."

— Donald Horne in The Lucky Country (1964), describing the comfortable provinciality of Australians and the lack of cultural epicentre in a major city.

=== The Lucky Country ===
The phrase "the lucky country", coined by Donald Horne, is a reference to Australia's weather, lifestyle, and history. Ironically, Horne was using the term to denigrate the political philistinism, a lack of innovation and criticize the complacency of Australian society in the early 1960s. Since he coined the phrase it has commonly been misapplied by both the media and general public to denote Australia's perceived fortunes, despite Horne's lament that Australia had no "major city" that "set the nation's trends". However, a counter-cultural movement and intellectual scene known as the Sydney Push did emerge in Sydney in the 1940s–70s, of which feminist Germaine Greer was a noted member.

The term "cultural cringe" was coined to describe this entrenched national inferiority complex which assumes ideas and cultures of other places are automatically superior. Critics and scholars have sometimes scrutinised the Australian culture, with aspects of it loosely criticised for being kitsch, low-brow or rooted in poor taste. Unsophisticated culture, and those that imbody it are often referred to as "Bogan" or "Bogans". Some links have been made between the cultural cringe and a perceived anti-intellectualism that has underpinned public life in Australia. Some commentators have noted a decline in the cultural cringe in the 21st century, with a "social change" and wider reverence for Australian culture.

=== Mateship ===
"Mateship", or loyal fraternity is the code of conduct, particularly between men, although more recently also between men and women, stressing equality and friendship, particularly during tough times. Any disloyalty to or poor treatment of their "mates" is treated harshly.

The value of mateship is sourced in the difficulty of subduing the land. Unlike other cultures based on a nurturing landscape that they seek to protect from others, Australian settlers experienced great hardship and had to support each other in order to survive. The battle against the elements led to the nickname of a member of Australia's working class being the "Aussie battler".

The mateship culture combined with the original convict and then colonial culture has created an irreverence for established authority, particularly if it is pompous or out of touch with reality. Politicians, or "pollies", are generally disliked and distrusted. Politicians who seek to lead must comply to the views of the egalitarian electorate, who will punish any hint of arrogance or glory-seeking behavior. Voter turnout at elections had in fact been so low that compulsory voting was introduced for the 1925 federal election.

=== Tall Poppy Syndrome ===
Australians particularly dislike bragging or overly advertising one's own successes. The term "tall poppy syndrome" is commonly used to describe people who grow greater than their peers and are harshly criticised as being narcissistic, or "up themselves". Even the most successful and beautiful Australians are eager to proclaim how ordinary they are, to the extent that two-thirds of the highest earning households define themselves as middle class, lower middle class or even working class. Australian's often use self-mockery for humour, as well as ridicule of achievement or success, colloquially known as "taking the piss"

Mirroring the tall poppy syndrome which brings back to Earth the high fliers, the egalitarian Australian society has a traditional Australian support for the underdog. Australians will show support for those who appear to be at a disadvantage even when the underdog is competing against fellow Australians, such as in sporting events.

=== Laid Back ===
This egalitarian social system makes Australians appear "laid-back", welcoming or relaxed to others. Australians generally address one another verbally by the first name alone. In formal situations, people may use a person's title (e.g. Mr., Mrs., Ms., Doctor, etc.) followed by their family name. Middle names are almost never used to address a person, unless quoted on formal/legal documentation.

The term Larrikin is used to describe individual and collective Australians as rowdy, mischievous, ill-disciplined, but good-hearted, and friendly in comparison to British and other cultures.

The laid back nature is epitomised by the colloquial idiom "She'll be right" which means everything will be okay or will work out.

=== The Fair Go ===
Related to the underdog is the belief in a "fair go", which is said to be a key part of Australian culture and Australian society. One accepted definition of a "fair go" in this Australian sense is "a chance, an adequate opportunity. Often used to describe a fair and reasonable course of action". The right to "a fair go" was found to be the most highly rated value in a survey published in 2006 about the opinion of Australian citizens. This belief sustains bipartisan political support for strong public health and education systems in Australia, as well as equal opportunity legislation to ensure people are not excluded from jobs or positions by their race, gender or sexual orientation.

The value of the "fair go" is frequently cited by politicians who wish to associate themselves or their party with the positive connotations of this notion. There has been ongoing public and political discussion of the place and future of "the fair go" in Australian society. This is especially frequent with reference to economic issues and policies. The call for "a fair go" is also regularly used by advocates wanting to point out groups who have been overlooked or treated unfairly according to the expectations of treatment by the wider community. A 21st-century example is the media presentation of the treatment of illegal immigrants, asylum seekers and refugees.

=== Politics ===
Australian political beliefs are largely divided between the democratic socialist Australian Labor Party and a series of anti-Labor parties drawing on the liberal and conservative traditions (the predecessors of the modern Coalition of the Liberals and Nationals). As well as emerging minor parties like the Australian Greens, One Nation, and independent politicians. The Australian Government identifies as a Liberal Democracy, with many Australian values aligned with these tenets including:

- Individualism
- freedom of religion (including the freedom not to follow a particular religion), freedom of speech, and freedom of association
- Rule of law
- Parliamentary democracy with laws determined by parliaments of elected representatives
- equality of opportunity for all people, regardless of their gender, sexual orientation, age, disability, race, or national or ethnic origin

== See also ==
- Australiana
- Australian Aboriginal culture
- Torres Strait Islanders § Culture
- British culture
- Anglo-Saxons § Culture
- New Zealand culture
- Sport in rural and regional Australia
