= Dymphna Clark Memorial Lecture =

Biennial Australian lecture

The Dymphna Clark Memorial Lecture is an Australian lecture series presented in honour of Dymphna Clark, an Australian linguist and educator, and wife of historian Manning Clark.

== History ==
The first Dymphna Clark Memorial Lecture was presented on 2 March 2002 at Manning Clark House in Canberra, Australia by Dymphna's granddaughter, Anna Clark. The following year Dymphna's daughter, Katerina Clark gave the presentation. It was presented annually from its inception until 2014, it and then every two years until 2022, and then in 2025.

== List of lecturers ==
Year	Name	Lecture Title	References
2002	Anna Clark	Heritage and Responsibility	
2003	Katerina Clark	Women, History, Science and Ethics: Identity in Diaspora. A Case Study of the Refugees from Fascism in the 1930s	
2004	Catharine Lumby	The Role of Intellectuals in Public Debate	
2005	Gay Bilson	untitled, on theme Food for Thought	
2006	Anna Rubbo	Make poverty history: Global Studio, the Millennium Development. Goals and some ideas that might make a difference	
2007	Eva Sallis	Australian dream; Australian nightmare — Some thoughts on Multiculturalism and Racism	
2008	Kim Rubenstein	From Suffrage to Citizenship: the creation of a Republic of Equals	
2009	David Headon	Tomatoes, Melbourne Cups and Mark Twain: Sport and the Arts in Australia	
2010	Maggie Beer	Domestic Harvest	
2011	Jackie French	History as Cliché	
2012	Mark McKenna	Rethinking the Republic of Australia for the 21st Century	
2013	Anna Funder	Reading My Mind — and Yours	
2014	Bill Gammage	The Future Makers	
2016	Drusilla Modjeska	Telling Stories	
2018	Clare Wright	You Daughters of Freedom: The Australians who won the vote and inspired the world	
2020	Jenny Hocking	The Palace Letters and the Dismissal	
2022	Amy Remeikis	The Politics of Civility	
2025	Jane Caro	Divide and Conquer	
