= Katerina Clark =

Australian academic (1941–2024)

- Born: 20 June 1941; Surrey Hills, Victoria, Australia
- Died: 1 February 2024 (aged 82)
- Occupation: Academic
- Spouse: Michael Holquist (m. 1974; div. 2010); (m. unknown)
- Children: 2
- Parents: Manning Clark (father); Dymphna Clark (mother)
- Awards: Guggenheim Fellowship (1986)

Academic background
- Education: University of Melbourne; Australian National University; Yale University
- Thesis: The Image of the Intelligent in Soviet Prose Fiction, 1917–1932 (1971)
- Doctoral advisor: Michael Holquist

Academic work
- Discipline: Soviet and Russian studies
- Institutions: University at Buffalo; Wesleyan University; University of Texas at Austin; Indiana University Bloomington; Yale University

Katerina Clark (20 June 1941 – 1 February 2024) was an Australian scholar of Soviet studies. After getting her postgraduate degrees at Australian National University and Yale University, she began working as a professor of Russian and Slavic studies, including at Yale. As an academic, she wrote several books: The Soviet Novel (1981); Mikhail Bakhtin (1986), which she wrote with her husband Michael Holquist; Petersburg: Crucible of Cultural Revolution (1998); Moscow, the Fourth Rome (2011); and Eurasia without Borders (2021).

== Biography ==
=== Early life and education ===
Katerina Clark was born on 20 June 1941 at Mosgiel Private Hospital in Surrey Hills, Victoria, daughter of historian Manning Clark and linguist Dymphna Clark. The family moved due to her father's new jobs: first during his time in Melbourne University to Croydon, Victoria, where she was educated at Croydon State School, and later to the United Kingdom, after he began his sabbatical at Balliol College, Oxford, doing work for A History of Australia and where she was educated at nearby Oxford High School.

When the family returned to Australia, she was educated at Canberra High School, where she was their athletics champion; at Janet Clarke Hall, University of Melbourne, where she got her BA with honours in 1963 as a Russian major; and at Australian National University, where she got her MA with honours in 1967. She obtained her PhD from the Yale University Department of Slavic Languages and Literatures in 1971; her dissertation The Image of the Intelligent in Soviet Prose Fiction, 1917–1932 was supervised by Michael Holquist. She spent several periods during her postgraduate career in the Soviet Union, including a brief stay at Moscow State University while at ANU and several visits to Moscow as part of her PhD.

Clark then started working as a professor of Russian and Slavic studies, particularly as Assistant Professor of Russian at the University at Buffalo (1970–1972) and at Wesleyan University (1972–1976). She later worked as Assistant Professor of Slavic Languages and Literatures at University of Texas at Austin (1976–1980) and Indiana University Bloomington (1981–1983), during which Holquist also led their Slavic studies departments. In 1983, she was promoted to Associate Professor, and in 1986 she returned to her alma mater Yale and became Associate Professor of Comparative Literature. In May 2019, she was named the B.E. Bensinger Professor of Comparative Literature and of Slavic Languages and Literatures.

=== Academic career ===
In 1981, Clark published the book The Soviet Novel, which Vera Sandomirsky Dunham called "a brave and intelligent study of the Soviet novel"; it was also Evgeny Dobrenko's first English-to-Russian book translation, which he did while a doctoral candidate. In 1986, she and her husband co-authored Mikhail Bakhtin, a study of the Russian scholar of the same name, and she was awarded a Guggenheim Fellowship for "a study of the intellectual life of Petersburg/Petrograd/Leningrad, 1913–1931"; this later became her 1998 book Petersburg: Crucible of Cultural Revolution. She also won the 1996 Wayne S. Vucinich Book Prize.

Clark and Dobrenko were co-editors of Soviet Culture and Power, a 2005 volume in Yale University Press' Annals of Communism Series. She was awarded the 2008 American Association of Teachers of Slavic and East European Languages Award for Outstanding Contribution to Scholarship. By the 2010s, her research had shifted towards the Soviet regime's interwar period approach towards Eurasianism. She was given the honorable mention for the Association for Women in Slavic Studies' 2012 Heldt Prize Best Book by a Woman in any area of Slavic/East European/Eurasian Studies for her book Moscow, the Fourth Rome, which focuses on the intellectual life of 1930s Moscow. She won the 2021 Matei Calinescu Prize for her book Eurasia without Borders.

=== Personal life and death ===
Clark married Holquist in 1974, and they had two sons. In addition to their home in Hamden, Connecticut, where they moved when she became a Yale professor, they also owned another home near Wapengo Lake in Bega Valley Shire. Her son Nicholas recalled that she was an enthusiastic bicycle rider "just about everywhere in the New Haven, Connecticut area, well into her 70s", and that she would often go to Vermont to hike with her family. The couple later divorced in 2010, before remarrying afterwards.

While a student at Oxford High School, Clark befriended future actress Miriam Margolyes, also an Oxford High student. Margolyes later came out as lesbian in a letter she wrote to Clark, and they reunited in 1968 during a trip to Europe, where Clark introduced Margolyes to Heather Sutherland, Clark's friend from Canberra High and later Margolyes' partner. She was also a friend of fellow Soviet studies scholar Sheila Fitzpatrick.

Clark died on 1 February 2024, after a year and a half of suffering from lymphoma, aged 82. Her younger brother Andrew wrote her Sydney Morning Herald obituary.

== Bibliography ==
- The Soviet Novel (1981)
- (with Michael Holquist) Mikhail Bakhtin (1986)
- Petersburg: Crucible of Cultural Revolution (1998)
- (ed. with Evgeny Dobrenko) Soviet Culture and Power (2007)
- Moscow, the Fourth Rome (2011)
- Eurasia without Borders (2021)
