= Elizabeth Humphrys =

Australian political economist, academic and author

- Awards: Dr A M Hertzberg Fellow at the State Library of NSW (2019)

Academic background
- Education: Deakin University (BA); University of Technology Sydney (MA); University of Sydney (PhD)
- Thesis: The Corporatist Origins of Neoliberalism: Australia’s Accord, the Labour Movement and the Neoliberal Project (2016)
- Doctoral advisor: Damien Cahill
- Influences: Antonio Gramsci, Karl Marx, Humphrey McQueen

Academic work
- Institutions: University of Technology Sydney; University of Sydney
- Main interests: industrial relations, workplace safety, climate change, anti-politics
- Notable works: How Labour Built Neoliberalism: Australia’s Accord, the Labour Movement and the Neoliberal Project (2019)
- Website: https://profiles.uts.edu.au/Elizabeth.Humphrys/about

Elizabeth Teresa Humphrys is an Australian political economist, policy analyst and author at the University of Technology Sydney. Humphrys is notable for her research on the Australian Labor Party, the Hawke government and trade unions in the implementation of neoliberalism in Australia. Humphrys has also published and spoken on anti-politics, and the impacts of climate change for workers. Her work has been commented on in the Guardian Australia and Financial Times.

== Education ==
Humphrys received her Bachelor of Arts from Deakin University in 1997. She later undertook a Graduate Certificate in Social Inquiry and a Master of Arts research qualification at the University of Technology Sydney. Her MA thesis was entitled, "From Offence to Defence: The Australian Global Justice Movement and the Impact of 9/11". In 2016, Humphrys was awarded a Doctor of Philosophy at the University of Sydney for a thesis on the contribution of the labour movement to the rise of neoliberalism.

== Academic career ==
Humphrys became a lecturer at UTS in 2016. She has authored and co-authored over 20 articles and chapters since 2009, as well as four policy reports on heat stress to workers and climate change in association with the United Workers Union, State Library of New South Wales, City of Sydney and the Centre for Future Work. Humphrys is an editor of the Social Movement Studies journal and associate editor of the Economic and Labour Relations Review. Humphrys was an Inaugural and the Oceania Editor of Interface: A Journal For and About Social Movements until 2017, an international journal she and other scholar activists established in 2009.

Along with her collaborator, Sarah Gregson, Humphrys has received press attention about the history of the West Gate Bridge collapse, which occurred in 1970. Humphrys has also been a commentator on the state of Australian politics and trade unions. Her work on the Prices and Incomes Accord of the 1980s and 1990s has received much commentary from journalists and academics.

"We're currently in a period of quite weak union power and industrially unions have not been very proactive. I guess it is unusual compared to the last few years ... but in historic terms we're such a long distance from the 1970s which is a high period of industrial activity."

Journalist Jeff Sparrow has described her book How Labour Built Neoliberalism as ‘tremendously important’ in understanding the recent history of the Australian Labour Party and the economy. Several current and former union officials have praised the book, including Tim Lyons, former Assistant Secretary of the Australian Council of Trade Unions, who said: ‘For those who promoted the Accords’ between the ALP and ACTU her book ‘is a punch in the guts. It is a punch that lands and hurts. And a punch that has been a long time coming’. United Workers Union leader Godfrey Moase argues alternatively that the book helps the labour movement come to terms with the Accord period, and that ‘Humphrys writes with the compassion of a comrade and the insight of an intellectual who grew up in a working-class household’. Some in the ALP and unions have criticised the book, most prominently former National Treasurer of Australia Wayne Swan.

Humphrys held a fellowship at the WZB Berlin Social Science Centre Berlin in 2013, and in 2019 was awarded the prestigious Dr A M Hertzberg Fellow at the State Library of NSW. Humphrys is an Associate at think tank the Centre for Future Work, based at The Australia Institute.

== Personal life ==
Humphrys was born in Melbourne and grew up Hoppers Crossing and Werribee.

Humphrys was originally an undergraduate at the University of Melbourne and was General Secretary of the Melbourne University Student Union in 1994, and a key figure in the campaign against the Kennett Government's introduction of Voluntary Student Unionism. In 1995 Humphrys was the National Welfare Officer of the National Union of Students. In 2000 Humphrys helped organise the s11 protest against the meeting of the World Economic Forum in Melbourne, which blockaded the Crown Casino over three days.

She has spoken publicly about her "several underlying health conditions" and the difficulty of avoiding COVID-19. She is a supporter of the Extinction Rebellion.

== Bibliography ==
=== Author ===
- — (2019). How Labour Built Neoliberalism: Australia's Accord, the Labour Movement and the Neoliberal Project. Boston: Brill. ISBN 9789004383463.

=== Editor ===
- —; Tietze, Tad; Rundle, Guy, eds. (2011). On Utøya: Anders Breivik, Right Terror, Racism and Europe. Location not disclosed: Elguta Press. ISBN 978-0-9870588-0-5.
