= Digger (soldier) =

Military slang

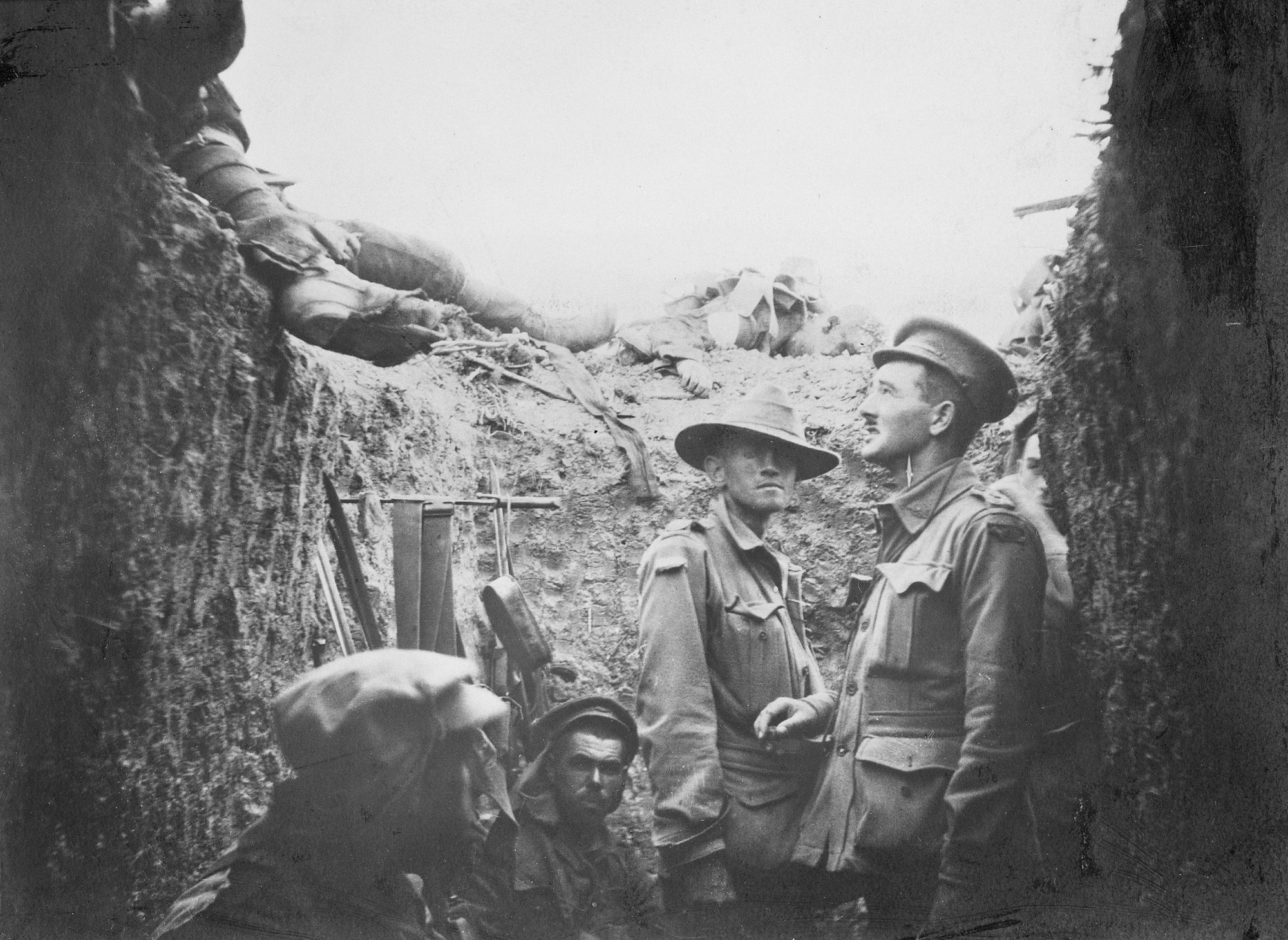
Soldiers from the Australian Imperial Force in a trench at Lone Pine, during the Gallipoli Campaign, 1915

Digger is a military slang term for primarily infantry soldiers from Australia and New Zealand. Evidence of its use has been found in those countries as early as the 1850s, but its current usage in a military context did not become prominent until World War I, when Australian and New Zealand troops began using it on the Western Front around 1916–17. Evolving out of its usage during the war, the term has been linked to the concept of the Anzac legend, but within a wider social context, it has long been linked to the concept of "egalitarian mateship".

== Origin ==
Before World War I, the term "digger" was widely used in Australasia to mean a miner, and also referred to a Kauri gum-digger in New Zealand. In Australia and New Zealand, the term "digger" has egalitarian connotations from the Victorian Eureka Stockade Rebellion of 1854, and was closely associated with the principles of mateship, which may have had resonance from earlier use of the term "diggers" as egalitarians. Many Australian and New Zealand soldiers in the Second Boer War (1899–1902) were former miners, and at the Battle of Elands River (1900), the Australian defenders earned a reputation as diggers, hastily constructing dugout defences in the hard ground.

Following the landing at Anzac Cove on 25 April 1915, at the start of the Gallipoli Campaign, General Sir Ian Hamilton wrote to General William Birdwood, the commander of the Australian and New Zealand Army Corps (ANZAC), adding in postscript: "You have got through the difficult business, now you have only to dig, dig, dig, until you are safe." However, writer Tim Lycett argues that there is no hard evidence to suggest that Hamilton's message is the reason why "digger" was applied to ANZAC troops in general.

W. H. Downing, in Digger Dialects, a glossary of words and phrases used by Australian personnel during the war, says that digger was first used in 1916 to mean a New Zealand or Australian soldier. It appears to have become popular among New Zealand troops before being adopted by Australians, and was not in wide use amongst soldiers until 1917. According to Lycett, Cyril Longmore, the author of the Australian 44th Battalion's official history, recorded the term being used by members of the battalion, in a manner synonymous with the word "cobber", during their time digging trenches while training in the Salisbury Plain Training Area in late 1916, while the 3rd Division prepared to deploy to the Western Front. Using Longmore's book, and letters he published later, Lycett asserts that the term possibly gained prominence following a speech from the 11th Brigade's commander, Brigadier James Cannan, about the digging "prowess" of the 44th Battalion, many of whom had worked in the Western Australian goldfields prior to enlisting.

== Link with the Anzac legend ==
At the outbreak of World War I, Australia and New Zealand were both relatively "young" nations, with little exposure on the international stage. Deployed to Gallipoli in early 1915, the soldiers of both nations had a chance to prove themselves. Although the Gallipoli campaign resulted in heavy casualties and ultimately ended in withdrawal for the Allies, the campaign became strongly linked with the emergence of national identity in Australia and New Zealand. Through the manner in which the Australian and New Zealand soldiers endured the hardships of battle, the image that has become synonymous with the word "digger" has become linked with the concept of the Anzac legend, embodying the qualities of "endurance, courage, ingenuity, good humour, and [...] mateship". In Australia, as the nation became more industrialised and urbanised, the term later assumed the qualities previous ascribed to the "bushman", including traits such as "hardiness, democratic spirit, mateship and resourcefulness".

== Usage ==
While the Australians and New Zealanders would call each other "Digger", the British tended to call the New Zealanders "Kiwis" and Australians "Diggers". The equivalent slang for a British soldier was "Tommy" from Tommy Atkins.

== Sports teams ==
Between 1998 and 2003, the term was used in the name of a team in the Victorian Football League, the Bendigo Diggers. This was partly in reference to Bendigo's history as a centre of the gold-mining industry. The team changed its nickname to "Bombers" when it became aligned to Essendon. In 2001, Athletics Australia suggested that it would use "Diggers" as the nickname of the Australian athletics team. The proposal was withdrawn after a public outcry and protest from the Returned and Services League of Australia.

== See also ==
- Digger slang
- Slouch hat
- Gunnie
- Pat Hanna – Creator of Pat Hanna's Diggers
- Doughboy – Term for an American infantryman
- Poilu – Term for a French infantryman
- Mehmetçik – Turkish slang for a common soldier
