= Mishukov =

Mishukov, feminine: Mishukova is a Russian surname. Notable people with the surname include:

- Ivan Mishukov
- Bogdan Mishukov
- Oleg Mishukov
- Darya Mishukova (born 1979), Russian orientalist, vietnamologist and cultural activist
