= Mobilization (journal) =

Mobilization: The International Quarterly Review of Social Movement Research
- Discipline: Sociology
- Language: English
- Edited by: Neal Caren

Publication details
- History: 1996–present
- Publisher: San Diego State University (United States)
- Frequency: Quarterly
- Impact factor: 1.5 (2022)

Standard abbreviations
- ISO 4: Mobilization

Indexing
- ISSN: 1938-1514 (print); 1086-671X (web)
- LCCN: 96657487
- JSTOR: 1086671X
- OCLC no.: 34054323

Links
- Journal homepage; Online archive

Mobilization is an academic journal that publishes original research and academic reviews of books concerned mainly with sociological research on protests, social movements, and collective behavior.

The journal was established in 1996 by Hank Johnston (San Diego State University). Johnston edited the journal for eleven years, after which he was succeeded by Daniel J. Myers (University of Notre Dame) and then Rory McVeigh (University of Notre Dame). During Johnston's run as editor, the journal moved first from two to three issues per year and, starting with volume eleven, eventually became a quarterly journal. The current editor-in-chief is Neal Caren (University of North Carolina at Chapel Hill). Catherine Corrigall-Brown (University of British Columbia) is the incoming editor-in-chief.

In 2017 the journal was listed by Stefan Berger and Holger Nehrin, in their book The History of Social Movements in Global Perspective, as one of the "main academic journals" in the field of social movement studies, alongside Social Movement Studies and the open access Interface: A Journal for and About Social Movements.

According to the Journal Citation Reports, the journal has a 2019 impact factor of 1.327, ranking it 76th out of 150 journals in the category "Sociology" and making it the second-highest impact journal in social movement studies, behind Social Movement Studies.
