= Gunny (nickname) =

Gunny is the nickname of a United States Marine Corps gunnery sergeant. It is also the nickname of:

Soldiers and fictional characters with the nickname based on their military rank are excluded, as they are too numerous.

- Gonville Bromhead (1845–1891), British Army officer awarded the Victoria Cross
- Gunny Bush (born 1974), American murderer awaiting execution
- Thomas Harboe, American architect who restored the Marquette Building and the Chicago Board of Trade Building
- Gunnhildur Yrsa Jónsdóttir (born 1988), Icelandic female footballer
- Chain pickerel, a species of freshwater fish

== See also ==
- Günny Kruse, a former member of the German band Paragon (2003–2009)
- Gunnie, a Royal Australian Air Force term for a type of armourer or aircraft technician
- Gunnies, a mining term with several meanings
- Gunnie Rose, a character in books by Charlaine Harris
