= Stefan Berger =

Stefan Berger may refer to:

- Stefan Berger (historian)
- Stefan Berger (politician)
