= Daniel J. Myers =

American university president (born 1966)

15th President of Misericordia University
- Incumbent
- Assumed office July 1, 2021
- Preceded by: Kathleen Owens

Personal details
- Born: April 9, 1966 (age 58); Xenia, Ohio, U.S.
- Education: Ohio State University (BA, MA); University of Wisconsin-Madison (MS, PhD)
- Awards: Sheedy Teaching Award
- Website: Office of the president
- Scientific career
- Fields: Sociology
- Institutions: American University; Marquette University; Misericordia University
- Thesis: Diffusion Models for Riots and Other Collective Violence

Daniel J. Myers (born April 9, 1966, in Xenia, Ohio) is the President of Misericordia University in Dallas, Pennsylvania and a professor of sociology. His best known research is on the urban unrest of the 1960s and the media coverage of those riots, specializing in identifying the patterns of unrest diffusion. He has written several books and articles, and is co-author of the best-selling sociological social psychology textbook, Social Psychology.

== Early life and education ==
Daniel Myers was born in Xenia, Ohio, a town of approximately 20,000. His father was a Baptist minister. Myers moved throughout the United States during his childhood, including to New York, Pittsburgh, Indiana, Ohio, and West Virginia. Myers graduated from high school in Zanesville, and then graduated from The Ohio State University in Columbus, Ohio, in 1988 with a B.A. in political science and in 1991 with a M.A. in higher education and Student Affairs. In 1995, Myers graduated from the University of Wisconsin, Madison with a M.S. in sociology, followed by a PhD in sociology in 1997. He wrote his dissertation on 'Diffusion Models for Riots and Other Collective Violence'.

== Research areas ==
Myers' principal research interests are collective behavior and social movements. His most recent work focuses on racial rioting in the 1960s and 1970s, deterministic and stochastic models of diffusion for collective violence, mathematical models of collective action, media coverage of protests, demonstrations, and riots, and game theoretic analyses of small group negotiation.

== Former positions ==
Myers as Provost and Chief Academic Officer at American University in Washington, D.C., Provost and Executive Vice President of Academic Affairs at Marquette University in Milwaukee, WI. Before that he held a number of positions at the University of Notre Dame including Vice President and Associate Provost, Professor of Sociology, and Director of Research and Faculty Development at the Kroc Institute for International Peace Studies. He founded the Center for the Study of Social Movements and served as editor of Mobilization: The International Quarterly Review of Social Movement Research. Myers also served as a Senior Fellow for the Phelps-Stokes Fund in Washington, D.C., was vice-president of the Board of the South Bend Symphony Orchestra, and was President of Board of the Good Shepherd Montessori School (South Bend, Indiana).

== Honors and awards ==
Dr. Myers has received the following honors and awards:

- Sheedy Teaching Award from the Notre Dame College of Arts and Letters in 2007.
- Best Published Article from the American Sociological Association Section on Collective Behavior and Social Movements in 2005, co-authored with Beth Schaefer Caniglia.
- Elected to Alpha Kappa Delta in 2004.
- Kaneb Teaching Award for Excellence in Undergraduate Teaching from the University of Notre Dame in 2002.
- Katherine DuPre Lumpkin Dissertation Award for Outstanding Dissertation in Sociology from the University of Wisconsin, Madison in 1998.
- Genevieve Gorst Herfurth Award for the best paper written by a graduate student in the social sciences from the University of Wisconsin, Madison in 1996.
- Runner-up for the Graduate Student Paper Competition from the American Sociological Association Section on Collective Behavior and Social Movements in 1995.
- Teaching Leadership Award from The Pew Charitable Trusts in 1993.
