= Dog Boy (novel) =

Book by Eva Hornung

- First edition
- Author: Eva Hornung
- Language: English
- Genre: Novel
- Publisher: Text Publishing, Australia
- Publication date: 2009
- Publication place: Australia
- Media type: Print (Hardback and Paperback)
- Pages: 293
- ISBN: 9781921520426
- Preceded by: The Marsh Birds

Dog Boy (2009) is a novel by Australian author Eva Hornung. It won the 2010 Prime Minister's Literary Award for fiction and was inspired by the story of a feral child in Russia, Ivan Mishukov.

== Background and synopsis ==
The story was inspired by the story of feral child Ivan Mishukov.

Romochka is a feral child, raised by dogs and found on the streets of Moscow in the summer of 1998. He appears to be six years old and has been with the pack for two years. This novel examines his life on the streets and the changes he undergoes as he transforms from "dog" to "boy".

== Publication ==
Dog Boy, by Eva Hornung, was published in 2009 by Text Publishing.

The book is dedicated "For Philip Waldron".

== Reviews ==
Writing in The Guardian reviewer John Burnside called the book "a wonderful novel, a tour de force, even."

In Australian Book Review Judith Armstrong noted that "the whole novel is beautifully written".

== Awards and nominations ==
- 2009 shortlisted Victorian Premier's Literary Awards — The Vance Palmer Prize for Fiction
- 2010 shortlisted Australian Literature Society Awards — ALS Gold Medal
- 2010 shortlisted Australian Book Industry Awards (ABIA) — Australian Literary Fiction Book of the Year
- 2010 winner Prime Minister's Literary Awards — Fiction

== Translations ==
- German: Dog Boy. Translation by Thomas Gunkel. Suhrkamp Verlag 2011. ISBN 978-3-518-46288-1.
- Spanish: El Niño Perro. Editorial Salamandra 2010. ISBN 9788498383072.
