= Ivan Mishukov =

Russian feral child

- Born: 6 May 1992 (age 34); Reutov, Russia
- Occupations: Soldier, factory worker
- Known for: Feral child who lived with dogs

Ivan Mishukov (born 6 May 1992) is a former Russian feral child who lived with dogs for about two years between the ages of four and six. As an adult, he trained as a soldier in the Russian Army, before switching to factory work.

== Early life and adoption by dog pack ==
Ivan Mishukov was born in Reutov on 6 May 1992. When he was four, he left his home to escape his mother and her alcoholic boyfriend. He gained the trust of stray dogs on the streets of Moscow by providing them with food, and in return, he was protected by the pack. Eventually, he was made pack leader.

Mishukov was captured by Moscow City Police in 1998, when he was six. The police separated the boy from the dogs by leaving bait for the pack in a restaurant kitchen. Prior to capture, he had escaped the police three times, defended by the pack.

Mishukov was placed with a foster mother, Tatiana Babanina, and years later, he was accepted into the Kronshtadt naval cadet school.

== Adult life ==
Mishukov studied in military school and served in the Russian Army.

As of 2019, Mishukov had moved back to Reutov and was employed as a factory worker.

== In the arts and media ==
Mishukov has given interviews on Russian and Ukrainian national television.

In 2009, his story influenced English playwright Hattie Naylor to write a play about his time on the streets called Ivan and the Dogs, which won the Tinniswood Award for original radio drama and was nominated in the 2010 Olivier Awards for Outstanding Contribution to Theatre. The play was adapted for the cinema as Lek and the Dogs (2017).

The story of Ivan Mishukov caught the attention of Australian writer Eva Hornung, whose novel Dog Boy (2009) shares many of the same elements of Ivan's story, including capture by leaving bait at a restaurant. Another author, Bobbie Pyron, also wrote a book about Ivan and his time on the streets with the dogs, called The Dogs of Winter.
