= Social Movement Studies =

- Discipline: Sociology, political science, anthropology
- Language: English
- Edited by: Cristina Flesher Fominaya

Publication details
- History: 2002–present
- Publisher: Routledge
- Frequency: Bimonthly
- Impact factor: 2.748 (2021)

Standard abbreviations
- ISO 4: Soc. Mov. Stud.

Indexing
- ISSN: 1474-2837 (print); 1474-2829 (web)
- OCLC no.: 50327191

Links
- Journal homepage; Online access; Online archive

Social Movement Studies is a bimonthly peer-reviewed academic journal covering social science research on protests, social movements, and collective behavior, including reviews of books on these topics. It was established in 2002 as a biannual journal by founding co-editors Tim Jordan, Adam Lent, and George McKay, soon to be joined by Anne Mische, and is published by Routledge. The current editor-in-chief is Cristina Flesher Fominaya (Aarhus University) . Previous editors-in-chief include and Kevin Gillan (University of Manchester), Graeme Hayes (Aston University) and Brian Doherty (Keele University).

In 2017 the journal was listed by Stefan Berger and Holger Nehrin, in their book The History of Social Movements in Global Perspective, as one of the "main academic journals" in the field of social movement studies, alongside Mobilization and the open access Interface: A Journal for and About Social Movements.

== Abstracting and indexing ==
The journal is abstracted and indexed in Current Contents/Social & Behavioral Sciences, Social Sciences Citation Index, and Scopus. According to the Journal Citation Reports, the journal has a 2018 impact factor of 2.0.
