= Interface: A Journal for and About Social Movements =

- Discipline: Sociology, political sciences
- Language: English and others
- Edited by: Editorial collective

Publication details
- History: 2009–present
- Frequency: Biannually
- Open access: Yes
- License: CC BY-NC-ND

Standard abbreviations
- ISO 4: Interface: J. Soc. Mov.

Indexing
- ISSN: 2009-2431

Links
- Journal homepage

Interface: A Journal for and About Social Movements is an open access academic journal that covers original research and reviews of books concerned mainly with protests, social movements, and collective behavior.

In 2017 Interface was listed by Stefan Berger and Holger Nehrin, in their book The History of Social Movements in Global Perspective, as one of the "main academic journals" in the field of social movement studies, alongside Mobilization and Social Movement Studies.
