= Anzac spirit =

Concept suggesting Australian and New Zealand soldiers sharing same characteristics

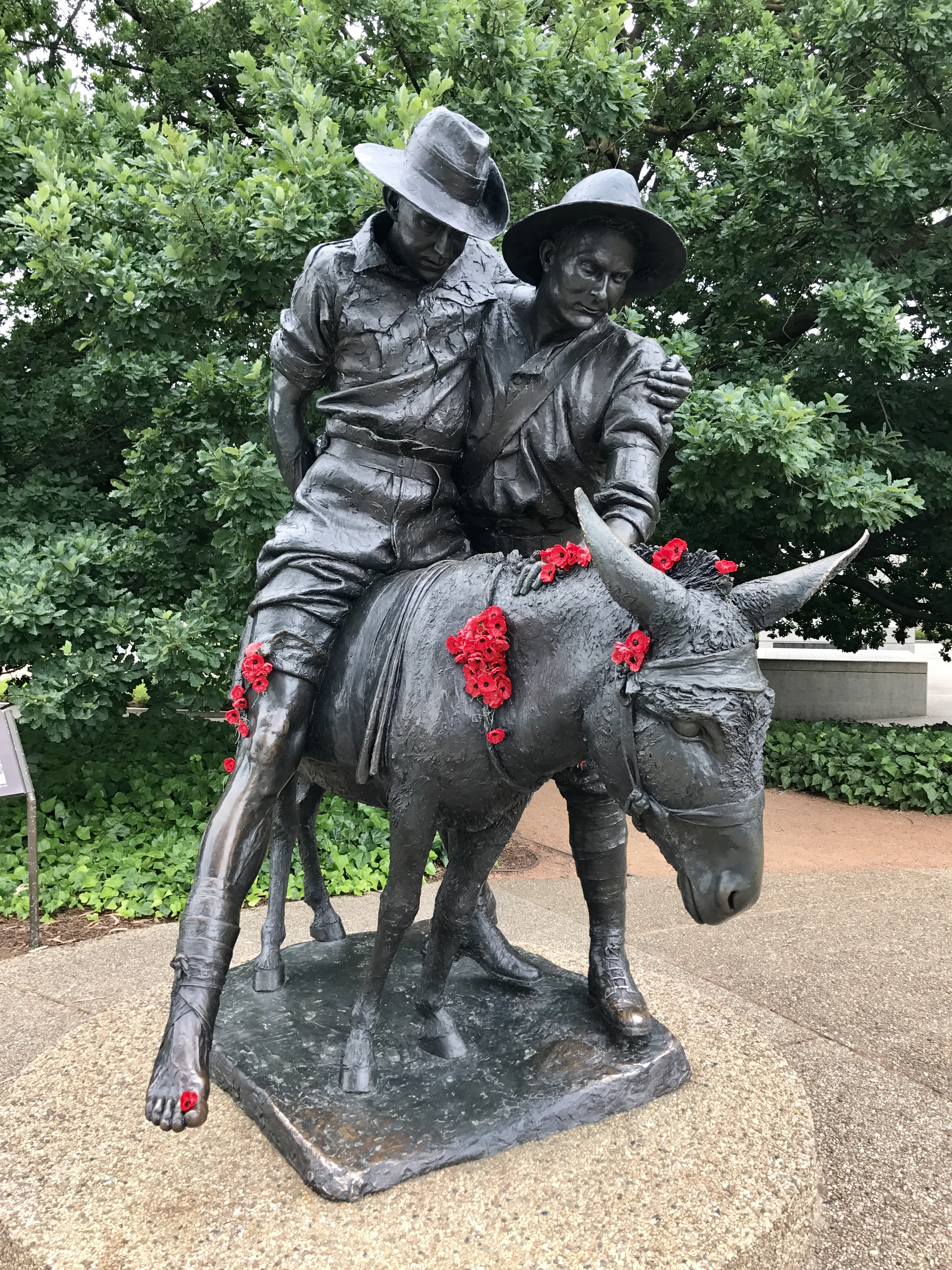
Simpson and his donkey statue by Peter Corlett outside the Australian War Memorial, Canberra

The ANZAC spirit or ANZAC legend is a concept which suggests that Australian and New Zealand soldiers possess shared characteristics, specifically the qualities those soldiers allegedly exemplified on the battlefields of World War I. These perceived qualities include endurance, courage, ingenuity, good humour, larrikinism, and mateship. According to this concept, the soldiers are perceived to have been innocent and fit, stoical and laconic, irreverent in the face of authority, naturally egalitarian, and disdainful of British class differences. A body of Australian scholarship argues that the Anzac legend functions as a national origin myth that displaces and silences the history of frontier violence and dispossession of Aboriginal Australians.

The ANZAC spirit also tends to capture the idea of an Australian and New Zealand "national character", with the Gallipoli Campaign sometimes described as the moment of birth of the nationhood both of Australia and of New Zealand. It was first expressed in the reporting of the landing at Anzac Cove by Ellis Ashmead-Bartlett; as well as later on and much more extensively by Charles Bean. It is regarded as an Australian legend, although its critics refer to it as the ANZAC myth.

== Historical development of the concept ==
The British war correspondent Ellis Ashmead-Bartlett provided the first reports of the landing at Anzac Cove by the newly formed Australian and New Zealand Army Corps (ANZAC). His report was published in Australia on 8 May 1915:

They waited neither for orders nor for the boats to reach the beach, but, springing out into the sea, they waded ashore, and, forming some sort of rough line, rushed straight on the flashes of the enemy's rifles.

Ashmead-Bartlett's account of the soldiers was unashamedly heroic:

There has been no finer feat in this war than this sudden landing in the dark and the storming of the heights... General Birdwood told the writer that he couldn't sufficiently praise the courage, endurance and the soldierly qualities of the Colonials. [The Australians] were happy because they had been tried for the first time and not found wanting.

Also in 1915, in response to the reporting of the efforts of the Australian troops, the Australian poet Banjo Paterson wrote "We're All Australians Now", including the verse:

The mettle that a race can show
Is proved with shot and steel,
And now we know what nations know
And feel what nations feel.

The ANZAC spirit was particularly popularised by Charles Bean, Australia's official war historian. For the soldiers at Battle of Gallipoli, Bean argued, life would not have been worth living if they had betrayed the ideal of mateship. Despite the loss at Gallipoli, Australian and New Zealand soldiers were seen to have displayed great courage, endurance, initiative and discipline. The ANZAC rejected unnecessary restrictions, possessed a sardonic sense of humour, was contemptuous of danger, and proved himself the equal of anyone on the battlefield. Bean encapsulated the meaning of Anzac in his publication ANZAC to Amiens:

ANZAC stood, and still stands, for reckless valor in a good cause, for enterprise, resourcefulness, fidelity, comradeship, and endurance that will never own defeat.

1958 saw the publication of Russel Ward's The Australian Legend. Promoting the egalitarianism of the Australian bush and its permutation into the ANZAC soldiers as the Australian Legend, it soon became a landmark book in Australian historical writing. During the 1960s and 1970s, due to lack of observance of ANZAC Day in general society, the idea of a unique Anzac spirit began to fade. Especially among baby boomers, interest in ANZAC Day reached its lowest point in the aftermath of the anti-war demonstrations over Australian involvement in the Vietnam War. A resurgence in popular commemoration of ANZAC Day in the 1980s (possibly linked to the release of the film Gallipoli) brought the idea of an ANZAC spirit back into prominence in Australian political discourse. There has been an increase in people, especially youth, attending ANZAC Day Dawn Services in Australia and New Zealand, where the ANZAC spirit is often invoked.

== National identity ==
Coming just fourteen years after the Federation of Australia, the Gallipoli campaign was one of the first international events that saw Australians taking part as Australians. As such, it has been seen as a key event in forging a sense of national identity. According to history professor Dr Frank Bongiorno:

The Gallipoli campaign was the beginning of true Australian nationhood. When Australia went to war in 1914, many white Australians believed that their Commonwealth had no history, that it was not yet a true nation, that its most glorious days still lay ahead of it. In this sense the Gallipoli campaign was a defining moment for Australia as a new nation.

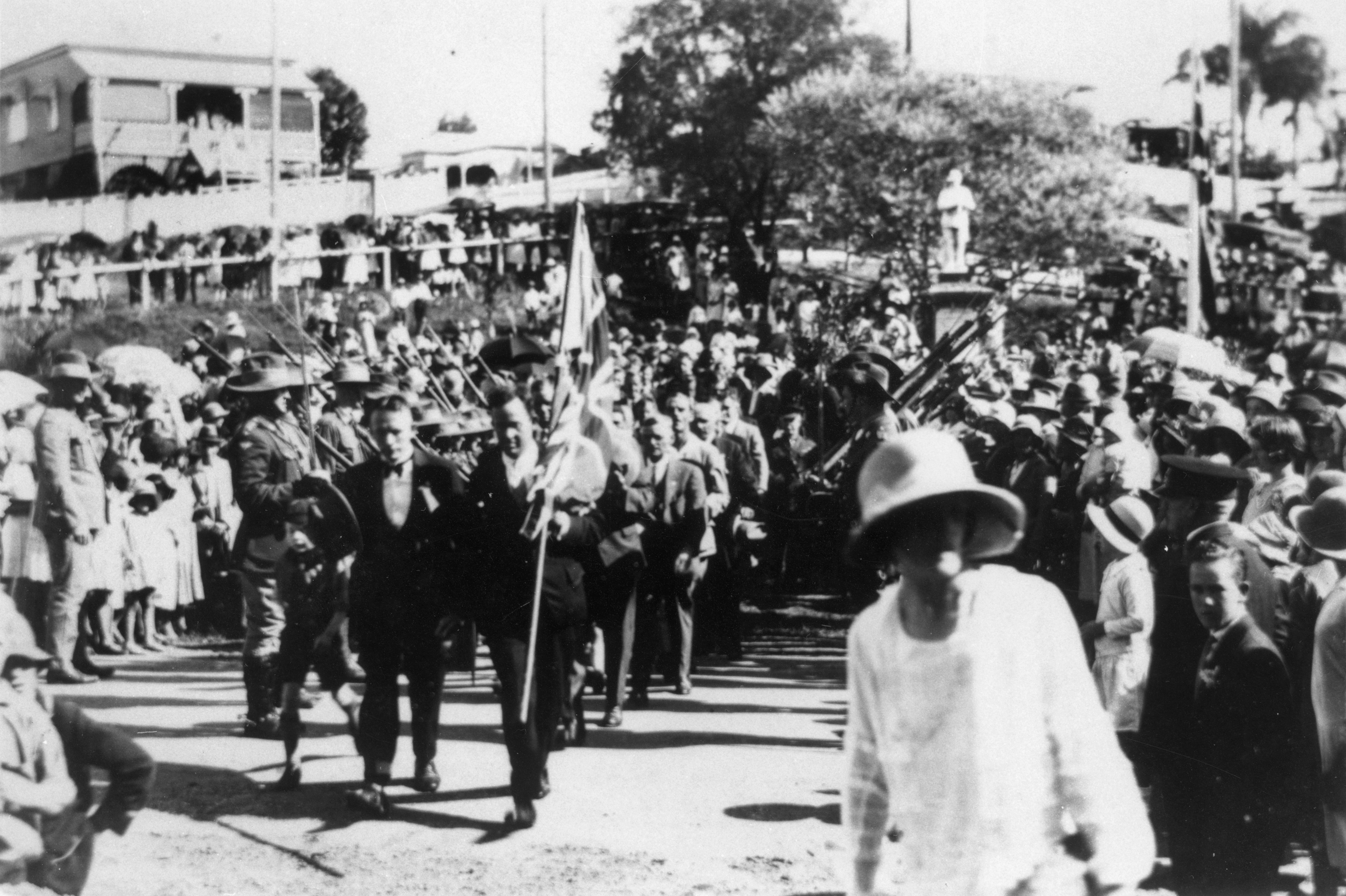
Anzac Day at Manly, Brisbane, Queensland, Australia (1922)

Ernest Scott's influential A Short History of Australia, which remained a standard school text for nearly four decades from 1916 and went through six editions in its author's lifetime, clearly enunciated this concept. In the preface to the book's first edition, Scott linked the European settlement of Australia with the idea of Australia becoming a nation on the battlefields of Gallipoli:

This Short History of Australia begins with a blank space on the map and ends with the record of a new name on the map, that of ANZAC.

Charles Bean also propagated this view, extending the notion to suggest that New Zealand nationhood was also born in the First World War. In 1924 Bean wrote that:

ANZAC Day now belongs to the past and during the war all energy was concentrated on the future but the influence of the Gallipoli Campaign upon the national life of Australia and New Zealand has been far too deep to fade… it was on the 25th of April 1915 that the consciousness of nationhood was born.

The popular belief that the ANZACs, through their spirit, forged Australia's national character, is still today frequently expressed. For example, in 2006 the Governor-General of Australia, Michael Jeffery gave an address in which he said that although the ANZACs lost the campaign they created a lasting identity for Australia:

We are summoned to recall the battle sacrifices of Australian farmers and tally clerks, teachers and labourers and to commemorate outstanding courage and strength of character in the face of sustained adversity... [The campaign] won for us an enduring sense of national identity based on those iconic traits of mateship, courage, compassion and nous.

An extension of this belief is the idea that the ANZACs set an example for future generations of Australians to follow, laying the bedrock of "Australian values". In 2007 the Australian Defence Minister Brendan Nelson articulated this view, stating that the Anzacs "forged values that are ours and make us who we are, reminding us that there are some truths by which we live." Nelson had earlier argued that the story of Simpson and his donkey rescuing wounded men at Gallipoli "represents everything that's at the heart of what it means to be an Australian".

The ANZAC spirit is also sometimes said to be exhibited during Australian civilian crises. For example, the Returned and Services League of Australia states:

The Spirit of the ANZAC continues today in times of hardship such as cyclones, floods and bush fires. At those times Australians come together to rescue one another, to ease suffering, to provide food and shelter, to look after one another, and to let the victims of these disasters know they are not alone.

In New Zealand, the ANZAC spirit is similarly pointed to in some quarters as forming an important component of New Zealand national identity. The New Zealand Government's Ministry of Culture and Heritage states:

New Zealand soldiers distinguished themselves with their courage and skill, establishing an enduring bond with the Australians they fought alongside ... Great suffering was caused to a small country by the loss of so many of its young men. But the Gallipoli campaign showcased attitudes and attributes - bravery, tenacity, practicality, ingenuity, loyalty to King and comrades - that helped New Zealand define itself as a nation, even as it fought unquestioningly on the other side of the world in the name of the British Empire. After Gallipoli, New Zealand had a greater confidence in its distinct identity, and a greater pride in the international contribution it could make. And the mutual respect earned during the fighting formed the basis of the close ties with Australia that continue today.

== Criticism ==
Professor Manning Clark, in his influential work A History of Australia, suggested a contrasting image of the innocent and honourable Anzac soldier. From a range of sources he provided evidence of the soldiers' bad behaviour. For example, he documented that, as recruits, some indulged in sex orgies with an 18-year-old girl at the Broadmeadows camp before being shipped to war. Others confronted police in violent scuffles on the streets of Melbourne. Clark also recorded that in Egypt some soldiers burned the belongings of local people, brawled, got drunk and rioted.

Other scholars such as professor of politics at La Trobe University, Robert Manne, have also questioned the veracity of the Anzac legend, arguing that it is more accurate to describe the concept as a mythology. Dr Dale Blair of Deakin University suggests that:

While traits such as egalitarianism, resourcefulness and initiative are assumed and maintained in the nation's popular memory as a truthful representation, not only of Australia's First World War soldiers, but also, of the national character, they were not sufficiently evident in the experience of the 1st Battalion [at Gallipoli] to justify their advancement as characteristics general to Australian soldiers or the nation.

According to Blair, the official war historian Charles Bean "advanced an idealised view of sacrifice to provide the nation with higher meaning and comfort as compensation for the death of its soldiers". Bean wrote in his diary that the "rule of censorship forbids criticism", and that the war correspondent should avoid "needlessly distressing their families at home". Professor Verity Burgmann of the University of Melbourne argues that the prevailing picture of Anzac and later battles on the Western Front as the highest representation of national unity and shared sacrifice is a misrepresentation, because two conscription referendums were defeated in Australia, and many Australians were totally opposed to any participation in the war. Conflicting reports on the factual events of the landing at Gallipoli on 25 April 1915, continue to surface with conflicting eye-witness reporting. Other sceptics have questioned the idea that Australia's "national character" was forged on the beaches of Gallipoli. In 2008 an editorial in the Sydney Morning Herald stated:

But why should Australians now, 90 years later, be still so eager for some stereotypical reaffirmation of their character? Why the self-doubt? The danger in the transformation - as remembrance replaces memory, and nationalism replaces remembrance - is that the solemnity and the serious purpose of Anzac Day will be lost in an irrelevant search for some kind of essence of Australianness.

Similarly, historian Mark McKenna disputes the notion that the character traits that supposedly define the Anzac spirit are uniquely and demonstrably Australian, arguing that these virtues are in fact universal, being "found in Palestine and Iraq, in Darfur and East Timor, in Afghanistan and Zimbabwe."

Alan Young, a World War II veteran and film maker, presents a different view of the origins of the Anzac tradition in his film Forging the Anzac Tradition, The Untold Story. Young argues that "If Gallipoli is the birthplace of the Anzac acronym, then the Western Front is where the Anzac legend grew up, stood tall and cemented their place in international history; and in our hearts". He points out that five times the number of men died in the "real war" at the Western Front than at the disastrous Gallipoli diversion, yet many Australians know very little of this sacrifice.

Some have also critiqued the masculine underpinnings of the Anzac legend. According to popular notions of the Anzac spirit, the male bonding or mateship becomes the main characteristic in the description of Australianess, yet these characteristics are seen to imply that the true Australian is inevitably and only male. Some feminists have therefore described this notion as being exclusionary and discriminatory, and contend that, as a result, it cannot possibly define what it means to be Australian. Professor Joy Damousi has questioned a view of an Australian national character which relies exclusively on militarism and heroism, arguing that this obscures a more complex, diverse and inclusive understanding of identity.

More broadly, Dr Martin Ball of the University of Melbourne argues that conflating the Anzac spirit with a collective Australian national character exposes an uncritically narrow understanding of Australian history:

The Anzac tradition holds many values for us all to celebrate, but the myth also suppresses parts of Australian history that are difficult to deal with. Anzac is a means of forgetting the origins of Australia. The Aboriginal population is conveniently absent. The convict stain is wiped clean. Postwar immigration is yet to broaden the cultural identity of the population.

A body of scholarship argues that the Anzac legend operates as a national origin myth that displaces and silences the history of frontier violence and dispossession of Aboriginal Australians, with the Australian War Memorial and Anzac Day commemorations centring settler suffering while marginalising the colonial wars fought on Australian soil. Historians including Marilyn Lake, Henry Reynolds, and Mark McKenna have argued that the official promotion of Anzac, particularly under the Howard government during the 1990s "History Wars," coincided with — and helped deflect attention from — emerging public recognition of frontier massacres and Aboriginal dispossession.

== See also ==
- Lions led by donkeys
- Pat Hanna
- Alec Campbell, the longest surviving Australian from Gallipoli
- Bull Allen (soldier)
- Royal New Zealand Returned and Services' Association
- Spirit of the Anzacs
- Pobedobesie

== Sources ==
- Reading list of sources about the ANZAC Spirit from the Australian War Memorial
- "The ANZAC Spirit". Encyclopaedia. Australian War Memorial. Archived from the original on 6 December 2006.
- Ball, Martin Re-Reading Bean's Last Paragraph Australian Historical Studies. Vol 34 No 122 October 2003 pp 248–270
- Burgmann, Verity. Revolutionary industrial unionism : the industrial workers of the world in Australia. Cambridge, UK: Cambridge University Press, 1995. Chapters 12–14.
