= Humphrey McQueen =

Australian scholar (born 1942)

- Born: 26 June 1942 (age 84); Brisbane, Qld, Australia

Academic background
- Education: University of Queensland (B.A (Hons.))
- Influences: Karl Marx, Antonio Gramsci, Manning Clark, Georg Lukacs

Academic work
- Institutions: Australian National University; University of Queensland; University of Tokyo; Literature Board of the Australia Council (1975, 1979–1980, 1998)
- Main interests: Australian history, Marxism, capitalism, slavery
- Notable works: A New Britannia (1970), Social Sketches of Australia (1978)
- Influenced: Elizabeth Humphrys, Clinton Fernandes
- Website: surplusvalue.org.au

Humphrey Dennis McQueen (born 26 June 1942) is an Australian public intellectual, historian, activist, and former Associate Professor in Social and International Relations at the University of Tokyo. Over the course of his career he has written histories, biographies and cultural criticism. McQueen was the pivotal figure in the development of the Australian New Left. His most iconic work, A New Britannia, gained notoriety for challenging the dominant approach to Australian history developed by the Old Left. Although McQueen began his career as an academic at the Australian National University under Manning Clark, his career from the 1990s has been as an independent scholar.

== Early life ==
McQueen was born in Brisbane to a working-class family that was active in the Australian Labor Party. His father was Dinny "Horse" McQueen (1899–1971), a tanner and assistant bookmaker who knew John Wren. Dinny was a long-time member of the Leather and Allied Trades Union who, along with his working wife and McQueen's mother, was recruited to the ALP in the 1950s by a Grouper (although his politics was communistic). McQueen was educated at Marist College Ashgrove and was a contemporary of future PNG prime minister Julius Chan. He joined the ALP at the age of fifteen, and was instrumental in establishing the Queensland Young Labor organisation and was editor of its newsletter. In 1961, McQueen served as the ALP campaign organiser for the seat of Ryan.

== Early career ==
=== Before academia ===
McQueen's first job was as a clerk, third division, at the Department of Social Services in 1960. He left the Commonwealth Public Service soon afterwards to undertake a Bachelor of Arts degree at the University of Queensland where he graduated with Honours degree in 1965. The 'burly, goatee bearded...freethinker' was suspended from the university in 1962 when he reproduced the opinions of Peter Kenny, an Australian Broadcasting Corporation researcher, in 1962. Kenny had argued that the existence of a god was debatable and that homosexuality should be celebrated as much as heterosexuality. The panel appointed to judge the 'bearded' McQueen found him guilty but declined to punish him.

McQueen was an active participant in the anti-Vietnam War movement in Australia, campaigning against conscription as chairman of the Melbourne-based Revolutionary Socialist Group in 1968. His organisational engagement shaped his interest in Maoist and Gramscian theory, influencing his subsequent historical work. He had also been secretary the Vietnam Day Committee in Melbourne when it held a vigil outside the United States Consulate and picketed the Defence Standards Laboratories in 1967. From 1966 to 1969, he was employed as a teacher at Glen Waverley High in Victoria.

=== Academia ===
McQueen's political activism in the 1960s led him to join academia in 1970. His first Marxist critique was a paper in 1967, Which Party for Socialists?, arguing against the ALP. His first academic article came in 1968 when the political economist Bruce McFarlane invited McQueen to write an article in Labour History. The article, Convicts and Rebels, contested the Australian Whig history associated with the Old Left. In the article, McQueen doubted the authenticity of a democratic and egalitarian tradition emanating from Australia's convict history. He challenged the egalitarian aspect of the tradition, highlighting the prominence of racism in convict society.

In 1970, he moved to Canberra, where he taught Australian history as a senior tutor at the Australian National University from 1970 to 1974. He met and befriended the historian, Manning Clark. Soon after starting at the university, McQueen registered his disapproval of the History Department's decision to allow the Faculty of Military Studies at Royal Military College, Duntroon to join ANU (it was affiliated already with UNSW). Although many agreed with McQueen's argument that Duntroon did not allow the right to free thought, fundamental to the liberal conception of a university, the department approved the request.

McQueen's early academic writing was intent on dispelling the approaches to labour history generated by the Australian Old Left, especially Russel Ward's The Australian Legend. McQueen was head-hunted by the political scientist, Henry Mayer, to write a book after he read McQueen's articles "Convicts and Rebels" and "A Race Apart". McQueen wrote A New Britannia, an historical analysis of the emergence and development of the Australian labour movement. It influentially argued that the history of the Australian labour movement, from colonisation to Australian federation (1788–1901), should be understood as an extension of Imperialism within the British Empire. The argument challenged existing account of the labour movement emerging from the Australian Old Left, which had mythologised the nation-building and democratic nature of the movement. In seeking to challenge accounts of Australian history presented in the Old Left, McQueen established the grounds to contest the Whig tradition in Australian scholarship. He identified that British imperialism cannot be separated from the experience of capitalism in Australia, and that Australian identity should be reconsidered in light of the role that racism and Patriarchy had played in development of the Australian labour movement. Together with an application of British New Left theorists, Perry Anderson and Tom Nairn, the approach redefined the nature of Australian historical enquiry, which would prove to be influential in the discipline of history.

Receptions of the book were mixed. Terry Irving in reviewing A New Britannia, highlighted the work's theoretical legacy, but also the need to produce a more developed theoretical engagement. He stated that A New Britannia "Will provoke angry discussion, but I hope it will also provoke the new left to develop the methodology necessary to write a new history". This observation would influence the development of another hallmark of the Australian New Left, Class Structure in Australian History. The Papua New Guinea Post-Courier said, 'Mr Humphrey McQueen is a very angry young man, and there is plenty of justification for this in Australia.' The Canberra Times said, 'In order to encompass such a wide range McQueen has obviously left gaps in his argument, but this matters little... He is concerned to show that the projection of radicalism and nationalism into socialism and anti-imperialism is mythical. This he does, as others have done, but will such attacks ever kill the myth?' Rowan Cahill in Tribune said, 'The trouble is when you dash around frantically from one battlefield to another, like as not you'll end up shooting the wrong people. I believe this is what he has done... McQueen notes that revolutionaries in power have sometimes distorted history in order to stay there; I add the note that in attempting to search out a strategy for coming to power we have to be careful that something similar is not also done.' The journalist W.A. Wood in Tribune attacked the book calling McQueen 'Mr Justice McQueen'.

In 1971, McQueen wrote a review against Christopher Hitchens calling his work on Marx 'acceptable as a fourth year honours essay but it would not be remarkable even as that' and 'it would be useful for a student with no more than an hour to prepare for a tutorial on the subject.' McQueen said of his teaching style, 'History is a study of the development of society — the society as a whole ... the bourgeoisie have isolated and categorized scholarship in such a way as to eliminate the study of the interaction of all social factors, environment, politics and economics... my course is designed to restore history to a study of society as a whole.'

McQueen called for a boycott of the 1972 election because the ALP under Gough Whitlam would be 'even more imperialist in its policy towards South East Asia.' Mungo McCallum said McQueen was 'a middle-class academic putting forward views, on the ideal society but without suggesting realistic proposals to attain it.' McQueen was charged along with 8 undergraduates for encouraging people to defy the draft, but charges was later dropped. Along with his long-time friend, Bruce McFarlane and others, he contributed to a five-part series on Marx aired by ABC Radio Two in 1973 which became a book.

== Independent career ==
By 1978, McQueen had left ANU and had shifted away from his earlier work as he became increasingly influenced by Maoism. This led McQueen to depart from A New Britannia and the Gramscian New Left, a process he described in the 2004 edition. McQueen believed in a fusion between the philosophical and economic Marx, which was a midway between the two competing interpretations of Marxism that had preoccupied radicals since the 1920s. McQueen's fourth book was Social Sketches of Australia (1978), a social history of Australia since the late nineteenth century. Continuing on from early work, Social Sketches was a correction to the secondary source focus of A New Britannia, focusing instead on primary sources and the perspectives of minorities.

McQueen's work since the 1970s has been varied, ranging from historiographical works to art history and the importance of British slavery to the development of capitalism. McQueen's work on George Fife Angas and Peter Goers' commentary of it were criticised by a relative of Angas's for incorrectly stating that he had been a slave owner when there is no evidence of this. McQueen (like Clinton Fernandes) misinterpreted the nature of Angas's agency in collecting compensation awarded to other people.

== Personal life ==
McQueen was married to Judy McQueen.

== Bibliography ==
Year	Title	Publisher
1970	A New Britannia: An Argument Concerning the Social Origins of Australian Radicalism, 1971 ISBN 0-14-021314-7; 2nd edition 1976, 1978, 1980 ISBN 0-14-021904-8; Revised edition 1986 ISBN 0-14-010126-8; 4th edition 2004 ISBN 0-7022-3439-7.	Penguin
1974	Aborigines, Race and Racism, Penguin, 1974, 1976 ISBN 0-14-080774-8	Penguin
1977	Australia's Media Monopolies, Widescope, 1977, 1978,1981 ISBN 0-86932-017-3	Widescope
1978	Social Sketches of Australia: 1888-1975 Penguin, 1978, 1979, 1980, 1986 ISBN 0-14-004435-3	Penguin
1979	The Black Swan of Trespass: The Emergence of Modernist Painting in Australia to 1944, APCOL, 1979 ISBN 0-909188-12-2	APCOL
1983	Gone Tomorrow: Australia into the 1980s, Angus and Roberson, 1983 ISBN 0-207-14610-1	Angus and Roberson
1987	Windows onto Worlds, Report of the Committee to Review Australian Studies in Tertiary Education, Co-authored with Kay Daniels and Bruce Bennett. AGPS, 1987 ISBN 0-642-11866-3	AGPS
1988	Suburbs of the Sacred, Transforming Australian Beliefs and Values, Penguin, 1988, 269pp. ISBN 0-14-010457-7	Penguin
1989	Gallipoli to Petrov: Arguing with Australian History, Allen & Unwin,1989 ISBN 0-86861-199-9 (hardback) ISBN 0-86861-207-3 (paperback)	Allen & Unwin
1991	Social Sketches of Australia: 1888-1988, Penguin, 1991 ISBN 0-14-012232-X	Penguin
1992	Japan to the Rescue, Australian Security Around the Indonesian Archipelago during the American Century, Heinemann, 1992 ISBN 0-85561-402-1	Heinemann
1992	Tokyo World, An Australian Diary, Heinemann, 1992 ISBN 0-85561-412-9	Heinemann
1996	Tom Roberts, Macmillan, 1996 ISBN 0-7329-0835-3	Macmillan Publishers
1997	Suspect History: Manning Clark and the Future of Australian History, Wakefield, 1997 ISBN 1-86254-410-7	Wakefield
1998	Temper Democratic: How Exceptional is Australia?, Wakefield 1998 ISBN 1-86254-466-2	Wakefield
2001	The Essence of Capitalism, The Origins of our Future, Sceptre, 2001 ISBN 0-7336-0940-6; United Kingdom edition, Profile, London, 2001 ISBN 1-86197-098-6; North American edition, Black Rose, Montreal, 2003 ISBN 1-55164-220-4	Black Rose Books
2004	Social Sketches of Australia: 1888 to 2001, University of Queensland Press, 2004, ISBN 0-7022-3440-0	University of Queensland Press
2009	Framework of Flesh: Builders' Labourers Battle for Health and Safety, Ginninderra Press, 2009, ISBN 978-1-74027-545-3	Ginninderra Press
2010	Men of Flowers, with Peter Lyssiotis and Wayne Stock, Masterthief, 2010, ISBN	Fryer Folios
2011	We Built This Country: Builders' Labourers and Their Unions, 1787 to the Future, Ginninderra Press, 2011 ISBN 978-1-74027-697-9	Ginninderra Press

McQueen contributed a chapter entitled "Born free: wage-slaves and chattel-slaves" to Foundational Fictions in South Australian History (2018).
