= Eva Hornung =

Australian writer

Eva Katerina Hornung (born 1964), formerly known as Eva Sallis, is an Australian novelist and poet. She has won several awards, including The Australian/Vogel Literary Award and the Dobbie Literary Award for her first novel Hiam (1997), and the 2010 Prime Minister's Literary Award for fiction for Dog Boy. She was writer-in-residence in 2008, and then a research fellow at the University of Adelaide. She is also co-founder of Australians Against Racism (AAR).

== Early life and education ==
Eva Katerina Hornung was born in Bendigo, Victoria, in 1964.

She has an MA in literature, and completed a PhD in comparative literature from the University of Adelaide in 1996. Hornung lived in Yemen while undertaking research for her PhD.

== Career ==
=== Writing ===
Hornung's first novel, Hiam, won the 1997 The Australian/Vogel Literary Award and the 1999 Dobbie Literary Award. Her second novel was City of Sealions. Her 2003 novel-in-stories, Mahjar won the 2004 Steele Rudd Award. Her 2005 novel Fire Fire told the story of gifted children growing up in a dysfunctional, loving family in 1970s Australia. The Marsh Birds won several awards. Hornung learnt Arabic and travelled to the Middle East for research. All of these novels were published under the name Eva Sallis.

For her 2009 novel Dog Boy, Hornung learnt Russian for nine months in order to undertake research for it, which took four years, including two and a half weeks in Moscow. It won the 2010 Australian Prime Minister's Literary Award for fiction.

Other works include the novels The City of Sealions and Fire Fire, as well as a book of literary criticism on the Arabian Nights, titled Sheherazade through the Looking Glass: the Metamorphosis of the 1001 Nights.

=== Academia ===
Hornung was the University of Adelaide's first Writer-in-Residence in 2008, in Adelaide, South Australia. After completing the residency in June 2008, she worked in a teaching and mentoring position for Creative Writing students at the university. She also presented a graduate seminar and ran a workshop in conjunction with the SA Writers' Centre called "Three Tasks for the Emerging Writer".

As of 2010, she was a research fellow and was supervising students in the Creative Writing program.

== Other activities ==
Hornung is a human rights activist, and co-founded the organisation Australians Against Racism in 2001 along with designer Mariana Hardwick.

In 2007 she presented the Dymphna Clark Memorial Lecture at Manning Clark House in Canberra.

== Personal life ==
Hornung married Roger Sallis, and her early novels were published under the name Eva Sallis. She has a son. After her marriage of 26 years ended sometime before 2009, she reverted to her maiden name, Hornung.

== Works ==
- Hiam (1998; as Eva Sallis)
- Sheherazade Through the Looking Glass: The Metamorphosis of the 'Thousand and One Nights' (Routledge Studies in Middle Eastern Literatures) (1999; as Eva Sallis)
- The City of Sealions (2002; as Eva Sallis)
- Mahjar (2003; as Eva Sallis)
- Fire Fire (2005; as Eva Sallis)
- The Marsh Birds (2006; as Eva Sallis)
- Dog Boy (2009) (as Eva Hornung)
- The Last Garden, The Text Publishing Company, 2017, ISBN 978-1-925498-12-7 (as Eva Hornung)
- The Minstrels (2026; as Eva Hornung)

== Awards ==
The Australian/Vogel Literary Award	Hiam, winner 1997
Dobbie Literary Award	Hiam, winner 1999
Steele Rudd Award	Mahjar, winner 2004
Asher Literary Award	The Marsh Birds, winner 2005
The Commonwealth Writers Prize	The Marsh Birds, shortlisted 2005
The Age Book of the Year	The Marsh Birds, shortlisted 2005
The Prime Minister's Literary Awards	Dog Boy, winner 2010
Voss Literary Prize	The Last Garden, shortlisted 2018
Miles Franklin Award	The Last Garden, shortlisted 2018
