= Anna Clark (Australian historian) =

Australian historian

Anna Clark is an Australian historian, professor and public commentator who is an internationally recognised scholar in Australian history with a particular focus on the history of education and the role of history in everyday life. She is the granddaughter of Manning Clark and Dymphna Clark.

== Education ==
Clark completed her Bachelor of Arts, with honours, at the University of Sydney before completing a graduate certificate in higher education at Monash University. She completed her PhD at the University of Melbourne and her 2006 book Teaching the nation is based from her thesis of the same name.

== Career ==
Clark is based at the Australian Centre for Public History at the University of Technology Sydney where she teaches Australian history and historiography. Since 2008 she has been an Australian Research Council future fellow.

== Selected publications ==
- MacIntrye, Stuart; Clark, Anna (2004), The History Wars, Melbourne University Press, Carlton, Vic
- Clark, Anna (2006), Teaching the nation : politics and pedagogy in Australian history, Melbourne University Publishing, ISBN 978-0-522-85234-9
- Clark, Anna (2008), History's children : history wars in the classroom, University of NSW Press, ISBN 978-0-86840-863-7
- Clark, Anna (2016), Private lives, public history, Melbourne University Publishing, ISBN 978-0-522-86895-1
- Clark, Anna, ed. (2019), The knowledge solution / Australian history, Melbourne University Press, ISBN 978-0-522-87543-0
- Clark, Anna (2022), Making Australian History, Vintage Books, ISBN 978-1-76089-852-6
- Clark, Anna (2023), The catch: Australia's love affair with fishing (Revised ed.), Vintage Books Australia, ISBN 978-1-76134-220-2
