= Manning Clark =

Australian historian (1915–1991)

Manning Clark AC FAHA
- Clark in his study, circa 1988
- Born: Charles Manning Hope Clark; 3 March 1915; Sydney, New South Wales, Australia
- Died: 23 May 1991 (aged 76); Canberra, Australian Capital Territory, Australia
- Spouse: Dymphna Clark
- Children: Andrew, Axel, Benedict, Katerina, Rowland, Sebastian
- Awards: FAW (Vic) Moomba Book Award (1969); Henry Lawson Arts Award (1969); Australian Literature Society Gold Medal (1970); The Age Non-Fiction Award (1974); Companion of the Order of Australia (1975); Douglas Stewart Prize for Non-Fiction (1979); Australian of the Year (1980)

Academic background
- Education: Melbourne Grammar School
- Alma mater: University of Melbourne; University of Oxford
- Influences: Thomas Carlyle; Edward Gibbon; Thomas Macaulay

Academic work
- Institutions: Australian National University (1960–1974); University of Melbourne (1944–1960)
- Notable students: Frank Crean; Geoffrey Serle; Ken Inglis; Geoffrey Blainey; Helen Hughes; Humphrey McQueen
- Main interests: Australian history
- Notable works: A History of Australia
- Influenced: Geoffrey Serle; Lyndall Ryan

Charles Manning Hope Clark (3 March 1915 – 23 May 1991) was an Australian historian and the author of the best-known general history of Australia, his six-volume A History of Australia, published between 1962 and 1987. He has been described as "Australia's most famous historian", but his work has also been the target of criticism, particularly from conservatives and classical liberals.

== Early life ==
Clark was born in Sydney on 3 March 1915, the son of the Reverend Charles Clark, an English-born Anglican priest from a working-class background (he was the son of a London carpenter), and Catherine Hope, who came from an old Australian establishment family. On his mother's side he was a descendant of the Reverend Samuel Marsden, the "flogging parson" of early colonial New South Wales. Clark had a difficult relationship with his mother, who never forgot her superior social origins, and came to identify her with the Protestant middle class he so vigorously attacked in his later work. Charles held various curacies in Sydney including St Andrew's Cathedral, Sydney, and St John's, Ashfield, where Catherine was a Sunday School teacher. The family moved to Melbourne when Clark was a child and lived in what one biographer describes as "genteel poverty" on the modest income of an Anglican vicar.

Clark's happiest memories of his youth were of the years 1922–1924, when his father was the vicar of Phillip Island, south-east of Melbourne, where he acquired the love of fishing and of cricket, which he retained for the rest of his life. He was educated at state schools at Cowes and Belgrave, and then at Melbourne Grammar School, where he was a boarder in School House. Here, as an introspective boy from a modest background, he suffered from ridicule and bullying, and acquired a lifelong dislike for the sons of the Melbourne upper class who had tormented him and others at this school. His later school years, however, were happier. He discovered a love of literature and the classics, and became an outstanding student of Greek, Latin and history (British and European). In 1933 he was equal dux of the school.

As a result, Clark won a scholarship to Trinity College at the University of Melbourne. Here he thrived, gaining firsts in ancient history and British history and captaining the college cricket team. In his second year he gained firsts in constitutional and legal history and in modern political institutions. One of his teachers, W. Macmahon Ball, one of Australia's leading political scientists of this period, made a deep impression on him. By this time he had lost his Christian faith but was not attracted to any of the secular alternatives on offer. His writings as a student explicitly rejected both socialism and communism. At this point Clark's political views continuously shifted from liberalism to a type of moderate socialism. His favourite writers at this time were Fyodor Dostoyevsky and T. S. Eliot, and his favourite historian was the conservative Thomas Carlyle. In terms of his evolving political views, a few years later, around 1944, Clark became a socialist of moderate views, a political position he maintained for the rest of his adult life, with political sympathies broadly placed on the Left and with the Australian Labor Party.

In 1937 Clark won a scholarship to Balliol College, Oxford, and left Australia in August 1938. Among his teachers at Oxford were Hugh Trevor-Roper (a conservative), Christopher Hill (at that time a communist) and A. J. P. Taylor (a moderate socialist). He won acceptance by excelling at cricket – playing for the Oxford XI and competing alongside Edward Heath and Roy Jenkins. He began a master of arts thesis on Alexis de Tocqueville (he finally submitted it in 1947, and it was published in 2000). Though basically sympathetic towards de Tocqueville's liberalism, Clark wrote that his political vision for a just society was flawed by his ignorance of the misery of the masses and by his unwillingness to consider force to ensure justice.

At Oxford in the late 1930s he shared the Left's horror of fascism – which he had seen first-hand during a visit to Nazi Germany in 1938 – but was not attracted to the communism which was prevalent among undergraduates at the time. His exposure to Nazism and Fascism in 1938 made him more pessimistic and sceptical about the state of European civilisation. However, he was not attracted to the Left's emancipatory process of socialist revolution and favoured, instead, a capitalist, social democratic and democratic socialist approach. At Oxford also he suffered the social snubs commonly experienced by "colonials" at that time, which was apparently the source of his lifelong dislike of the English. In 1939 in Oxford he married Dymphna Lodewyckx, the daughter of a Flemish intellectual and a formidable scholar in her own right, with whom he had six children.

== Academic career ==
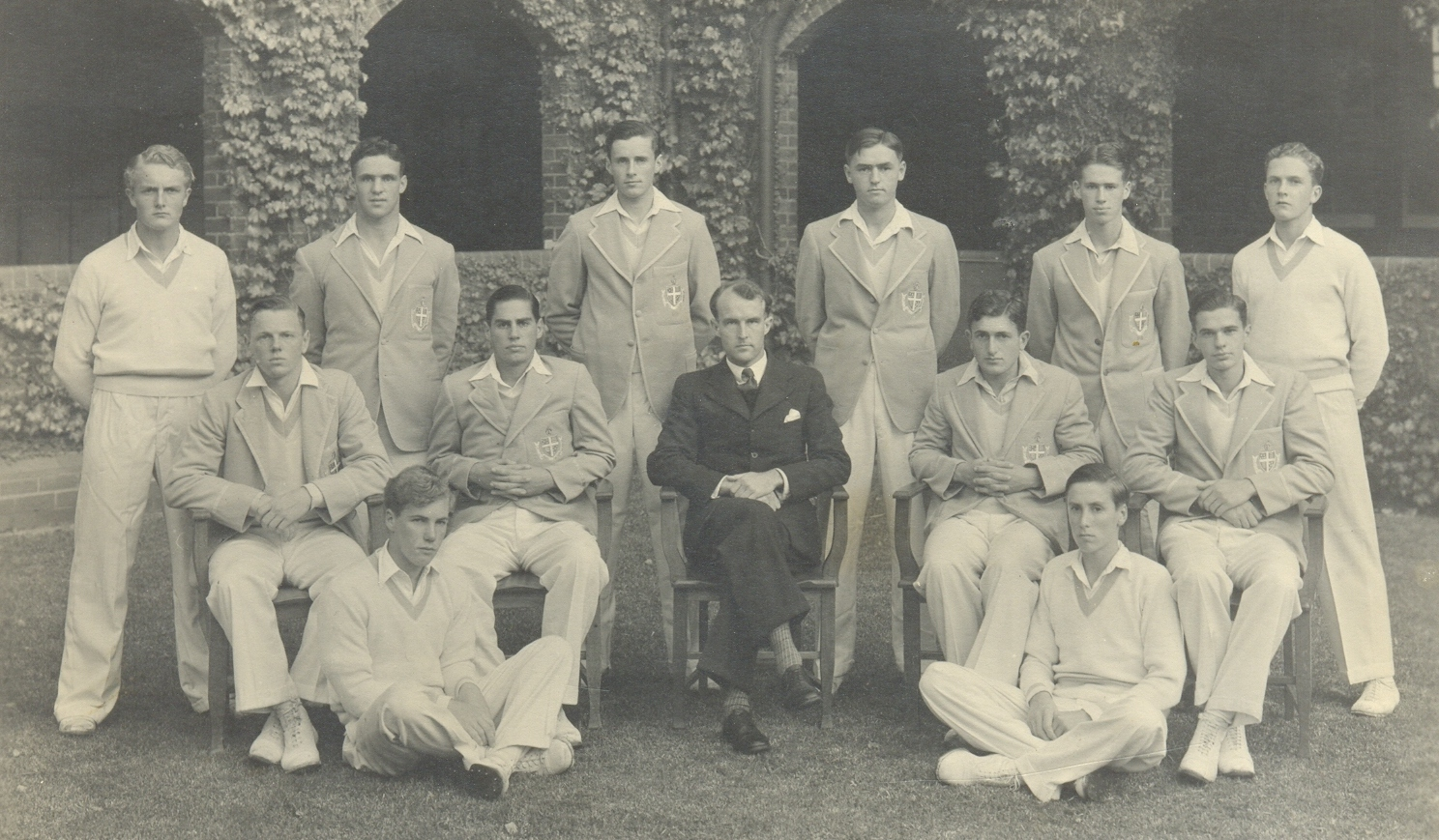
Manning Clark as coach of the Geelong Grammar First XI, 1941

When World War II broke out in September 1939, Clark was exempted from military service on the grounds of his mild epilepsy. He supported himself while finishing his thesis by teaching history and coaching cricket teams at Blundell's School, a public school at Tiverton in Devonshire, England. Here he discovered a gift for teaching. In June 1940 he suddenly decided to return to Australia, abandoning his unfinished thesis, but was unable to get a teaching position at an Australian university due to the wartime decline in enrolments. Instead he taught history at Geelong Grammar School, and also coached the school's First XI – a highly prestigious appointment. Among those he taught were Keith Dunstan, Rupert Murdoch and Stephen Murray-Smith.

At Geelong, he published two papers. The first, "The Dilemma of the French Intelligentsia", concerned why French Catholic intellectuals such as Charles Maurras had supported the Vichy regime. Clark argued that Maurras and other French Catholic intellectuals had been reluctant collaborators, driven to support Vichy out of a dissatisfaction with bourgeois conservatism in France and a fear of the masses propelled by memories of the French Revolution. In his second paper entitled "France and Germany", Clark offered up a comparative study of the intelligentsia of Germany and France, asking why the former nation gave birth to National Socialism while the latter nation had to be defeated to become Nazi. Clark offered up what would today be called the Sonderweg interpretation, arguing that in the 19th century the majority of French intellectuals had by and large accepted liberalism, rationalism and the values of liberté, égalité, fraternité whereas the majority of German intellectuals by contrast had embraced conservatism, emotionalism, and a vision of a hierarchical society ruled by an autocratic elite. Clark noted that at the beginning of the 20th century, the most famous French intellectual was the writer Émile Zola who had been a leading Dreyfusard in the Dreyfus affair as he maintained justice must apply to all French people. By contrast, Clark noted that the most famous German intellectual in the same time period was the English-born Houston Stewart Chamberlain, the "Evangelist of Race", whose theories divided the world into a racial hierarchy with the Germanic Aryan race as the herrenvolk ("master race"). While at Geelong he began systematically to read Australian history, literature and criticism for the first time. The result was his first publication on an Australian theme, an open letter to the 19th-century Australian writer "Tom Collins", on the subject of mateship, which appeared in the literary magazine Meanjin.

In 1944 Clark returned to Melbourne University to finish his master's thesis, an essential requirement if he was to gain a university post. He supported himself by tutoring politics, and later in the year he was finally appointed to a lectureship in politics. The acting head of the Politics Department at this time was Ian Milner, who soon left to become an Australian diplomat. Years later it was revealed that Milner had been a secret communist and Soviet agent. Clark's brief friendship with Milner at this time has been seized on as evidence of Clark's supposed communist sympathies, but it is unlikely that Clark knew anything about Milner's covert activities. In late 1945 he transferred to the History Department, as a permanent lecturer in Australian History. With the encouragement of Max Crawford (head of the History Department from 1937 to 1970), he taught the university's first full-year course in Australian history. Among his students were Frank Crean (later Deputy Prime Minister), Geoffrey Blainey, Bruce Grant, Geoffrey Serle, Ken Inglis and Ian Turner (the latter five all future historians of note), Helen Hughes, and Peter Ryan, later Clark's publisher. During this time he began thoroughly researching the archives in Melbourne and Sydney for the documentary evidence on Australia's early history. He also developed a reputation as a heavy drinker, and was a well-known figure in the pubs of nearby Carlton. (In the 1960s he gave up drink and was a total abstainer for the rest of his life.)

Clark later stated that it was reading the novelists, poets and playwrights during this period such as Joseph Furphy, James McAuley, Douglas Stewart, Henry Lawson, and D.H. Lawrence that led to his "discovery of Australia" as he became convinced that the story of Australia had not been properly told by historians, and the Australians had a past to be proud of. Clark was also disappointed by the treatment afforded by historians of "dinkum" Australians (i.e. ordinary Australians, so-called because they spoke the "dinkum" variety of English) with their values of mateship, egalitarianism and anti-elitism with the "dinkum" people being portrayed as almost a national disgrace. Clark argued it was time for Australian intellectuals to stop treating Great Britain as the model of excellence to which Australians should strive, writing that Australia should be treated as an entity in its own right. However, Clark himself was critical of "dinkum" Australians, albeit from another direction, as he maintained that values such as mateship were mere "comforters" that helped to make life in colonial Australia with its harsh environment more bearable, and failed to provide a means to fundamentally change society. Clark stated that he did not know what were the new values that Australian society needed, but that historians had the duty to start such a debate. A major problem for Australian historians in the 1940s was that most of the primary sources relating to the colonial period were held in archives in Britain, making research expensive and time-consuming. Starting in 1946, Clark together with L.J. Pryor collected documentary material relating to the founding of the colony of New South Wales in 1788, the transportation of convicts to the penal colony and the squatters living illegally in the bush, with the aim of publishing them to make them more accessible to historians.

In 1948 Clark was promoted to Senior Lecturer, and was well set for a lifelong career at Melbourne University. But as the Cold War set in, he began to find the intellectual climate of Melbourne uncomfortable. In 1947 F.L. Edmunds, a Liberal member of the Victorian Legislative Assembly, launched an attack on "Communist infiltration" of the university, naming Crawford (a largely apolitical liberal) and Jim Cairns, an economics lecturer and a left-wing Labor Party member. Clark was not named, but when he went on the radio to defend his colleagues, he was attacked as well. Thirty of Clark's students signed a letter affirming that he was a "learned and sincere teacher" of "irreproachable loyalty". The Melbourne University branch of the Communist Party said that Clark was "a reactionary" and no friend of theirs.

In July 1949, Clark moved to Canberra to take up the post of professor of history at the Canberra University College (CUC), which was at that time a branch of Melbourne University, and which in 1960 became the School of General Studies of the Australian National University (ANU). He lived in Canberra, then still a "bush capital" in a rural setting, for the rest of his life. From 1949 to 1972 Clark was professor of history, first at CUC and then at ANU. In 1972 he was appointed to the new post of professor of Australian history, which he held until his retirement in 1974. He then held the title of emeritus professor until his death.

During the 1950s Clark pursued a conventional academic career while teaching history in Canberra. In 1950 he published the first of two volumes of Select Documents in Australian History (Vol. 1, 1788–1850; Vol. 2, 1851–1900, appeared in 1955). These volumes made an important contribution to the teaching of Australian history in schools and universities by placing a wide selection of primary sources, many never before published, in the hands of students. The publication of the first volume of Select Documents in 1950 attracted much media attention at the time, being hailed as the beginning of a new period of Australian historiography. The documents were accompanied by extensive annotation and commentaries by Clark, and his critics now regard this as his best work, before the onset of what they see as his later decline. At this stage of his career Clark published as C. M. H. Clark, but he was always known as Manning Clark, and published his later works under that name.

During this period Clark was regarded as a conservative, both politically and in his approach to Australian history. In an influential 1954 lecture published under the title "Rewriting Australian history", he rejected the nostalgic radical nationalism of "Old Left" historians such as Brian Fitzpatrick, Russel Ward, Vance Palmer and Robin Gollan, which, he said, tended to see Australian history as merely a "manure heap" from which the coming golden age of socialism would arise. He attacked many of the shibboleths of the nationalist school, such as the idealisation of the convicts, bushrangers and pioneers. The rewriting of Australian history, he said, "will not come from the radicals of this generation because they are tethered to an erstwhile great but now excessively rigid creed". There were a number of similar comments in his annotation of the Select Documents. The diggers of Eureka, for example, were not revolutionaries, but aspiring capitalists; the dominant creed of the 1890s was not socialism, but fear of Asian immigration. Although these views were seen as conservative at the time, they were later taken up with greater force by the Marxist historian Humphrey McQueen in his 1970 book A New Britannia.

The orthodox left was sharply critical of Clark during this period. When Paul Mortier reviewed the second volume of Select Documents in the Communist Party newspaper Tribune, he criticised Clark for his lack of Marxist understanding: "Professor Clark rejects class struggle as the key to historical development: he expressed grave doubts about whether there has been any real progress: and he has no good word for historians who pay tribute to the working people for their contributions to Australia's traditions," he wrote.

In 1962 Clark contributed an essay to Peter Coleman's book Australian Civilisation, in which he argued that much of Australian history could be seen as a three-sided struggle between Catholicism, Protestantism and secularism, a theme which he continued to develop in his later work. In his introduction Coleman wrote:

"The post-war Counter-Revolution [in Australian historiography] involves so many influences that it would be ridiculous to attribute it to the influence of any one man, but nevertheless the influence of Manning Clark has been of the greatest importance. By his questioning of the orthodox assumptions he did more than anyone else to release historians from the prison of the radical interpretation and to begin the systematic study of the neglected themes in our history, especially of religion".

At this time also Clark was close to James McAuley, founder of the conservative literary-political magazine Quadrant. McAuley persuaded him to become a member of Quadrant's initial editorial advisory board. Clark was, however, never fully identified with political conservatism. In 1954 he was one of a group of intellectuals who publicly criticised the position of the Menzies government on the war in French Indo-China, and as a result was attacked as one of the communist fellow-travellers in the House of Representatives by the outspoken right-wing parliamentarian Bill Wentworth. As a result, he was placed under surveillance by Australia's domestic intelligence organisation, ASIO, who over the years compiled a large file of trivia and gossip about him, without ever discovering anything in his activities that posed a risk to "national security".

== A History of Australia ==
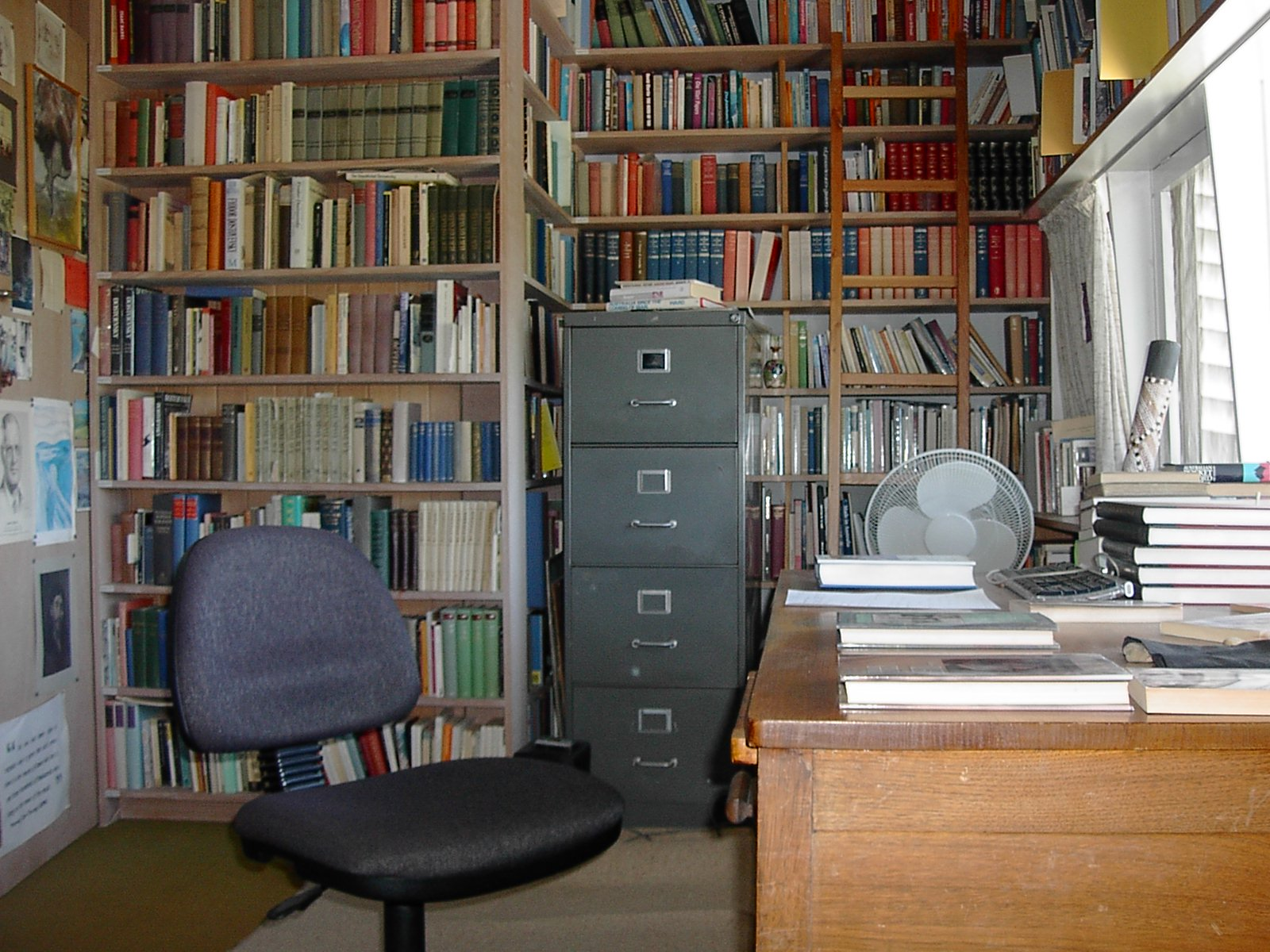
Manning Clark's desk in his Canberra home, where he wrote the six volumes of A History of Australia

In the mid-1950s Clark conceived a new project: a large multi-volume history of Australia, based on the documentary sources but giving expression to Clark's own ideas about the meaning of Australian history. In late 1955, he received a research grant from the Rockefeller Foundation to study the first visits by Europeans to Australia in the 17th century. He took leave from Canberra in 1956 and visited Jakarta, Burma and various cities in India, fossicking in museums and archives for documents and maps relating to the discovery of Australia by the Dutch in the 17th century, and also the possible 'discovery' of Australia by the Chinese or the Portuguese. He then visited London, Oxford and the Netherlands, where he combed through the archives for more documents relating to the Dutch explorers and the founding of New South Wales in 1788 – Dymphna Clark did most of the research work in the Dutch archives. An immediate result of this research was Sources of Australian History (Oxford University Press 1957).

During his time in London, the nature of the project radically changed as he recalled: "It was going to be very academic, very careful, very much a 'Yes' and 'No' performance, with genuflexions in the direction of Mr. 'Dry-as-Dust', and anxious looking over the shoulder at people I liked, hoping they were not as bored or lost as I was. It was all hopeless, lifeless, meaningless and false. I was in England, writing about Australia, writing about a country I did not really know, and about a country which I had a love-hate relationship". After some reflection, Clark decided that what he really wanted to do was write a vivid narrative of Australian history with a focus on the impact on the Australian environment on European colonists in the 18th and 19th centuries, marking the genesis of the book series that became A History of Australia.

On his return to Australia, Clark began to write A History of Australia, which was originally envisioned as a two-volume work, with the first volume extending to the 1860s and the second volume ending in 1939. As Clark began to write, however, the work expanded dramatically, both in size and conception. The first volume of History, subtitled "from the earliest times to the Age of Macquarie" appeared in 1962, and five more volumes, taking the story down to 1935, appeared over the next 26 years. In his autobiographical memoir A Historian's Apprenticeship published after his death, Clark recalled that his models were Carlyle, Edward Gibbon and T. B. Macaulay – two conservatives and a Whig – and that he was inspired by the belief that "the story of Australia was a bible of wisdom both for those now living and, I hoped, for those to come after us". By this time he had rejected all the notions of progressive or Marxist historiography: "I was beginning to see Australian history and indeed all history as a tragedy. Failure was the fate of the individual: success could be the fate of society. If that was a contradiction, I could only reply that it was but one of the many contradictions we must accept as soon as we can as part of the human condition".

The dominant theme of the early volumes of Clark's history was the interplay between the harsh environment of the Australian continent and the European values of the people who discovered, explored and settled it in the 18th and 19th centuries. In common with most Australians of his generation, he had little knowledge of, or interest in, the culture of indigenous Australians, though this changed in his later life. He saw Catholicism, Protestantism and the Enlightenment as the three great contending influences in Australian history. He was chiefly interested in colourful, emblematic individuals and the struggles they underwent to maintain their beliefs in Australia; men like William Bligh, William Wentworth, John MacArthur and Daniel Deniehy. His view was that most of his heroes had a "tragic flaw" that made their struggles ultimately futile.

Clark largely ignored the 20th century historiographic preoccupation with economic and social history, and completely rejected the Marxist stress on class and class struggle as the driving force of social progress. He was also not much interested in detailed factual history, and as the History progressed it became less and less based in empirical research and more and more a work of literature: an epic rather than a history. Clark's colourful writing style with its allusions to the Bible, apocalyptic imagery, and a focus on the psychological struggles within individuals was often criticised by historians, but made him popular with the public. Clark argued that the defining struggle between Protestantism, Catholicism and the Enlightenment world views ultimately ended not with the triumph of the "lucky country", but rather a spiritual decline into a "kingdom of nothingness" and an "age of ruins", as Australians became in Clark's view a nation of materialistic petty, petit-bourgeois property owners. Despite his pessimistic conclusions, Clark wrote he still had hope for Australia's future, writing:

"Australians have liberated themselves from the fate of being second-rate Europeans and have begun to contribute to the never-ending conversation of humanity on the meaning of life and the means of wisdom and understanding. So far no one has described the phoenix that will arise from the ashes of an age of ruins. No one has risked prophesying whether an age of ruins will be the prelude to the coming of the barbarians or to taking a seat at the great banquet of life. The life-deniers and the straiteners have been swept into the dustbin of human history. Now is the time for the life-affirmers and the enlargers to show whether they have anything to say, whether they have any food for the great hungers of humanity".

His inattention to factual detail became notorious, and was noted even in the first volume, which drew a critical review from Malcolm Ellis titled "History without facts". Ellis, who had a history of personal hostility with Clark, was the first of many critics who took Clark to task for too much speculation about what was in the hearts of men and too little description of what they actually did. The historian A. G. L. Shaw, who had been best man at Clark's wedding, said that while most of Clark's errors were trivial, together they created "a sense of mistrust in the work as a whole". There was also criticism that Clark relied too heavily on his own interpretation of primary sources and ignored the secondary literature. In contrast, many historians, including Max Crawford, Bede Nairn, Kathleen Fitzpatrick and Allan W. Martin the official biographer of Robert Menzies, praised the book.

The History thus met a mixed critical response – "praise, misgivings and puzzlement in varying proportions" – but a generally positive public one. Most readers warmed to Clark's great gift for narrative prose and the depiction of individual character, and were not troubled by the comments of academic critics on his factual inaccuracies or their doubts about his historiographic theories. The books sold extremely well and were a major earner for Melbourne University Press (MUP) and its director, Peter Ryan. Even critics who found fault with the History as history admired it as literature. In The Age, Stuart Sayers hailed it as "a major work, not only of scholarship... but also of Australian literature". Some reviewers complained that Clark was "too pre-occupied with tragic vision" or condemned his "Biblical and slightly mannered style", but "recognised that Clark's very excesses gave the History its profundity and distinctive insight". The respected historian John La Nauze, author of a highly regarded biography of Alfred Deakin, wrote that the importance of Clark's work "lies not in the apocalyptic vision of our history... which I do not understand, and which I am sure I would disagree with if I did," but in "the particular flashes of interpretation" which gave "a new appearance to familiar features". Alastair Davidson stated in a review in the magazine Dissent in 1968: "The astonishing savaging of volume one of A History of Australia, when it appeared in 1962, seems almost symbolic. What is important is that such pettiness did not harm such as Gibbon and Taine. Manning Clark will not go into the dustbin of history because of Ellis' quibbling about the precise time this or that event happened. Nor will McManners's more gentle questioning about whether he had really understood the nature of the Enlightenment correctly really be important. Great history is not determined by the precision of the facts it contains. What will decide this is the meaningfulness of the vision of Man which it has".

== Meeting Soviet Man ==
In 1958, Clark visited the Soviet Union for three weeks as a guest of the Soviet Union of Writers, accompanied by the Communist writer Judah Waten and the Queensland poet James Devaney, a Catholic of moderate views. The delegation visited Moscow and Leningrad, and Clark also visited Prague on his way home. While Waten wanted him to admire the achievements of the Soviet state, Clark was more interested in attending the Bolshoi Ballet, the Dostoyevsky Museum and the St Sergius Monastery at Zagorsk. Clark annoyed both Waten and his Soviet hosts by asking questions about Boris Pasternak, the dissident Soviet writer who was in trouble for having his novel Doctor Zhivago published in the West. Nevertheless, he was impressed by the material progress of the country after the devastation of World War II and by the limited political liberalisation which was taking place under Nikita Khrushchev.

On his return he wrote a series of articles for the liberal news-magazine Nation, which were later published in booklet form as Meeting Soviet Man (Angus and Robertson 1960). This work later became "exhibit A" for the charge that Clark was a communist, a communist sympathiser or, at best, hopelessly naive about communism. In it he gave ammunition to his enemies by denying that millions of people had died during Joseph Stalin's collectivisation of agriculture. On the other hand, he was scathing about the cultural dreariness of the Soviet Union and about the greed and philistinism of the Soviet bureaucracy. Although he criticised Soviet society for the "greyness" of everyday life and the suppression of religion, he praised the Soviet state's ability to provide for the material needs of the people. His comment that Vladimir Lenin stood on a par with Jesus as one of the great men of all time was later often quoted against him.

At the time, however, the book was not universally seen as pro-Soviet. Writing in Tribune, Waten denounced it as misleading and "littered with half-truths and anti-Soviet clichés". Clark's son recalls:

"The irony is that it was during the time of publication that my father's relationship with Judah was most strained, and the point of conflict was over the content of the book. Judah attacked Meeting Soviet Man for being too sympathetic to the west, and too critical of the Soviet Union. I recall one particularly tense meeting at Judah's house. To lighten up the atmosphere he spent the first hour regaling us with colorful stories about the professional boxing bouts he attended in Melbourne's old Festival Hall. Then he and my father retired to another room to talk the issue out. I could tell from the grim expressions as they emerged that there had been no resolution of their differences".

Nevertheless, Meeting Soviet Man marked the beginning of Clark's reputation as a left-winger, something of which his work to that point had given no indication. James McAuley, hitherto a close friend, called the book "shoddy," and Donald Horne, then a conservative and editor of The Bulletin, called it "superficial" and showing "too much sentimental goodwill" towards the Soviet Union.

It remains unclear what Clark's political views actually were, although it is clear that from the mid-1960s onwards he identified the Australian Labor Party as the party of progress and Australian independence, and particularly admired Gough Whitlam (who became Leader of the ALP Opposition in 1967 and Prime Minister five years later) as the leader Australia had been looking for ever since the death of John Curtin in 1945. Stephen Holt wrote in his study A Short History of Manning Clark: "Though never belonging to a party, he was intensely political, embodying the conflicting loyalties of inter-war Australia... He disturbed conservative and conventional opinion without himself becoming an unswerving left-wing believer". Peter Craven disagreed: "I'm not sure that he [Holt] is right that Clark was an intensely political figure. He seems in some respects to have been more of a political agnostic whose personal mythology became conflated with the dreary mechanisms of celebrity in this country so that both sides were ready to plague him".

Whatever his real views, Clark enjoyed praise and celebrity, and since he was now getting it mainly from the left he tended to play to the gallery in his public statements. "He was more popular and newsworthy, 'the best guru in the business,' as Geoff Serle put it in 1974". There is, however, no evidence that Clark had any real sympathy with Communism as an ideology or as a system of government. He visited the Soviet Union again in 1970 and in 1973, and he again expressed his admiration for Lenin as a historical figure. But in 1971 he took part in a demonstration outside the Soviet Embassy in Canberra against the Soviet persecution of the author Aleksandr Solzhenitsyn, and in 1985 he again took part in an anti-Soviet demonstration, this time in support of the Polish trade union Solidarity. In 1978 he told an interviewer that he was not an advocate of revolution. He was torn, he said, between "radicalism and pessimism," a pessimism based on doubts that socialism would really make things any better.

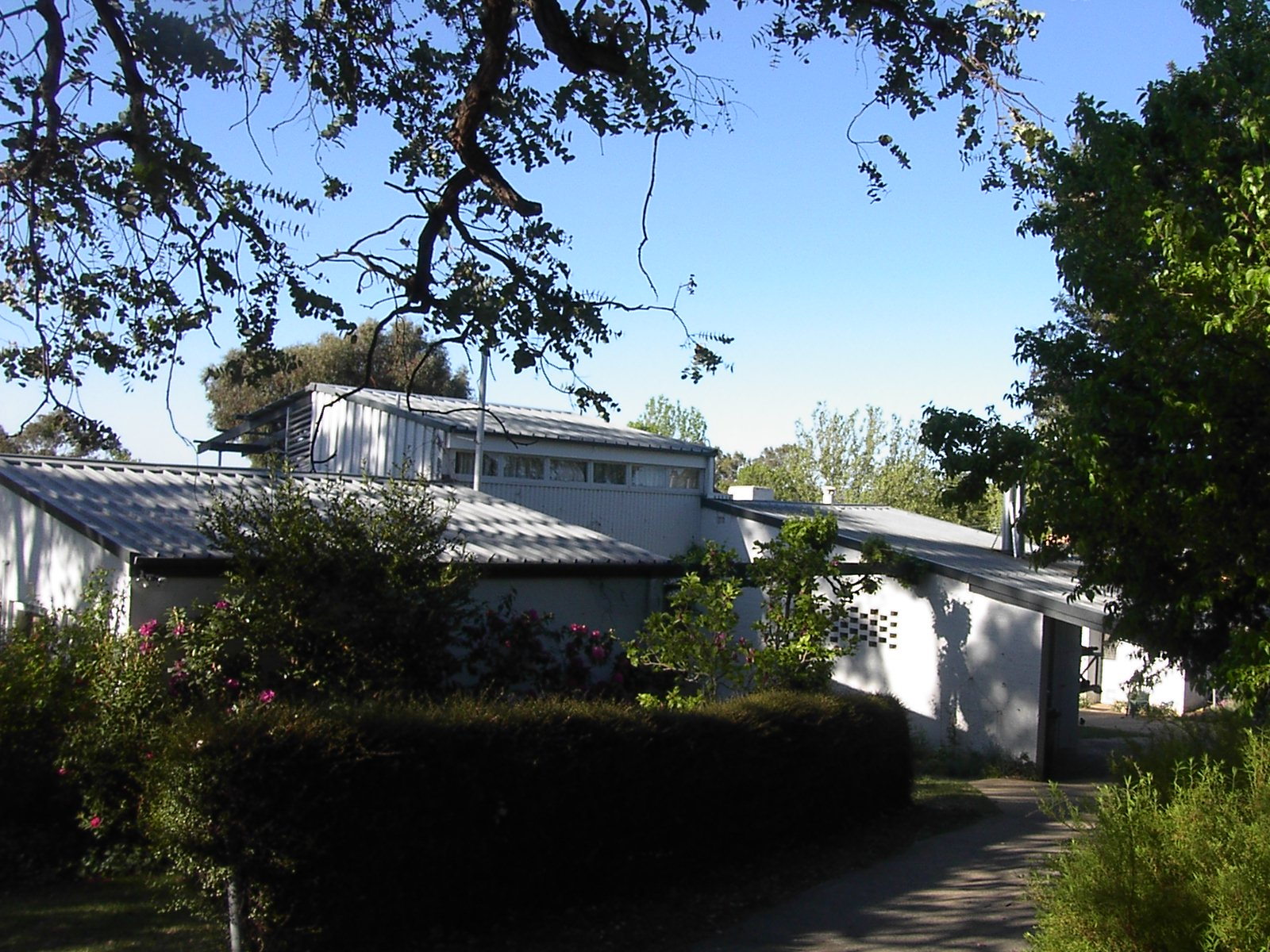
Manning and Dymphna Clark's home in Forrest, Canberra, where they lived from 1955 until Manning's death in 1991 and Dymphna's in 2000. The house is now open to the public.

== A History of Australia: later volumes ==
Volumes II and III of the History broadly followed the path prepared by Clark's earlier work and ideas. Volume II (launched in 1968) took the story to the 1830s, and dwelt on the conflicts between the colonial governors and their landowning allies with the emerging first generation of native-born white Australians, many of them the children of convicts. It prompted Russel Ward to praise Clark as "the greatest historian, living or dead, of Australia". Even Leonie Kramer, doyenne of conservative intellectuals and closely associated with the Quadrant group, named Volume II as her "book of the year". The appearance of Volume III in 1973 aroused little controversy – commentators of all political views apparently felt there was nothing new to say about Clark's work.

By the time Volume IV appeared in 1979, however, the tone of both his work and of the critical response to it had changed greatly. (This process was aided by Clark's retirement from teaching in 1975 – he no longer faced the demands of a professional academic career and was free to write what he liked.) Although Clark had rejected the nostalgic nationalism of the "Old Left" historians, he shared much of their contempt for the old Anglo-Australian upper class, whose stronghold was the "Melbourne establishment" where Clark was raised and educated. His earlier preoccupation with the clash of European belief systems imported into Australia in the 18th century faded, and was replaced by a focus on what Clark saw as the conflict between "those who stood for 'King and Empire' and those who stood for 'the Australian way of life and the Australian dream,' between 'the Old Dead Tree and the Young Tree Green'". While this was a focus more relevant to the history of Australia in the late 19th and 20th centuries, it was also a much more politically contentious one, and Clark's undisguised contempt for the "Old Dead Tree" of the Anglo-Australian middle class fuelled the view that he was now writing polemic rather than history.

Writing in the heated political atmosphere of Australia in the 1970s, Clark came to see Robert Menzies (Liberal Prime Minister 1949–1966) as the representative of the "old" Australia, and to see Whitlam as the hero of a new progressive Australia. Clark campaigned for Whitlam in the 1972 and 1974 elections, and was outraged by his dismissal by the Governor-General, Sir John Kerr, in 1975, after which he wrote an article for Meanjin called "Are we a nation of bastards?". These views increasingly coloured his writing, and were notable in the last three volumes of the History. Volume IV of the History, launched in 1978, was notably strident in its attacks on Anglo-Australian conservatism, materialism, philistinism and "groveldom". It attracted the now familiar range of critical comment: criticism from conservatives, praise from the left (although Marxists like Connell and McQueen continued to complain that Clark was really a "bourgeois historian").

In 1975, the Australian Broadcasting Commission invited Clark to give the 1976 Boyer Lectures, a series of lectures which were broadcast and later published as A Discovery of Australia. The Boyer lectures allowed Clark to describe many of the core ideas of his published work and indeed his own life in characteristic style. "Everything a historian writes," he stated for example, "should be a celebration of life, a hymn of praise to life. It should come up from inside a man who knows all about that horror of the darkness when a man returns to the dust from whence he came, a man who has looked into the heart of that great darkness, but has both a tenderness for everyone, and yet, paradoxically, a melancholy, a sadness, and a compassion because what matters most in life is never likely to happen". Clark's next work, In Search of Henry Lawson (1979), was a reworking of an essay which was originally written in 1964 as a chapter for Geoffrey Dutton's pioneering The Literature of Australia. It was worked up in some haste in response to the desire of the Macmillan publishing house for a new book with which they could cash in on Clark's popularity. Predictably, and with more than usual justification, Clark saw Lawson as another of his tragic heroes, and he wrote with a good deal of empathy of Lawson's losing battle with alcoholism: a fate Clark himself had narrowly avoided by giving up drink in the 1960s. But the book showed both its age and its haste of preparation, and was savaged by Colin Roderick, the leading authority on Lawson, as "a tangled thicket of factual errors, speculation and ideological interpretation".

By the time Volume V of the History, which covered the years between 1881 and 1915, appeared in 1981, Clark had increasingly withdrawn from political controversy. The retirement of Whitlam after his defeats at the 1975 and 1977 elections removed the main focus of Clark's political loyalty – he was not very impressed with Whitlam's pragmatic successor, Bill Hayden, and even less impressed with Hayden's chief rival, Bob Hawke, whom Clark had known since his student days at ANU and regarded as lacking in principle. In addition, Clark, although only in his mid 60s, was in poor health, already suffering from the heart problems that were to overshadow his final years. In any case, Clark made it clear in this volume that his enthusiasm for Whitlam had not changed his views of the Labor Party as a party: Labor's founding leaders, Chris Watson and Andrew Fisher, he wrote, were dull and unimaginative men, who wanted no more than that working men should have a modest share of the prosperity of bourgeois Australia. The real hero of Volume V was Alfred Deakin, leader of enlightened middle-class liberalism, and (like Clark) a product of Melbourne Grammar and Melbourne University.

In his last years, Clark responded to criticism about his treatment of the Aborigines with many lambasting him for his 1962 statement that "civilisation did not begin in Australia until the last quarter of the eighteenth century". In response, Clark stated that when he began the History, he was writing with a "British clock" in his mind, saying: "Now I want to go on to persuade Australians to build their own clock. That, I think, must start forty or fifty thousand years ago with the migration of the Aborigines to Australia...I told only a part of what is possibly the greatest human tragedy in the history of Australia-the confrontation between the white man and the Aborigine".

In 1983, Clark was hospitalised for the first time and underwent bypass surgery, and further surgery was needed in 1984. Always a pessimist, Clark became convinced that his time was running out, and from this point he lost interest in the outside world and its concerns and concentrated solely on finishing the History before his death. His work on Volume VI, to cover the years between the two world wars, led him to compare Hawke, who became Prime Minister in March 1983, with James Scullin, the hapless Labor Prime Minister of the Depression years who failed to take any radical steps and saw his government destroyed. Clark's health improved in 1985 and he was able to travel to China and to the Australian war cemeteries in France. A final burst of energy enabled him to finish Volume VI in 1986, although the story was taken only down to 1935, when both John Curtin and Robert Menzies emerged as national leaders, allowing Clark to draw a sharp contrast between these two, portraying Menzies as the representative of the old Anglo-Australian "grovellers" and Curtin as the leader of the new Australian nationalism. The book was launched in July 1987.

== Criticism of his work ==
By the 1970s, Clark, while still writing history which was conservative in a historiographical sense (that is, not based on any economic or class theory of history), had come to be seen as a "left-wing" historian, and eventually he accepted this label, despite his fundamental scepticism and pessimism. This meant that left-wing intellectuals and commentators generally praised his work, while right-wingers increasingly condemned it, in both cases often without much regard to the merit of the work.

Clark's purported defection to the left in the 1970s caused fury on the literary and intellectual right, particularly since he was accompanied by several other leading figures including Donald Horne and the novelist Patrick White, whose career has some parallels with Clark's. He was denounced in Quadrant and in the columns of the Murdoch press as the godfather of the "Black armband view of history". He was unfavourably compared with Geoffrey Blainey, Australia's leading "orthodox" historian (who coined the "black armband" phrase). Clark reacted to these attacks in typically contrary style by becoming more outspoken, thus provoking further attacks. These exchanges were made more bitter by the fact that most of the participants had been friends for many years.

The attacks on Clark were not entirely politically motivated. Clark's professional reputation as a historian declined during the later period of his life, and the final two volumes of the History were given scant attention by other serious historians, regardless of their political views. This was not because they were seen as too "left-wing," but because they were seen as verbose, repetitive and with few new insights to offer. Clark's publisher at MUP, Peter Ryan maintains that leading historians acknowledged to him in private that the later volumes of the History were inferior work, but would not say so publicly out of respect for Clark, or out of a reluctance to give ammunition to the political attacks on him. "By the time Volume V was published in 1981, this approached the proportions of a professional scandal. Quadrant, for example, asked five of Australia's leading historians to review it, and received five more of less identical replies: 'It's a terrible book, but you can't expect me to say that in print".

Clark's tendency to focus on individuals and their tragic flaws, while a serviceable approach when writing about the early days of colonial New South Wales, a small and isolated society dominated by such colourful characters as MacArthur and Wentworth, had much less validity when he was writing about the more complex Australia of the later 19th and 20th centuries. His lack of interest in economic and social history became less forgivable, particularly among the younger generation of historians, regardless of their politics. The Marxist Raewyn Connell wrote that Clark had no understanding of the historical process, assuming that things happened by chance or "by an odd irony". Bill Cope, writing in Labour History, the house-journal of left-wing historians, wrote that Clark had been "left behind, both by the new social movements of the postwar decades and the new histories which have transformed the way we see our past and ourselves". John Hirst, usually regarded as a moderately conservative historian, wrote: "In the end Clark became the sort of historian he had set out to supersede – a barracker for the 'progressive' side who accepted uncritically its view of the world".

== Posthumous reputation ==
By the time Clark died in May 1991, he had become something of a national institution, as much for his public persona as for his historical work. His goatee beard, his bush hat, his stout walking stick and his enigmatic public utterances had become widely known even among people who had never opened any of his books. It was this which inspired the 1988 project of turning the History into a musical, Manning Clark's History of Australia – The Musical, funded by the Australian Bicentenary and with a script by Don Watson, historian and later speechwriter to Labor Prime Minister Paul Keating. The show was a flop, but did not detract from Clark's public standing. The musical solidified Clark's reputation as a "shameless lover" of Australia as his stage version sang "For me Australia and no other/Mistress, harlot, goddess, mother/Whose first great native son I am". His last works were two volumes of autobiography, The Puzzles of Childhood (Viking 1989) and The Quest for Grace (Viking 1990). A third, unfinished volume, A Historian's Apprenticeship (Melbourne University Press 1992), was published after his death.

In September 1993, Quadrant published an article by Peter Ryan who had edited and published Volumes II to VI of Clark's History at Melbourne University Press. In this article he wrote that during this process "scholarly rigour and historical strictness were slowly seeping out of both man and History, and that a sententious showiness in both of them, as it grew, was making the whole undertaking unworthy of the imprint of a scholarly publishing house". Ryan's article was attacked by a range of critics, notably historians such as Russel Ward, Don Watson, Humphrey MacQueen, Stuart Macintyre and Paul Bourke, and the critic Robert Hughes. The polemic raged along left-right lines.

On 24 August 1996, the attack on Clark's reputation reached a new level with a front-page article by the Rupert Murdoch owned Herald Sun, alleging that Clark was a Soviet spy. It published excerpts of Clark's ASIO file and stated that he was friendly with two men who were later confirmed to be Soviet agents. It also claimed that he had been awarded the Order of Lenin for his services. The story was revisited in August 1999 with the allegation in Brisbane's Courier-Mail, that he had been a "Soviet agent of influence". In fact Clark, along with many others, had been given a mass-produced bronze medallion when he had visited Moscow in 1970, to speak at a conference organised to mark the centenary of Lenin's birth. An investigation by the Australian Press Council found the Order of Lenin allegations to be false. The Press Council ruling said: "The newspaper had too little evidence to assert that Prof Clark was awarded the Order of Lenin – rather there is much evidence to the contrary. That being so, the Press Council finds that the Courier-Mail was not justified in publishing its key assertion and the conclusions which so strongly flowed from it. The newspaper should have taken further steps to check the accuracy of its reports. While the Courier-Mail devoted much space to people challenging its assertions, the Press Council believes it should have retracted the allegations about which Prof Clark's supporters complained".

Further criticism of Clark's reliability arose in March 2007 with the discovery that Clark's account, given in his memoirs and elsewhere, of walking the streets of Bonn the day after Kristallnacht was untrue. By examining Clark's letters and diary, the writer Mark McKenna established that it was Clark's future wife Dymphna, and not Clark, who was present on that day, although Clark did arrive in Bonn a fortnight later. Brian Matthews notes, however, that when Clark was reunited with Dymphna "as his diary records, on 25 November 1938" evidence of Kristallnacht "was still shockingly visible, and it was explicit and confronting enough to scar his sensibilities and live in his memory...With his capacity for imaginative reconstruction and his acute sensitivity to emotional ambience and atmosphere, what he saw of its immediate aftermath was for him quite as shattering as the original event had been for Dymphna and others who had experienced it on the night of 10 November 1938".

== Honours ==
Clark was appointed a Companion of the Order of Australia (AC) in 1975. He was a Foundation Fellow of the Australian Academy of the Humanities (1969). He won the Fellowship of Australian Writers' (Victoria) Moomba History Book Award and the Henry Lawson Arts Award in 1969, the Australian Literature Society's gold medal in 1970, The Age Book Prize in 1974 and the New South Wales Premier's Literary Award in 1979. He was awarded honorary doctorates by the Universities of Melbourne, Newcastle and Sydney. In 1980 he was named Australian of the Year.

After Dymphna Clark's death in 2000, the Clark's home in Tasmania Circle, Forrest, designed by Robin Boyd, was turned into Manning Clark House, an educational centre devoted to Manning Clark's life and work. Manning Clark House "provides opportunities for the whole community to debate and discuss contemporary issues and ideas, through a program of conferences, seminars, forums, publishing, and arts and cultural events". In 1999 Manning Clark House inaugurated an annual Manning Clark Lecture, which is given each year by a distinguished Australian.

As well as McKenna's book, Brian Matthews published "Manning Clark: A Life" in 2008. In the interim two less ambitious books have appeared: Stephen Holt's study A Short History of Manning Clark and Carl Bridge's collection of essays, Manning Clark: His Place in History. Manning Clark House is also planning to publish an edition of Clark's letters.

The Manning Clark Centre, a former lecture theatre complex at the Australian National University, was named in his honour. In the south of Canberra, Manning Clark House was built in his legacy in 1984 and served as the ACT Department of Education headquarters. The building is now occupied by the Department of Human Services.

During 1988, the bicentennial year of European occupation, a stage musical 'Manning Clark's History of Australia; the Musical', performed for several weeks in Melbourne. Based mainly on Volume 1, it failed to fill houses and ran only seven weeks. The poster featured Clark, holding a set of his History, in a chorus line of significant Australian characters, flanked by Ned Kelly and Nellie Melba.

He is the grandfather of Australian historian and historiographer Anna Clark (Australian historian).

== Select bibliography ==
=== Books ===
- Clark, C. M. H.; Pryor, L. J. (1950). Select documents in Australian history 1788-1850. Sydney: Angus & Robertson. ISBN 0207941432.
- Clark, C. M. H. (1962). A History of Australia. Vol. I. From the Earliest Time to the Age of Macquarie. Carlton: Melbourne University Press. ISBN 0522841651.
- Clark, C. M. H.; Shaw, A. G. L., eds. (1967). Australian dictionary of biography : volume 2 : 1788-1850, I-Z. Melbourne: Melbourne University Press.
- Clark, C. M. H. (1968). A History of Australia. Vol. II. New South Wales and Van Diemen's Land. 1822-1838. Carlton: Melbourne University Press. ISBN 0522838219.
- Clark, C. M. H. (1973). A History of Australia. Vol. III. The Beginning of an Australian Civilization. 1824-1851. Carlton: Melbourne University Press. ISBN 052284054X.
- Clark, C. M. H. (1978). A History of Australia. Vol. IV. The Earth Abideth for Ever. 1851-1888. Carlton: Melbourne University Press. ISBN 0522841449.
- Clark, C. M. H. (1981). A History of Australia. Vol. V. The People Make Laws. 1888-1915. Carlton: Melbourne University Press. ISBN 0522842232.
- Clark, C. M. H. (1987). A History of Australia. Vol. VI. 'The Old Dead Tree and the Young Tree Green'. 1916-1935 with an epilogue. Carlton: Melbourne University Press. ISBN 0522843522.
- Clark, Manning; Hooper, Meredith; Ferrier, Susanne (illustrator) (1988). The Ashton Scholastic History of Australia. Sydney: Ashton Scholastic. ISBN 086896686X.

=== Articles ===
- Clark, C. M. H. (1962) "Faith," in Australian Civilization: A Symposium, edited by Peter Coleman. Melbourne: F. W. Cheshire.

== Bibliography ==
- Clark, C. M. H. (1992). A historian's apprenticeship. Carlton, Vic.: Melbourne University Press. ISBN 0-522-84510-X. OCLC 27101888.
- Holt, Stephen (1982). Manning Clark and Australian history, 1915-1963. St Lucia, Queensland, Australia: University of Queensland Press. ISBN 0-7022-1590-2. OCLC 7574503.
- Michael Cathcart (1993) Manning Clark's History of Australia an abridgement, Melbourne University Press, Carlton (Vic)
- Holt, Stephen (1999). A short history of Manning Clark. St Leonards, N.S.W.: Allen & Unwin. ISBN 1-86508-059-4. OCLC 43900884.
- Hughes-Warrington, Marnie (2000). Fifty key thinkers on history. London: Routledge. ISBN 0-415-16981-X. OCLC 44015805.
- Brian Matthews (2008), Manning Clark. A life, Allen & Unwin Crows Nest Sydney (NSW)
- Mark McKenna (2011), An Eye for Eternity: The Life of Manning Clark, Miegunyah Press, Carlton (Vic)
