= Evgeny Dobrenko =

Russian historian

Evgeny Dobrenko (born 4 April 1962) is a Ukrainian-American historian. Born in Odessa, he moved to Moscow and worked at Moscow State University and the Russian State University for the Humanities. He emigrated to the US and worked at Duke University, Stanford University, UC Irvine, Amherst College and NYU. He then moved to the UK, and worked at the University of Nottingham and the University of Sheffield. He is now professor of Russian studies at the Ca' Foscari University of Venice.

His lifelong area of academic interest has been Stalinist culture. He was awarded the Efim Etkind Prize for the best book about Russian Culture in 2012 and the AATSEEL Award for Outstanding Contributions to Scholarship in 2019. His book Late Stalinism was nominated for the Pushkin House Book Prize.

== Works ==
- State Laughter: Stalinism, Populism, and Origins of Soviet Culture
- Late Stalinism: The Aesthetics of Politics
- "It's Just Letters on Paper…" Vladimir Sorokin: After Literature
- Socialist Realism in Central and Eastern European Literatures under Stalin: Institutions, Dynamics, Discourses
- Russian literature since 1991
- A History of Russian Literary Theory and Criticism: The Soviet Age and Beyond
- The Cambridge Companion to Twentieth-Century Russian Literature
- Noncanonical Classic: Dmitry Aleksandrovich Prigov
- Petrified Utopia: Happiness Soviet Style
- Stalinist Cinema and the Production of History: Museum of the Revolution
- Political Economy of Socialist Realism
- Soviet Culture and Power A History in Documents, 1917–1953
- Aesthetics of Alienation: Reassessment of Early Soviet Cultural Theories
- Russian Literary Criticism: 1917–1932
- The Landscape of Stalinism: The Art and Ideology of Soviet Space
- Soviet Riches: Essays on Culture, Literature and Film
- The Making of the State Writer: Social and Aesthetic Origins of Soviet Literary Culture
- Socialist Realist Canon
- Endquote: Sots-Art Literature and Soviet Grand Style
- The Making of the State Reader: Social and Aesthetic Contexts of the Reception of Soviet Literature
- Socialist Realism without Shores
- Metaphor of Power: Literature of the Stalin Era in Historical Context
- Isaac Babel's Red Cavalry
- Ridding Ourselves of Mirages. Socialist Realism Today
