= Mateship =

Australian concept of solidarity and fraternity

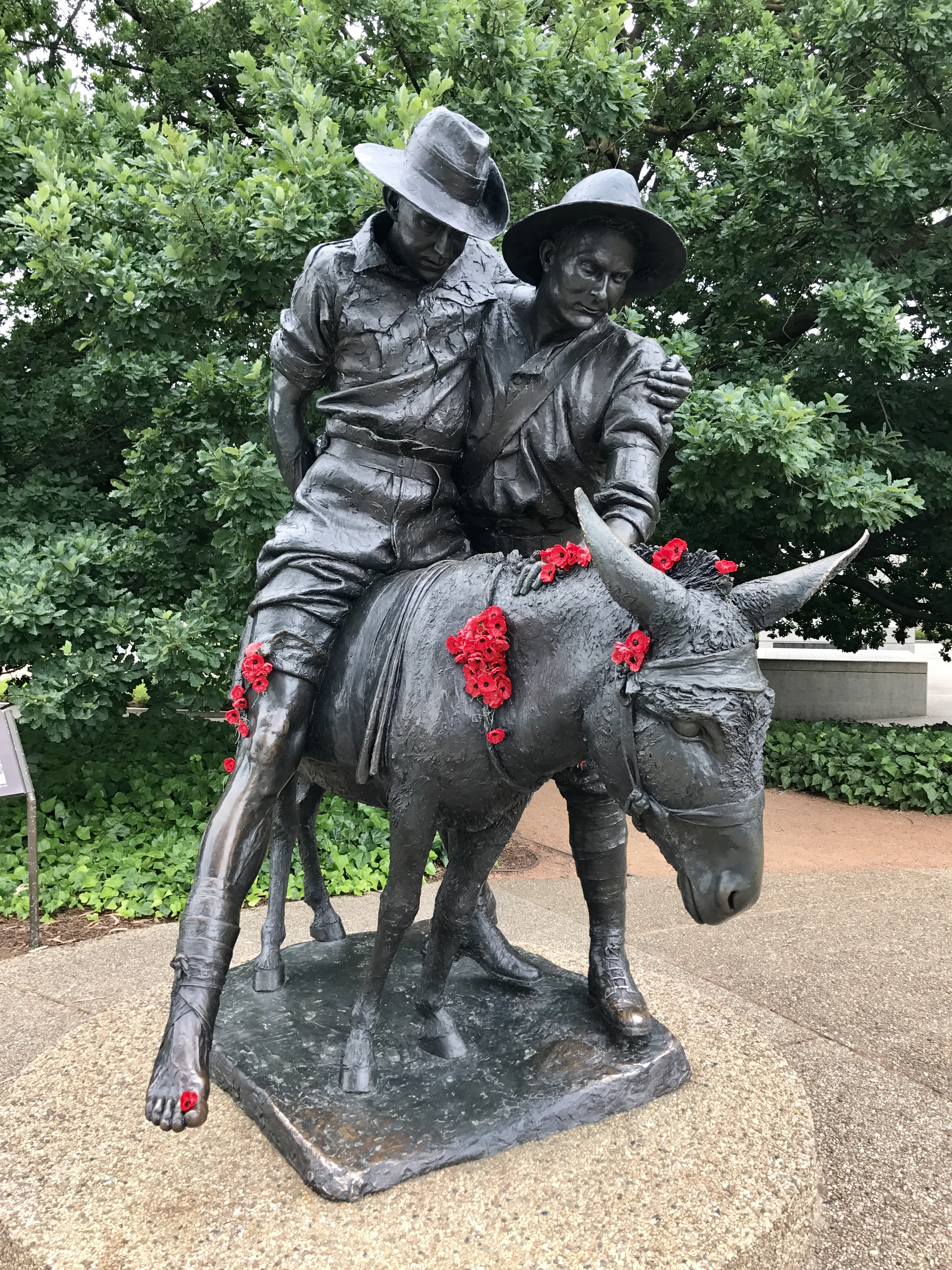
Simpson and his donkey exemplify the spirit of mateship.

Mateship is an Australian cultural idiom that embodies equality, loyalty and friendship. Russel Ward, in The Australian Legend (1958), once saw the concept as central to the Australian people. Mateship derives from mate, meaning friend, commonly used in Australia as an amicable form of address, and ship, referring to the vessel that transported many early convicts and settlers to Australia who subsequently gave voice and expression to this uniquely Australian value.

== Historical origins ==
Most simply, the term mateship describes "feelings of solidarity and fraternity that Australians, usually men, are typically alleged to exhibit."

The historical origins of the term are explained in Nick Dyrenfurth's Mateship: a very Australian history (2015). He cites the work of historian Russell Ward, who argued that "a convict-derived ethos of matey anti-authoritarianism embedded itself in the Australian psyche from the beginning." The original obligations of mateship could be compared to 'codes amongst thieves.' It likely emerged out of a shared fear of authority. Men who betrayed their companions, or accepted authority over them, would be called 'dogs' for their betrayal.

According to Dyrenfurth, "Much of the rest of the world thinks of this practice as friendship, pure and simple. Yet in Australia, mateship evokes more than mere friendship.... Most Australian citizens ... associate mateship with wartime service - in particular, the Anzac tradition forged on the shores of faraway Gallipoli during April 1915."

== Military context ==
Mateship is regarded as an Australian military virtue. For instance, the Australian Army Recruit Training Centre lists the "soldierly qualities" it seeks to instill as including "a will to win, dedication to duty, honour, compassion and honesty, mateship and teamwork, loyalty, and physical and moral courage."

The word mate bloomed during World War I, when many trenches were being built because of the machine gun. Many trenches were built which often stretched miles across war grounds. The words “diggers” and “mate” gained the same meaning and became interchangeable.

== Australian Constitutional preamble ==
During the 1999 Australian constitutional referendum there was some consideration regarding the inclusion of the term "mateship" in the preamble of the Australian constitution. This proposed change was drafted by the Australian poet Les Murray, in consultation with the Prime Minister of the time, John Howard:

Australians are free to be proud of their country and heritage, free to realise themselves as individuals, and free to pursue their hopes and ideals. We value excellence as well as fairness, independence as dearly as mateship.

Murray was not supportive of the inclusion of "mateship" in the preamble, stating that it was "blokeish" and "not a real word", but the Prime Minister insisted it be included as the term, he said, had "a hallowed place in the Australian lexicon". Howard reluctantly dropped the term from the preamble, after the Australian Democrats refused to allow it to be passed by the Senate where they held the balance of power. If the proposed constitutional amendment had been adopted, it would have made Australia the first country in the world to constitutionally enshrine the concept of mateship. The BBC referred to the proposal as a "declaration of mateship" (a play on the American Declaration of Independence).

Since the referendum the Australian government has introduced the concept of mateship as a possible part of an Australian citizenship test, although it was unclear how endorsement of the values of mateship would be tested.

The concept of mateship was also formed by the significant disparity between the male and female population, resulting in an acute shortage of marriageable women in colonial Australia. This situation was reversed after the First World War death of young males to the extent that there were more women than eligible males.

== More than friendship ==
Mateship is a concept that can be traced back to early colonial times. The harsh environment in which convicts and new settlers found themselves meant that men and women closely relied on each other for all sorts of help. In Australia, a 'mate' is more than just a friend and is a term that implies a sense of shared experience, mutual respect and unconditional assistance.

The term includes use in ways other than friendship like getting someone's attention, replacing a name, questioning a statement, letting one know to calm down and referring to someone in a rash or harsh way. The use of such in a harsh or negative way can be traced back to the word "bastard". Around the 16th century, the word "mate" adopted a similar meaning. Only within the last two centuries, has the term connected itself with a meaning of friendship.

After the Beaconsfield mine disaster, the miners involved presented the federal government with a "declaration of mateship and thanks".

== Common use ==
According to the Lingo Dictionary of Favourite Australian Words and Phrases Australians use the salutation 'old mate' to "greet someone whose name they can't remember."

== See also ==
- Culture of Australia
- ANZAC spirit
