= Matei Calinescu Prize =

Scholarly award in literature and language

The Matei Calinescu Prize is a triennial prize given to an academic by the Modern Language Association.

== Description ==
The prize is awarded for a distinguished work of scholarship in twentieth- or twenty-first-century literature and thought. The prize is usually given to a first or second work published by an entrant. The prize has been established in honor of Matei Calinescu, a Romanian poet and scholar who taught at Indiana University, Bloomington.

== Notable winners ==
Past winners of the prize include:

2014–15

Paul K. Saint-Amour, University of Pennsylvania, for Tense Future: Modernism, Total War, Encyclopedic Form (Oxford Univ. Press, 2015)

Honorable mention: Rebecca L. Walkowitz, Rutgers University, New Brunswick, for Born Translated: The Contemporary Novel in an Age of World Literature (Columbia Univ. Press, 2015)
