= Dymphna Clark =

Australian language scholar (1916–2000)

- Born: Hilma Dymphna Lodewyckx; 18 December 1916; Melbourne, Victoria, Australia
- Died: 12 May 2000 (aged 83); Australia
- Occupations: Linguist, historian
- Spouse: Manning Clark
- Children: Andrew, Axel, Benedict, Katerina, Rowland, Sebastian
- Website: www.womenaustralia.info

Hilma Dymphna Clark (née Lodewyckx; 18 December 1916 – 12 May 2000) was an Australian linguist and educator. She was married to the historian Manning Clark.

== Biography ==
Born in Melbourne of Swedish and Flemish ancestry, Clark was educated at Mont Albert Central School and the Presbyterian Ladies' College in East Melbourne. Her father was Augustin Lodewyckx, the Associate Professor of Germanic languages at Melbourne University, and her mother – Anna Sophia (née Hansen) – also taught Swedish at Melbourne University.

Clark finished Presbyterian Ladies' College early (aged 15) and spent time at school in Munich, with her mother, in 1933. Returning to Melbourne, she studied languages to honours level at Melbourne University, where she met Manning Clark. In 1938, she travelled to Bonn on a scholarship to undertake doctoral studies in German literature.

She was there when Kristallnacht occurred, and left soon after with the increasing threat of war. She met with Clark in Oxford and they married there on 31 January 1939. They had six children together. She taught at Blundell's School in Devon in the first year of her marriage and they returned to Australia in 1940. Clark became a distinguished linguist and translator, fluent in eight languages and able to speak another four. She lectured in German at the Australian National University in Canberra. Her translations included the botanist Charles von Hugel's New Holland Journals and, with Peter Sack, the German reports of the Governor of German New Guinea from 1886 to 1914. She also worked on her husband's projects, undertaking editing and research.

She established Manning Clark House as a living museum (Dympha and Manning's own house from 1953), and was heavily involved in the Aboriginal Treaty Committee (1979–1983); it was she who drafted the Council's preamble for review by Parliament.

Since 2002, the Dymphna Clark Memorial Lecture has been given in her honour.
