= Gunnie =

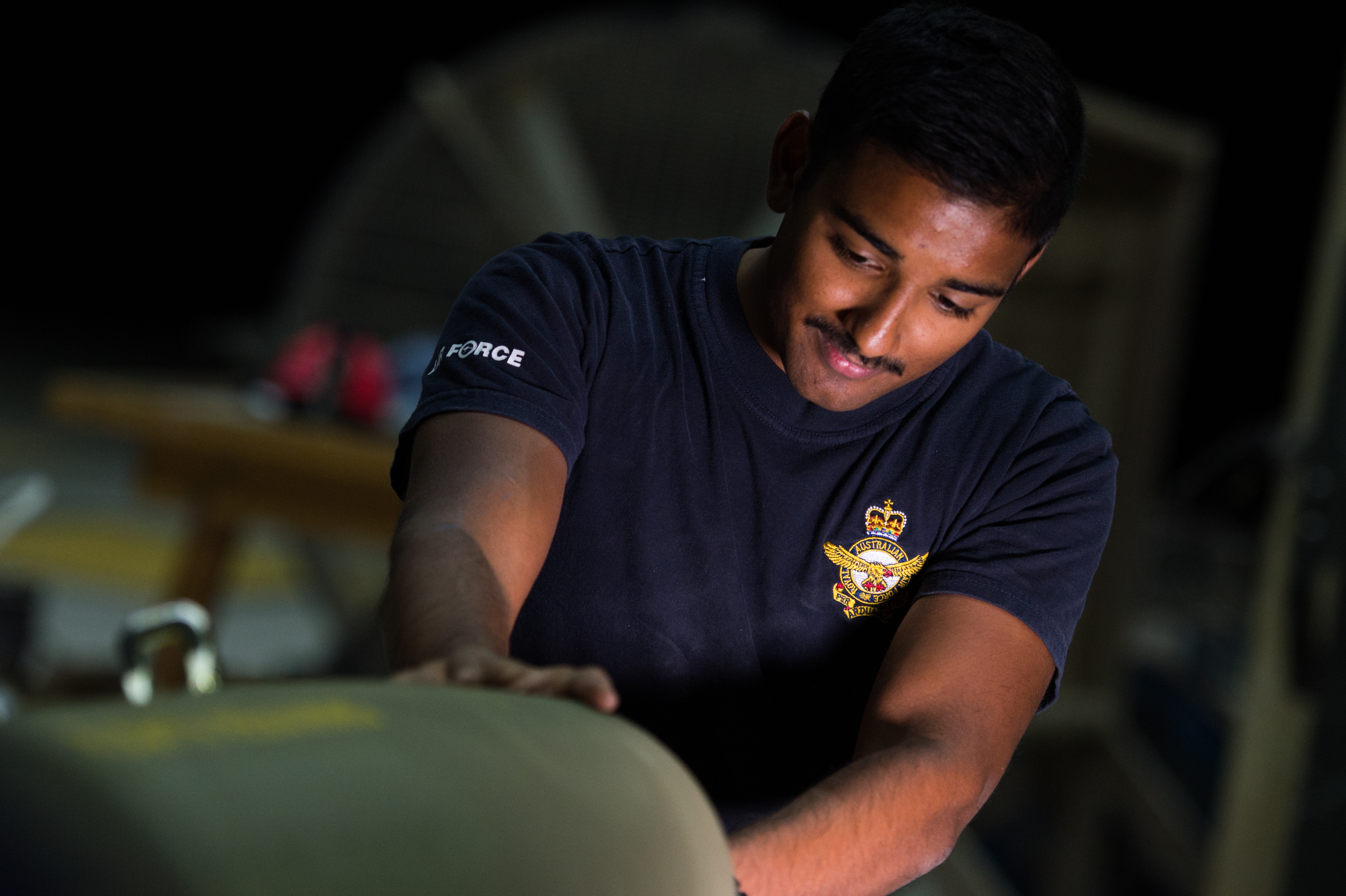
A RAAF armament technician constructing a Joint Direct Attack Munition in 2017

Gunnie is a term used in the Royal Australian Air Force (RAAF) and Royal New Zealand Air Force (RNZAF) when referring to an armourer or aircraft technician who loads or maintains aircraft ordnance, weapons, ejection seats, or any other device that contains explosive material. A second major function of their speciality is Explosive Ordnance Demolition (EOD) – the safe removal of unexploded bombs (UXB's) and the disposal/recovery of Improvised Explosive Devices (IED's). Armourers are also responsible for the maintenance of all small arms used by the RAAF and generally run the maintenance workshops in all RAAF base armouries.

Alternative names include "Gun Plumber" and "Cracker Stacker"

Distinctly independent of the other aircraft trades, their motto has been "Without armament there is no need for an airforce" since Lord Trenchard uttered the words prior to World War I, although armourers didn't actually exist then.

In the early nineties the armament mustering (along with other RAAF aircraft technical trades) was disbanded and all were rolled into two musterings: Avionics and Aircraft. Engine fitters and Airframe fitters became Aircraft Technicians while Instrument Fitters, Electrical Fitters and Radio Technicians became Avionics Technicians. The only mustering which could not fit neatly into either (due to the multi disciplinary nature of their work) the gunnies were given the choice of going to either mustering. Of the 400 or so in the whole of the RAAF only a handful elected to become Aircraft Technicians. The bulk of them were rolled into the Avionics Technician category. This was, at the time, considered a controversial decision given the highly specialised skills required to be an armourer.

In the late 2000s the RAAF re-established the Armament mustering with the first class graduating from the RAAF College, School of Technical Training RAAF Base Wagga in 2008/09.
