= Manning Clark House =

Building in Canberra, Australia

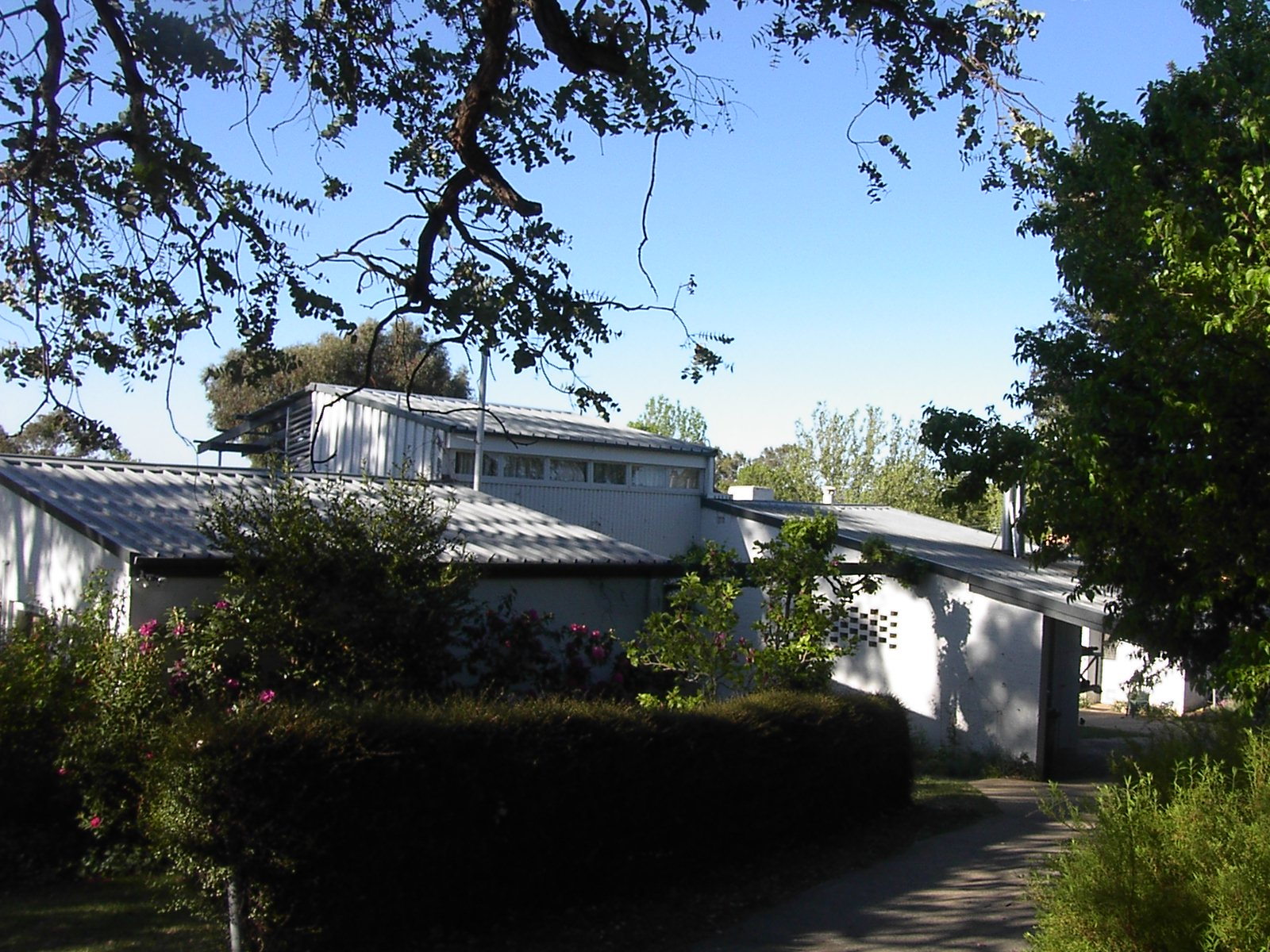
- Manning and Dymphna Clark's home in Forrest, where they lived from 1955 until Manning's death in 1991 and Dymphna's in 2000.
- Interactive map of the Manning Clark House area
- Alternative names: Manning Clark home

General information
- Status: Completed
- Architectural style: International Modern Movement
- Location: 11 Tasmania Circle, Forrest, Australian Capital Territory, Australia
- Completed: 1952
- Client: Manning and Dymphna Clark

Design and construction
- Architect: Robin Boyd

Website
- manningclark.org.au

The Manning Clark House, designed by Australian architect, Robin Boyd in 1952, is a house located at 11 Tasmania Circle, Forrest, a suburb of Canberra in the Australian Capital Territory. The house was built for Professor Manning Clark (1915 – 1991), described as "Australia's most famous historian", and his wife, Dymphna Clark, (1916 – 2000), a linguist and educator.

The house is now home to Manning Clark House Inc. (MCH), a community based institution that nurtures creative practice and research in Australian history, human rights, literature, music, visual art, and indigenous culture, as well as discussion and debate on issues of public importance and all areas of scholarly interest. The organisation supports the intellectual and creative community through a network of scholars and community garden. The program includes public lectures, open forums, seminars, conferences, art exhibitions, poetry readings, concerts, book launches, human rights education, and social gatherings in the former home of Manning and Dymphna Clark.

Following the 2000 death of Dymphna Clark, the house was transferred to community use.

A full calendar of events is available on the website.

== Heritage significance ==
The Manning Clark House was entered into onto the Australian Capital Territory Heritage Register on 27 September 1996 in recognition of the architect and link to Professor Manning Clark. The Australian Capital Territory chapter of the Australian Institute of Architects also recognises it as a notable building within the Territory noting the design was specific for Professor Manning Clark's requirements for isolated study.

== See also ==
- Australian residential architectural styles
