= Stefan Berger (historian) =

German historian

- Born: 1964 (age 61–62); Langenfeld, North Rhine-Westphalia, West Germany
- Occupation: Historian
- Organizations: IG BCE; UCU
- Known for: Modern and contemporary European history, especially of Germany and Britain, nationalism and national identity studies, history of historiography and historical theory, labour history and industrial heritage
- Political party: SPD
- Other political affiliations: Labour Party
- Board member of: DGB's 'Memory Cultures of Social Democracy' commission (2018-2021)

Academic background
- Education: University of Oxford
- Thesis: The Labour Party and the SPD. A Comparison of their Structure and Development and a Discussion of the Relations Between the Two Movements, 1900–1933 (1990)

Academic work
- Discipline: History
- Sub-discipline: Social history
- Website: Stefan Berger publications on Academia.edu

Stefan Berger (born 1964) is the Director of the Institute for Social Movements, Ruhr University Bochum, Germany, and Chairman of the committee of the Library of the Ruhr Foundation. He is Professor of Social History at the Ruhr University. He specializes in nationalism and national identity studies, historiography and historical theory, comparative labour studies, and the history of industrial heritage. Berger is the editor-in-chief of Moving the Social journal.

== Biography ==
Berger was born in the Rhineland town of Langenfeld in 1964. From 1985 to 1987, he attended the University of Cologne, where he studied history, political science and German literature. In 1990, he graduated with a PhD from the University of Oxford, with a thesis on The Labour Party and the SPD. A Comparison of their Structure and Development and a Discussion of the Relations Between the Two Movements, 1900–1933. He was a lecturer in Modern European History at the University of Plymouth in 1990/91, and from 1991 to 2000 he lectured in the same field at the School of European Studies, University of Wales, Cardiff. Until 2011, he was Professor of Modern German and Comparative European History at the University of Manchester, UK.

A significant part of Berger's research and works is on the nationalization of history. Berger was instrumental in the programme 'Representations of the Past: The Writing of National Histories in Nineteenth and Twentieth Century Europe (NHIST)' that the European Science Foundation organized between 2003 and 2008.

Whilst working in the UK Berger was a member of the Labour Party and the University and College Union. Upon his return to Germany, he joined the Social Democratic Party of Germany and became a member of the IG Bergbau, Chemie, Energie trade union.

== Selected works ==
- 1994: Berger, Stefan (15 December 1994). The British Labour Party and the German Social Democrats, 1900–1931. Oxford University Press. doi:10.1093/acprof:oso/9780198205005.001.0001. ISBN 978-0-19-820500-5.
- 1997: The Search for Normality: National Identity and Historical Consciousness in Germany since 1800, Berghahn Books, 1997, ISBN 1-57181-620-8
- 1999: Smith, Angel; Berger, Stefan (1999). Nationalism, labour and ethnicity, 1870-1939. Manchester: Manchester University Press. ISBN 0-7190-5052-9. OCLC 41469163.
- 2004: Berger, Stefan (2004). Germany. London: Arnold. ISBN 0-340-70585-X. OCLC 55947656.
- 2005: Berger, Stefan (2005). "A Return to the National Paradigm? National History Writing in Germany, Italy, France, and Britain from 1945 to the Present". The Journal of Modern History. 77 (3). University of Chicago Press: 629–678. doi:10.1086/497719. ISSN 0022-2801.
- 2007: Berger, Stefan (2007). Writing the nation : a global perspective. Basingstoke: Palgrave Macmillan. ISBN 978-0-230-00802-1. OCLC 85689589.
- Berger, Stefan; Lorenz, Chris; European Science Foundation (2008). The contested nation : ethnicity, class, religion and gender in national histories. Basingstoke [England]: Palgrave Macmillan. ISBN 978-0-230-50006-8. OCLC 221962074.
- 2008: Berger, Stefan; Eriksonas, Linas; Mycock, Andrew (2008). Narrating the nation : representations in history, media and the arts. New York. ISBN 978-1-84545-865-2. OCLC 647933218.
- 2010: Berger, Stefan; Lorenz, Chris (2010). Nationalizing the past : historians as nation builders in modern Europe. Basingstoke, Hampshire: Palgrave Macmillan. ISBN 978-0-230-29250-5. OCLC 696313992.
- 2010: Berger, Stefan; Laporte, Norman (2010). Friendly enemies : Britain and the GDR, 1949/1990. New York: Berghahn Books. ISBN 978-1-84545-697-9. OCLC 727775780.
