= Tommy Atkins =

Nickname for a British soldier

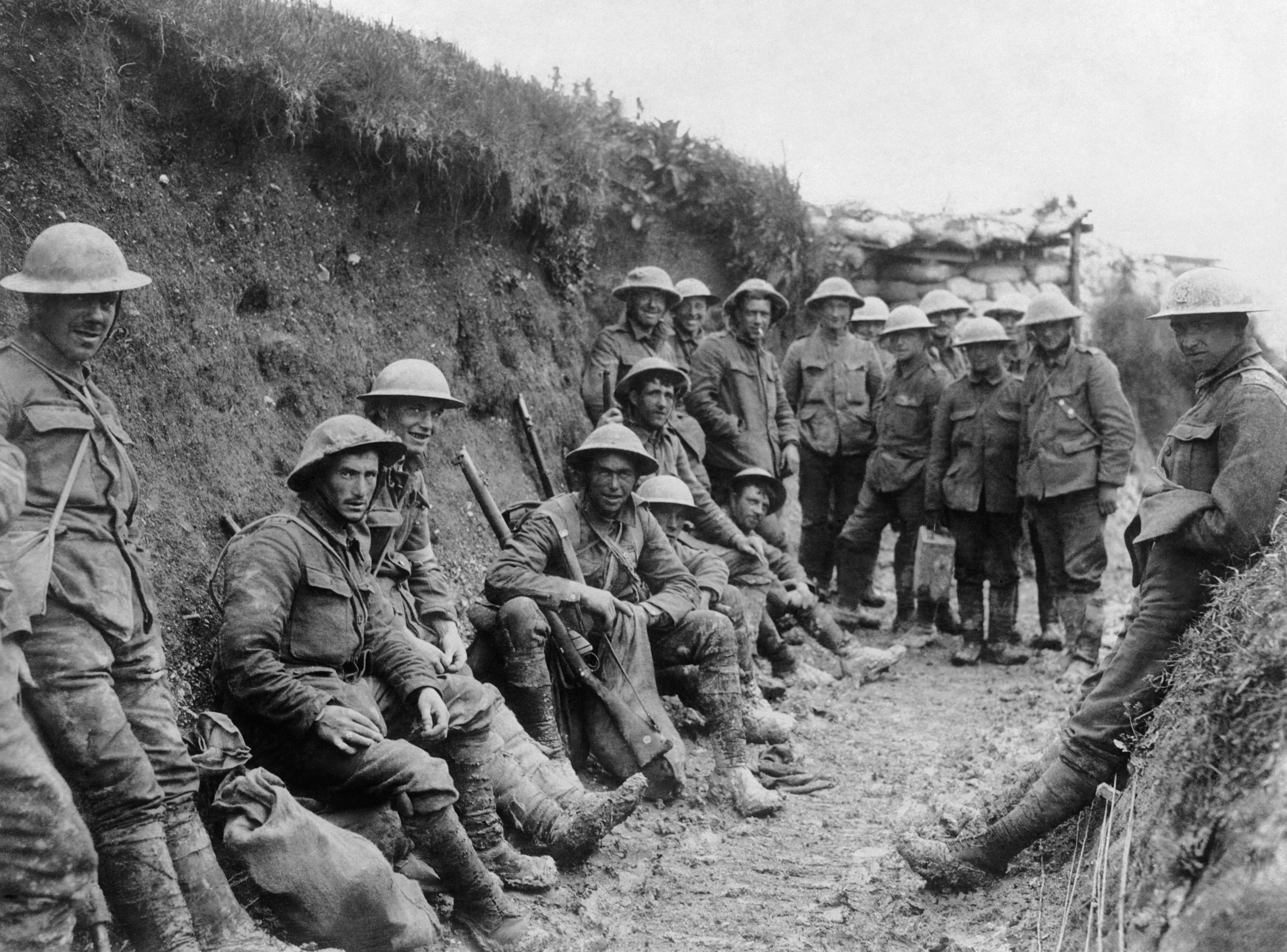
"Tommies" from the Royal Irish Rifles in the Battle of the Somme's trenches during the First World War

Tommy Atkins (often just Tommy) is slang for a common soldier in the British Army. It was well established during the nineteenth century, but is particularly associated with the First World War. It can be used as a term of reference, or as a form of address. German soldiers would allegedly call out to "Tommy" across no man's land if they wished to speak to a British soldier. French and Commonwealth troops would also call British soldiers "Tommies". In more recent times, the term "Tommy Atkins" has been used less frequently, although the name "Tom" is occasionally still heard; private soldiers in the British Army's Parachute Regiment are still referred to as "Toms".

== Etymology ==
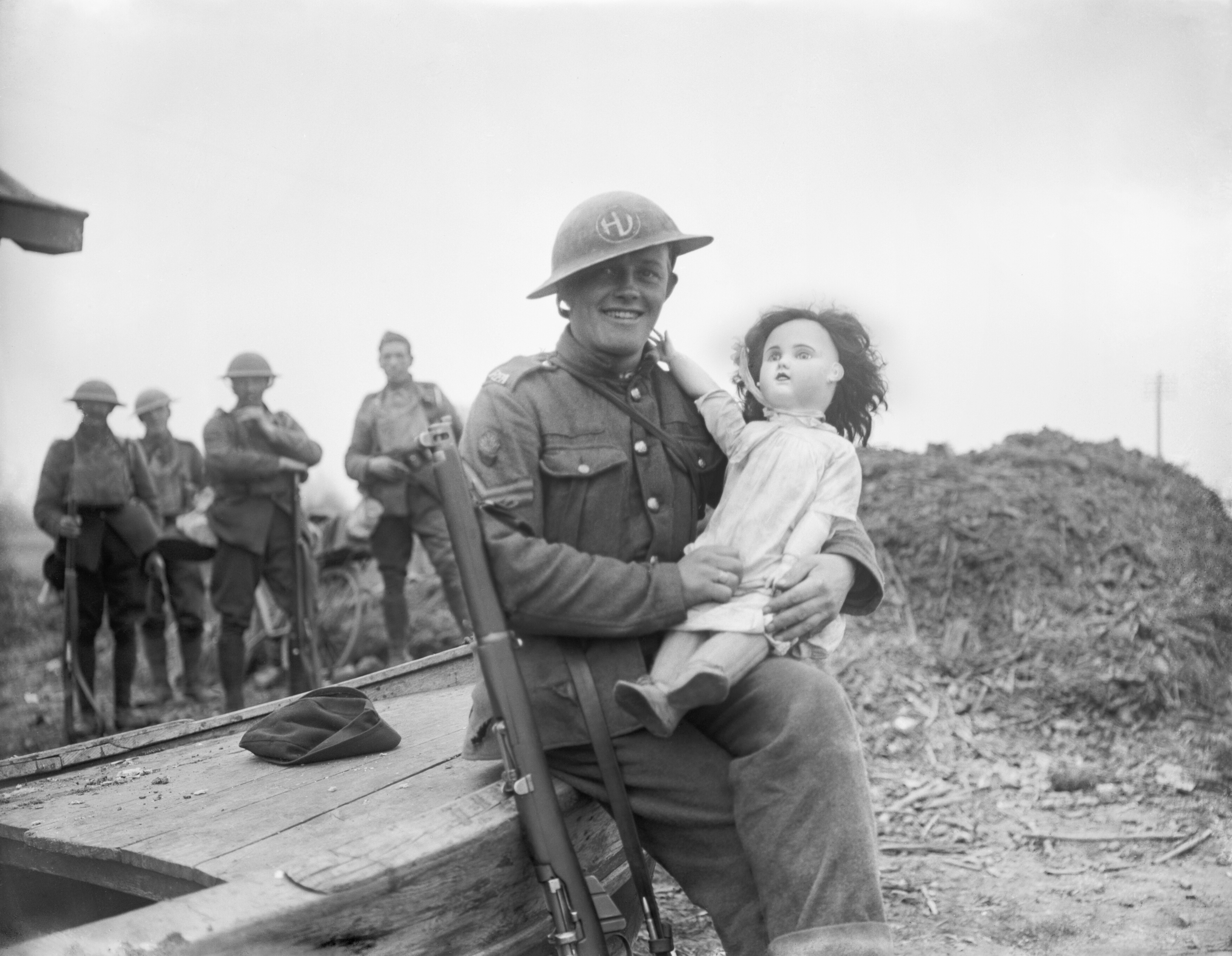
A publicity photograph of "Tommy Atkins", a soldier of the 51st (Highland) Division, seated with a large doll in his arms, taken during the German offensive in Lys, 13 April 1918

Tommy Atkins or Thomas Atkins has been used as a generic name for a common British soldier for many years. The origin of the term is a subject of debate, but it is known to have been used as early as 1743. A letter sent from Jamaica about a mutiny amongst the troops says "except for those from N. America ye Marines and Tommy Atkins behaved splendidly".

A common belief is that the name was chosen by Lieutenant-colonel Arthur Wellesley, having been inspired by the bravery of a soldier at the Battle of Boxtel, which was fought on 14–15 September 1794 during the Flanders campaign. Following a fierce encounter Wellesley, commanding the 33rd Regiment of Foot, purportedly spotted the best soldier in the regiment, Private Thomas Atkins, terribly wounded. Atkins said, "It's all right, sir. It's all in a day's work", and died shortly after. According to the Imperial War Museum, this theory has Wellesley choosing the name in 1843.

According to J. H. Leslie, writing in Notes and Queries in 1912, "Tommy Atkins" was chosen as a generic name by the War Office in 1815, in every sample infantry form in the Soldiers Account Book, signing with a mark. The Cavalry form had Trumpeter William Jones and Sergeant John Thomas, though they did not use a mark. Leslie observes the same name in the 1837 King's Regulations, pages 204 and 210, and later editions. Leslie comments that this disproves the anecdote about the Duke of Wellington selecting the name in 1843.

Richard Holmes, in the prologue to his 2005 book, Tommy, states that:

Atkins became a sergeant in the 1837 version, and was now able to sign his name rather than merely make his mark.

The Oxford English Dictionary states its origin as "arising out of the casual use of this name in the specimen forms given in the official regulations from 1815 onward"; the citation references Collection of Orders, Regulations, etc., pp. 75–87, published by the War Office, 31 August 1815. The name is used for an exemplary cavalry and infantry soldier; other names used included William Jones and John Thomas. Thomas Atkins continued to be used in the Soldier's Account Book until the early 20th century.

A further suggestion was given in 1900 by an army chaplain named Reverend E. J. Hardy. He wrote of an incident during the Sepoy Rebellion in 1857. When most of the Europeans in Lucknow were fleeing to the British Residency for protection, a private of the 32nd Regiment of Foot remained on duty at an outpost. Despite the pleas of his comrades, he insisted that he must remain at his post. He was killed at his post, and the Reverend Hardy wrote that "His name happened to be Tommy Atkins and so, throughout the Mutiny Campaign, when a daring deed was done, the doer was said to be 'a regular Tommy Atkins'".

== Popular references ==
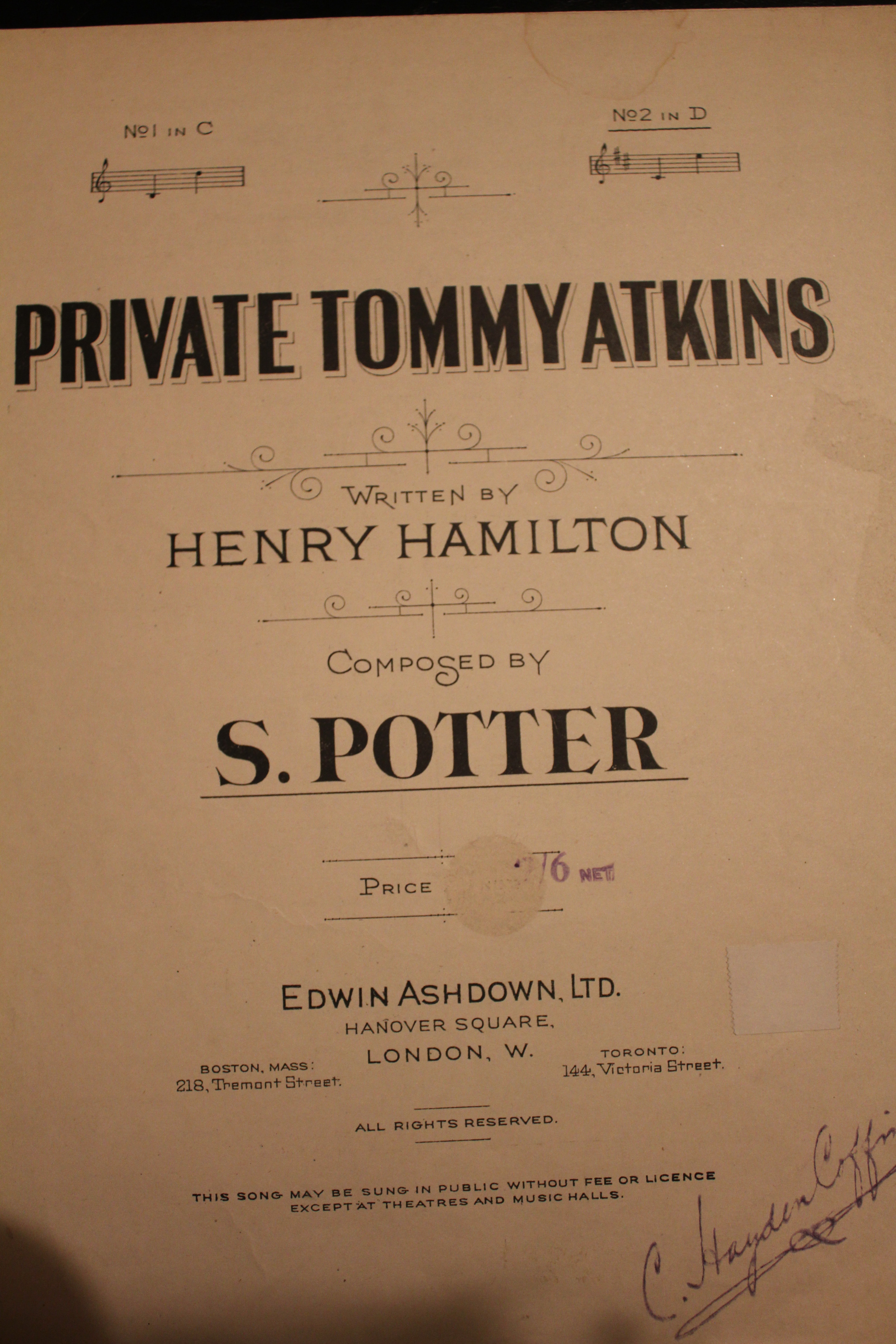
Front cover of sheet music, pub 1893, for song "Private Tommy Atkins" composed by Samuel Potter (1851–1934) and Henry Hamilton (c. 1854 – 1918). Signed by baritone C. Hayden Coffin.

Rudyard Kipling published the poem "Tommy" (part of the Barrack-Room Ballads, which were dedicated "To T.A.") in 1892. In reply, William McGonagall wrote "Lines in Praise of Tommy Atkins" in 1898, which was an attack on what McGonagall saw as the disparaging portrayal of Tommy in Kipling's poem.

In 1893, for the musical play A Gaiety Girl, Henry Hamilton (lyrics) and Samuel Potter (music) wrote the song Private Tommy Atkins for the baritone C. Hayden Coffin. It was immediately published by Willcocks & Co. Ltd. in London and published by T. B. Harms & Co. in New York the next year. The song was also reintroduced into later performances of San Toy for Hayden Coffin. He recalled singing it on Ladysmith Night (1 March 1900) where "the audience were roused to such a pitch of enthusiasm, that they rose to their feet, and commenced to shower money on to the stage".

In the children's fantasy novel The Indian in the Cupboard (1980) by Lynne Reid Banks, toy soldiers representing various historical wars are brought to life by magic. One is a World War I medic who says his name is Tommy Atkins. Steve Coogan plays this character in the 1995 film adaptation. "Tommy cooker" was a nickname for a British soldier's portable stove.

Some copies of the war-themed Commodore 64 game Who Dares Wins II credit programmer Steve Evans as "Tommy Atkins".

== See also ==
- Alternative names for the British
- Brodie helmet
- Digger, Doughboy and Poilu for the Allied counterparts
- G.I.
- HMS Birkenhead (1845)
- Jack Tar
- Jerry (WWII)
- Joe Bloggs
- Kraut
- Limey
- Squaddie
- Mehmetçik and Johnny Turk
