= Mehmetçik =

Term for soldiers of the Ottoman and Turkish Armies

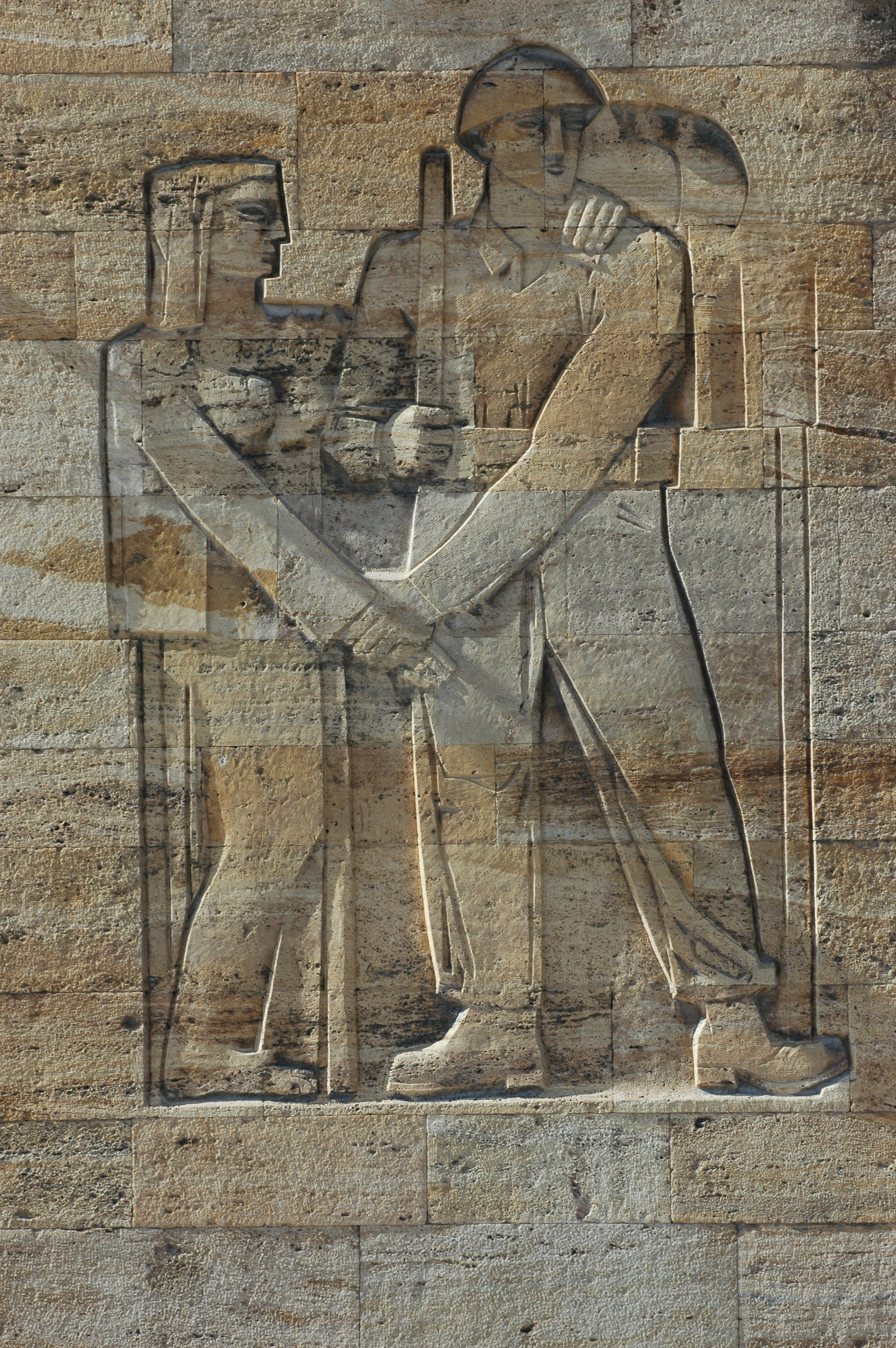
Relief of a Mehmetçik and his mother at the Anıtkabir (tomb of Atatürk).

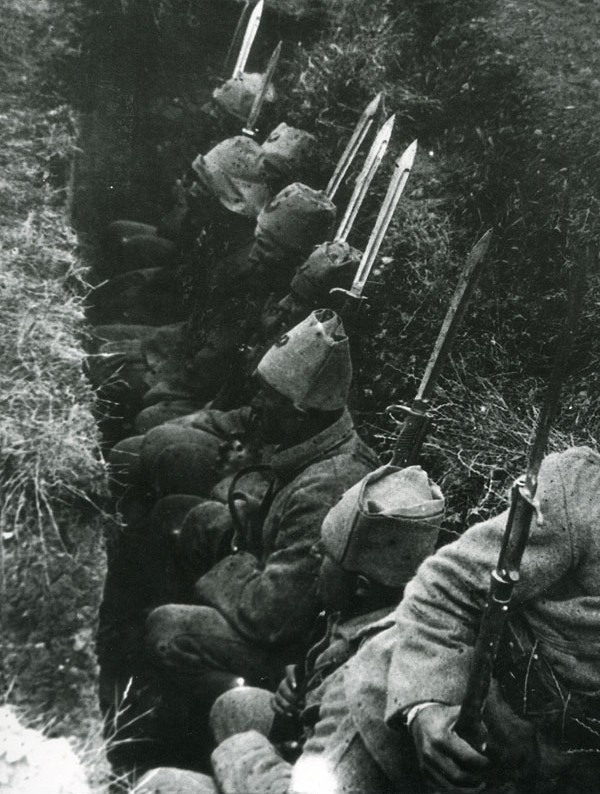
Mehmetçiks during the Turkish War of Independence in the trenches, with bayonets fixed on their rifles

Mehmetçik (Ottoman Turkish: محمدجك, pronounced [mɛhmɛt'd͡ʒɪk]; lit. 'little Mehmet') is a term generally used to affectionately refer to soldiers of the Turkish Army. It is similar to the colloquialisms Tommy Atkins, Doughboy, and Digger used for soldiers of the British, U.S., and Australian armies.

It is believed that the term is based on Ottoman Army Sergeant Bigalı Mehmet Çavuş (1878–1964), who fought during the Gallipoli Campaign of World War I.

== See also ==
- Respect to Mehmetçik Monument
- Poilu
- Johnny Turk
