= Gallipoli Star =

Military medal issued by the Ottoman empire

Gallipoli Star Harp Madalyası
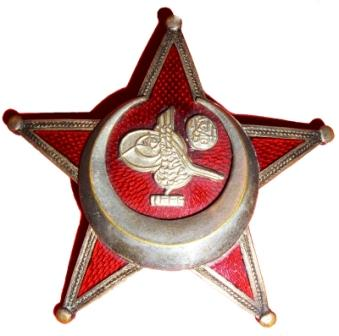
- Gallipoli Star badge.
- Type: Decoration
- Awarded for: Gallantry in battle
- Country: Ottoman Empire
- Eligibility: Troops from the Central Powers
- Campaign: Ottoman areas of engagement
- Status: Obsolete
- Established: 1 March 1915
- Ribbon bar

The Ottoman War Medal (Turkish: Harp Madalyası) was a military decoration awarded by the Ottoman Empire. It was commonly known in English as the Gallipoli Star and in German as the Eiserner Halbmond (Iron Crescent, in allusion to the Iron Cross). It was instituted by Sultan Mehmed V on 1 March 1915 for gallantry in battle. This decoration was awarded for the duration of World War I to Ottoman and other Central Powers troops, primarily in Ottoman areas of engagement.

== Design and composition ==
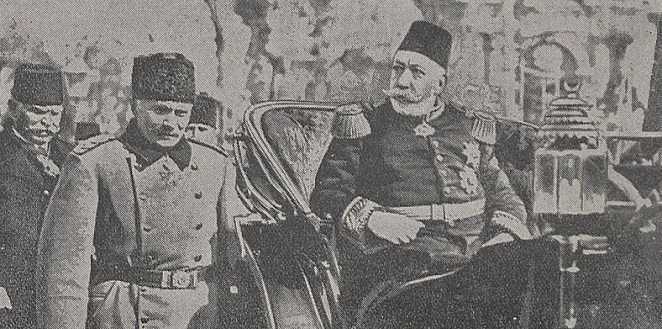
The Gallipoli Star was instituted by Mehmed V.

The award includes a badge, ribbon and campaign bar.

The medal, made of nickel-plated brass, has a vaulted star-shaped badge, 56 mm across the diagonal span of the arms. The tips of the star are capped by ball finials and enclosed in a raised silver edge with the field in red lacquer or enamel. A raised crescent, open at the top, encircles the center of the badge. Inside the crescent is the Tughra or cipher of the decoration's creator, Sultan Mehmed V Reşâd, over the date 1333 AH (AD 1915). The reverse is flat, unadorned and has a straight pin.

Along with the badge came a ribbon with red and white stripes. The dimensions of the ribbon for combatants are: red 2.5 mm; white, 5 mm.; red, 29 mm.; white, 5 mm.; red 2.5 mm. For non-combatant awardees, the colors are reversed.

The campaign bars were not originally for wear with the War Medal, but with the Imtiaz and Liakat Medals, but were often found worn on the ribbon of the War Medal. The campaign bar is a right-pointing parabola of white at 56mm in length and 7mm in height. In the field is red Arabic script denoting the specific campaign, among which were:

- Chanakkale/Chanak (Gallipoli)
- Gaza
- Kanal
- Kut-al-Amara
- Sanatorium

== Wear ==
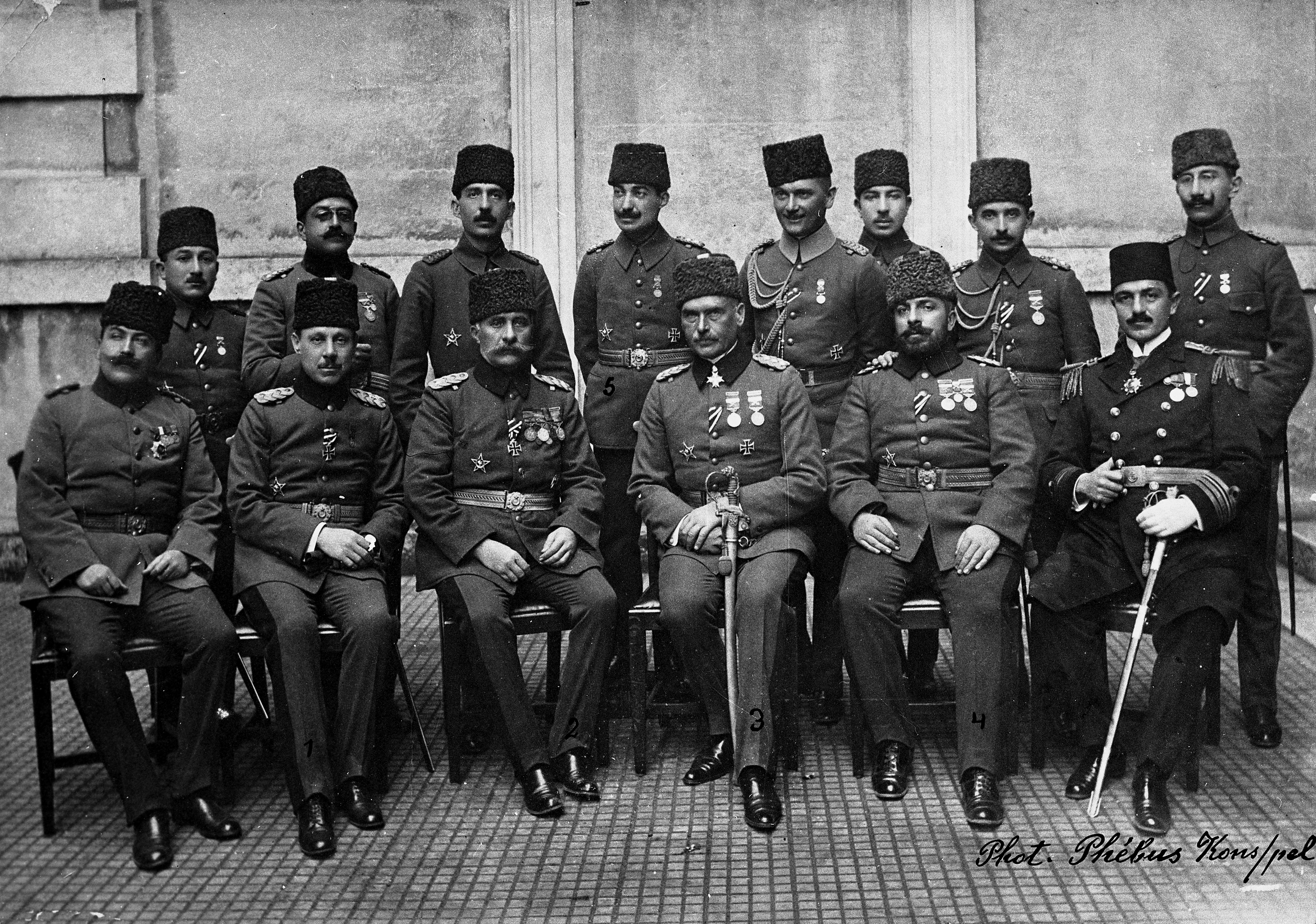
Ottoman and German officers wearing the War Medal

When in formal dress, the badge was worn at the center, below the right breast pocket. Wear of the badge was exclusive; in everyday wear was substituted by the ribbon. The ribbon was worn from the second hole in the tunic button.

For Austrian and German awardees (often members of the Asienkorps), the award took lower precedence to their own Iron Cross 2nd class, and the ribbon of the Iron Crescent was placed beneath that of the Iron Cross.

The ribbon could also be fashioned into a chest riband for placement on a ribbon bar when in undress.

The campaign bar was usually not worn.

== Notable recipients ==
=== Ottomans ===
- Şehzade Abdurrahim Hayri
- Şehzade Ahmed Nihad
- Şehzade Mehmed Abdülhalim
- Şehzade Mehmed Seyfeddin
- Şehzade Mehmed Ziyaeddin
- Şehzade Yusuf Izzeddin
- Şehzade Ömer Faruk
- Şehzade Ömer Hilmi
- Şehzade Osman Fuad
- Halit Akmansü
- Mehmet Ali Bey
- Mehmet Arif Bey
- Mehmet Atıf Ateşdağlı
- Aşir Atlı
- Hüseyin Avni Bey
- Bigalı Mehmet Çavuş
- Cemil Conk
- İbrahim Çolak
- Mehmet Tülüde Pasha
- Mehmet Emin Yazgan
- Mehmet Esat Bülkat (Mehmed Esad Pasha)
- Mehmet Nuri Conker
- Mustafa Fevzi Çakmak
- Sadullah Güney
- İsmail Hakkı Bey
- Mehmet Hayri Bey
- Kâzım İnanç
- Ethem Necdet Karabudak
- Nazif Kayacık
- Mustafa Kemal Atatürk
- Ömer Lütfi Argeşo
- Mihran Mesrobian
- Mustafa Mümin Aksoy
- Mahmut Nedim Hendek
- Arif Örgüç
- Veysel Özgür
- Ludomił Rayski
- Rüştü Pasha
- Rüştü Sakarya
- Mehmet Sabri Erçetin
- Süleyman Sabri Pasha
- Kâzım Sevüktekin
- İhsan Sökmen
- Mehmed Şefik Aker
- Mehmet Suphi Kula
- Sarkis Torossian
- Huseyn Turgut
- Münip Uzsoy
- Wehib Pasha
- Şerif Yaçağaz
- Cevat Çobanlı

=== Austro-Hungarians ===
- Archduke Charles Stephen of Austria
- Leopold Graf Berchtold von und zu Ungarschitz, Frättling und Püllütz
- Kasper Blond
- Eduard von Böhm-Ermolli
- Friedrich Freiherr von Georgi
- Johann Freiherr Haas von Haagenfels
- Baron Samu Hazai
- Miklós Horthy
- Alfred Jansa von Tannenau
- Gusztáv Jány
- Karl Freiherr von Pflanzer-Baltin
- Camillo Ruggera
- Bogusław Shashkevych
- Rudolf Stöger-Steiner Freiherr von Steinstätten
- Viktor Weber Edler von Webenau

=== Bulgarians ===
- Todor Kantardzhiev
- Panteley Kiselov
- Ivan Kolev
- Ivan Valkov
- Nikola Zhekov

=== Germans ===
- Joachim von Amsberg
- Lothar von Arnauld de la Perière
- Curt Badinski
- Rupprecht, Crown Prince of Bavaria
- Prince Alfons of Bavaria
- Prince Franz of Bavaria
- Prince Georg of Bavaria
- Prince Heinrich of Bavaria
- Prince Konrad of Bavaria
- Prince Leopold of Bavaria
- Prince Ludwig Ferdinand of Bavaria
- Johannes Blaskowitz
- Johannes Block
- Karl Bodenschatz
- Felix Graf von Bothmer
- Prince Ferdinand of Bourbon, Duke of Calabria
- Walter von Bülow-Bothkamp
- Rolf Carls
- Carl Clewing
- Theodor Croneiss
- Karl Dönitz
- Theodor Duesterberg
- Hans Ehelolf
- Waldemar Erfurth
- Alexander Freiherr von Falkenhausen
- Erich Fellgiebel
- Hellmuth Felmy
- Walter Gladisch
- Jakob Grimminger
- Hermann von Hanneken
- Otto Hartmann
- Ernst-Eberhard Hell
- Hans Ritter von Hemmer
- Waldemar Henrici
- Otto Hersing
- Wilhelm Heye
- Paul von Hindenburg
- Erich Hippke
- Johannes Hoffmann
- Rudolf Höss
- Max Immelmann
- Ernst Kantorowicz
- Rudolf Koch-Erpach
- Baron Oscar von Kohorn
- Robert Kosch
- Friedrich Freiherr Kreß von Kressenstein
- Wilhelm Ritter von Leeb
- Otto Liman von Sanders
- Ernst Lindemann
- Otto von Lossow
- Erich Lüdke
- Erich von Manstein
- Emil Meinecke
- Walter Model
- Otto von Moser
- Vincenz Müller
- Hans Heinrich XV, Prince of Pless
- Erich Prigge
- Wilhelm II, German Emperor and King of Prussia
- Erich Raeder
- Walther Reinhardt
- Lothar Freiherr von Richthofen
- Manfred Freiherr von Richthofen
- Willy Rohr
- Gerd von Rundstedt
- Gustav Schneidewind
- Otto von Schrader
- Otto Schultze
- Hans von Seeckt
- Friedrich Sixt von Armin
- Walter von Unruh
- Prince Wilhelm Karl, Duke of Urach
- Prince Wilhelm of Urach, Duke of Württemberg
- Alfred Wiener
- Helmuth Wilberg
- Ludwig Wolff
- Duke Albrecht of Württemberg
- Duke Carl Alexander of Württemberg
- Duke Philipp Albrecht of Württemberg
- Duke Robert of Württemberg

=== Persia/Iran ===
- Mohammad Taqi Pessian
- Mohammad Sadeq Kopal

=== Others ===
- Martin Ekström
- Rafael de Nogales

== Gallery ==
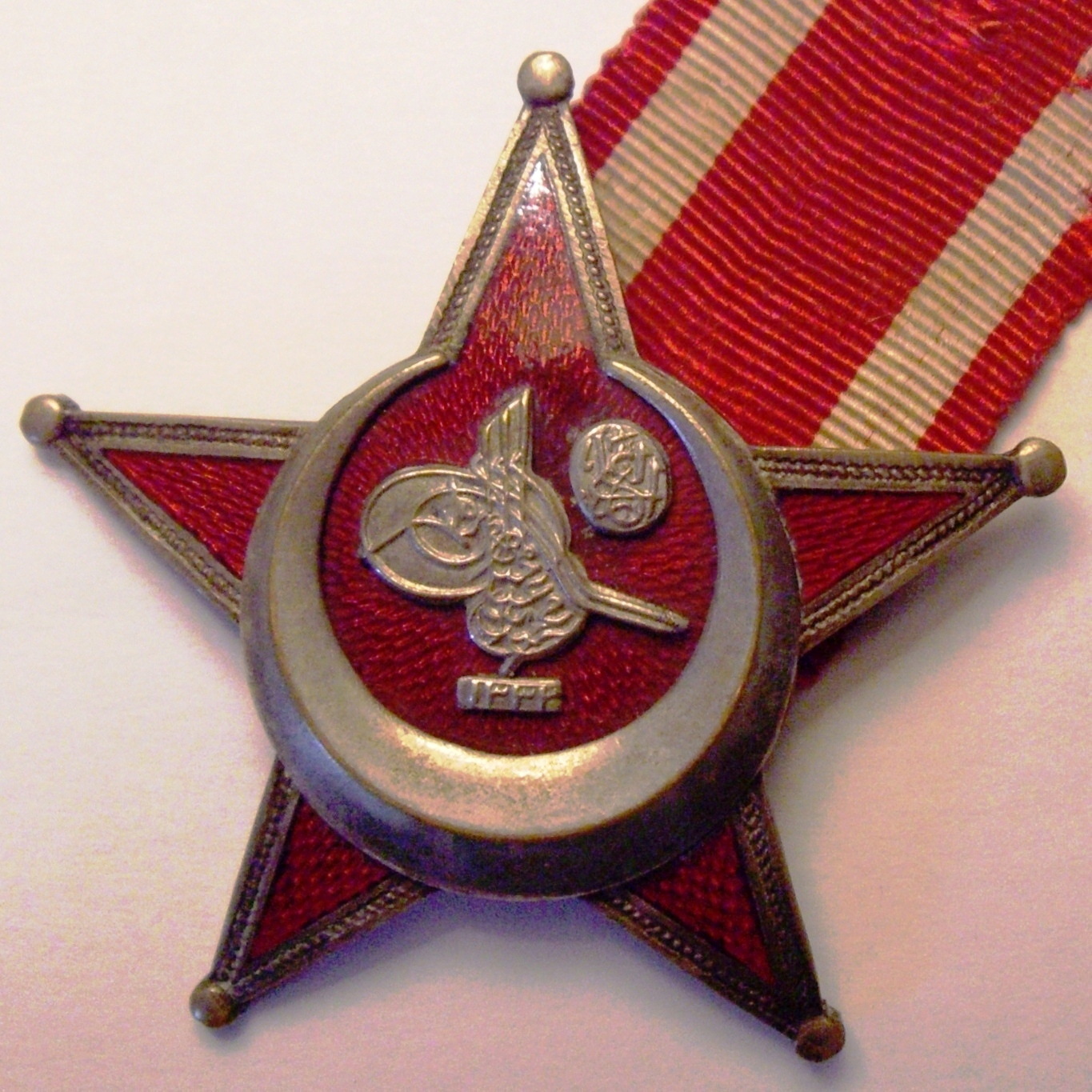
Gallipoli Star badge with ribbon

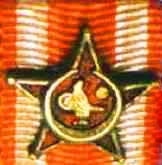
Gallipoli Star riband

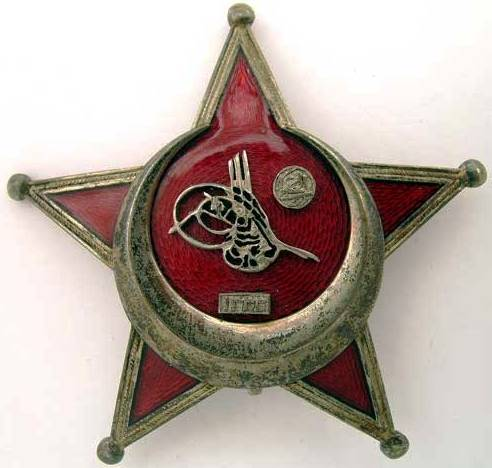
Gallipoli Star – Turkish manufacture

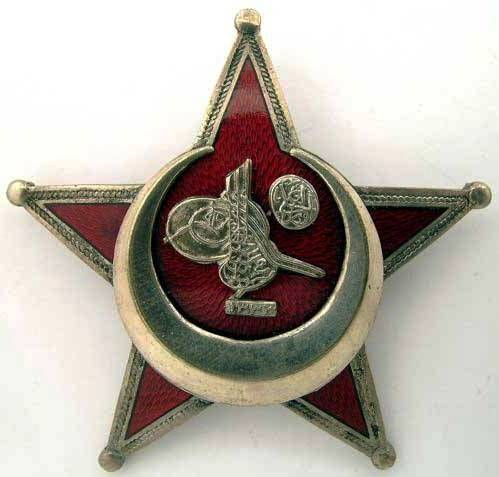
Gallipoli Star badge – B.B. & Co.

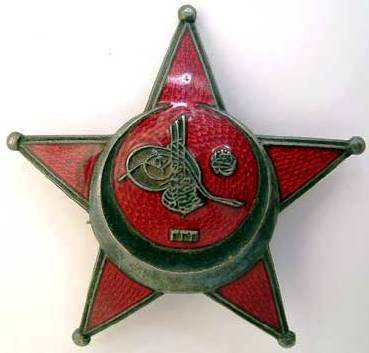
Gallipoli Star badge – Godet

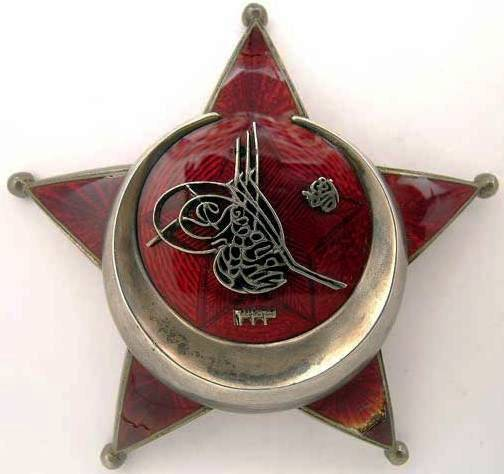
Gallipoli Star badge – J.H. Werner

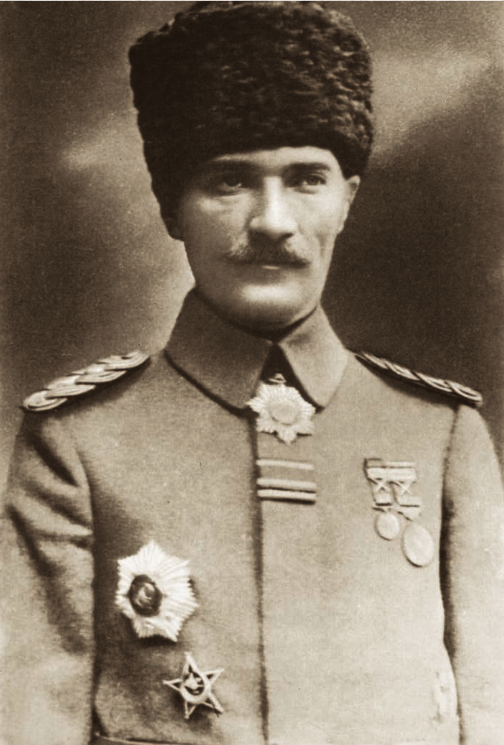
Mustafa Kemal Atatürk in 1916 with Ottoman decorations

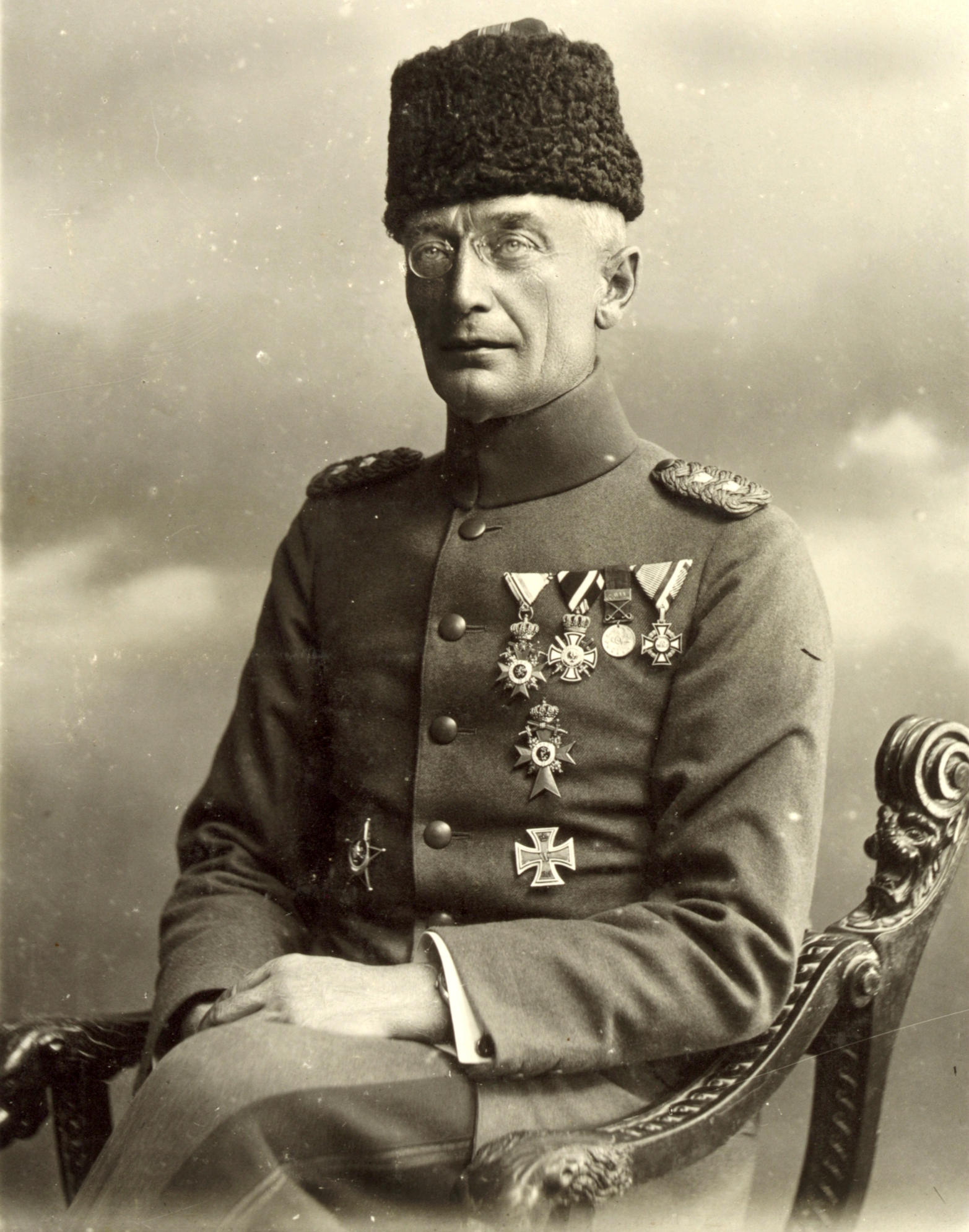
Friedrich Freiherr Kreß von Kressenstein in Ottoman uniform.

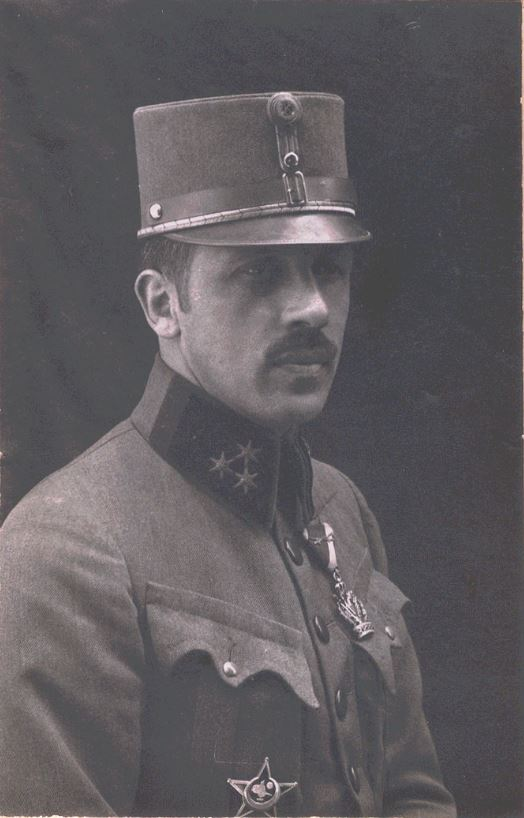
Camillo Ruggera in Austro-Hungarian uniform with Gallipoli Star.

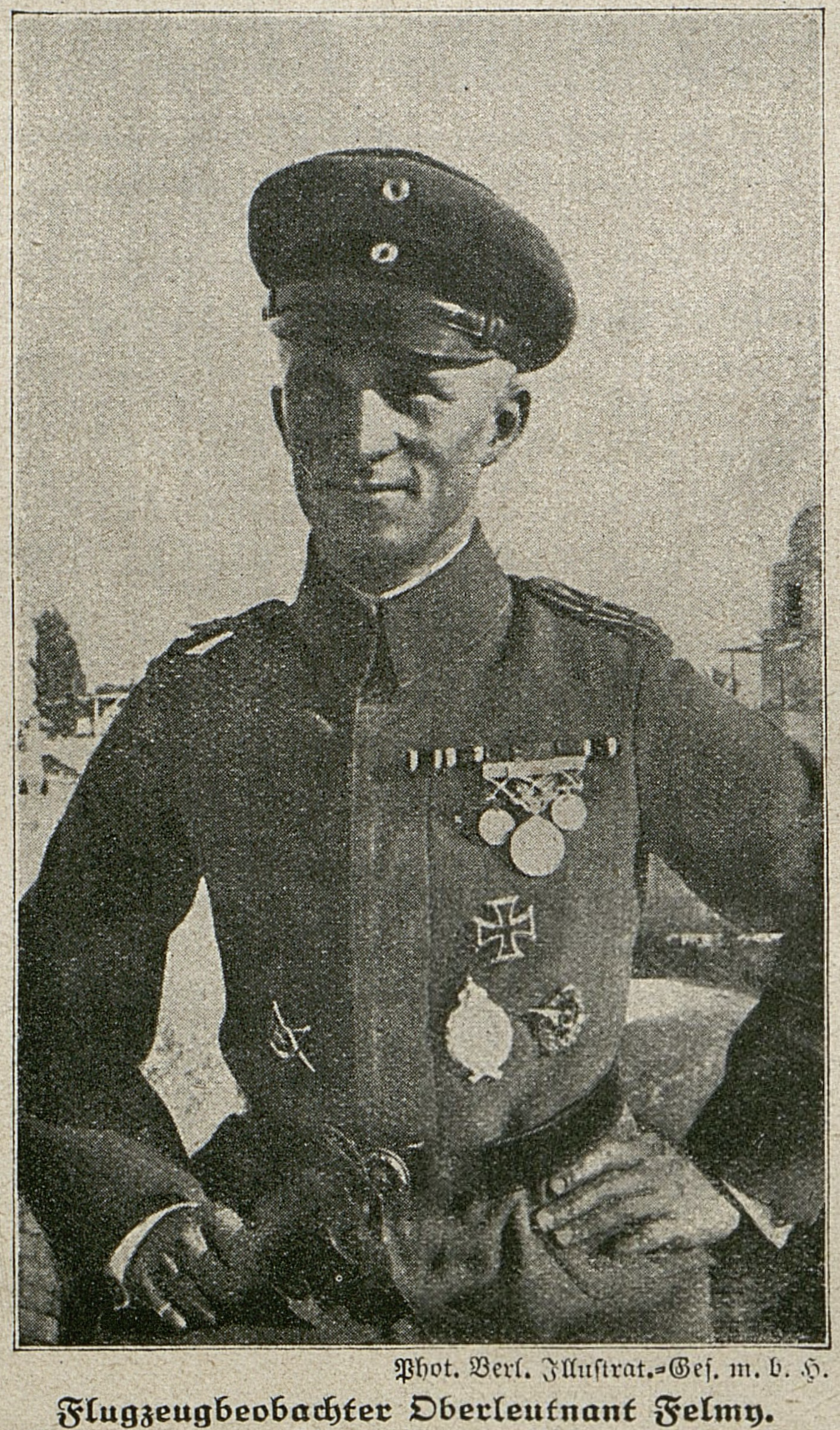
Pilot observer First Lieutenant Hellmuth Felmy (c. 1917)

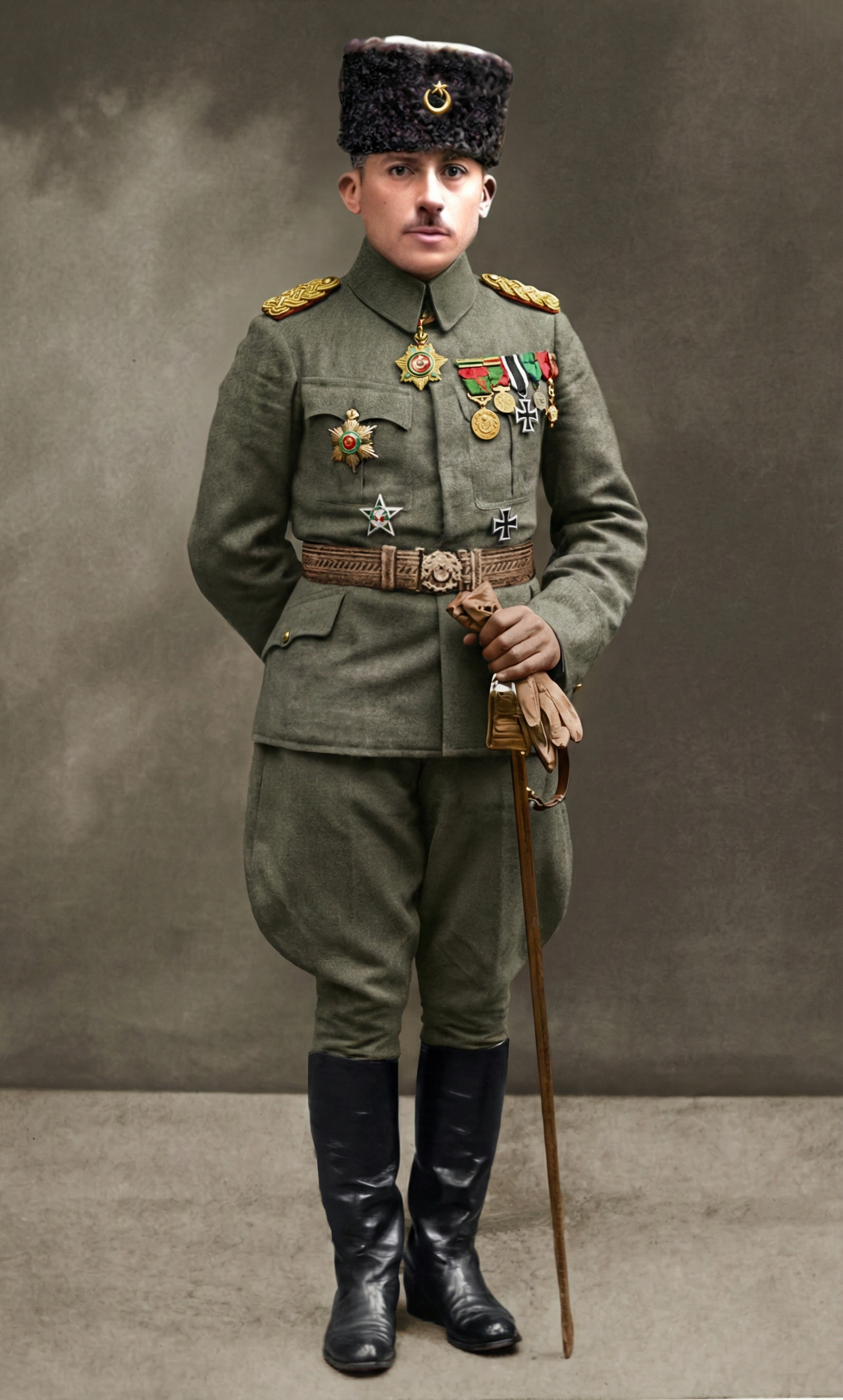
Rafael de Nogales Mendez in Otoman uniform with Gallipoli Star.

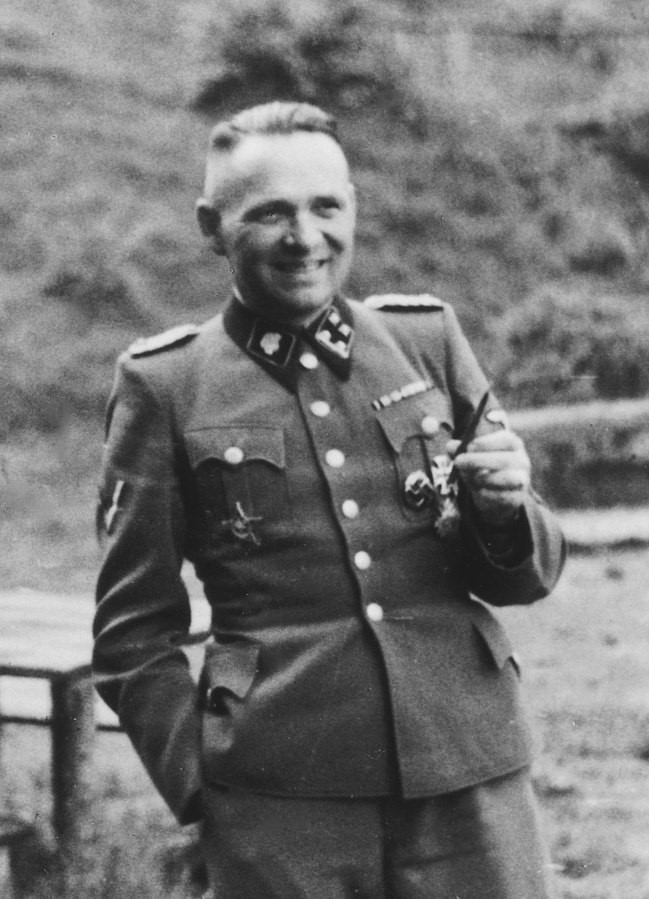
Rudolf Hoess, Auschwitz
