= Tankut Öktem =

Turkish sculptor (1941–2007)

- Born: 1941; Istanbul, Turkey
- Died: 5 December 2007 (aged 66); Istanbul, Turkey
- Known for: Ceramic, sculpture
- Awards: State Artist of Turkey
- Website: www.tankutoktem.com

Tankut Öktem (1941, Istanbul – 5 December 2007, İstanbul) was a Turkish sculptor well known especially for his monumental works.

== Early years ==
He was born 1941 in Istanbul and his childhood was spent moving from one location in Turkey to another following the successive assignments of his parents, who were veterinaries employed by the state. By his teens, he was already recognized as a child prodigy in sculpture and painting, and he concentrated on the former discipline after his enrollment in the ceramics branch of Istanbul State College of Fine and Applied Arts (Turkish: İstanbul Devlet Tatbiki Güzel Sanatlar Yüksek Okulu). While at the third grade of the school, he received the first prize in a "World Contest for Young Sculptors". He completed his training in Germany at Porzellanfabrik Schönwald in 1962.

== Career ==
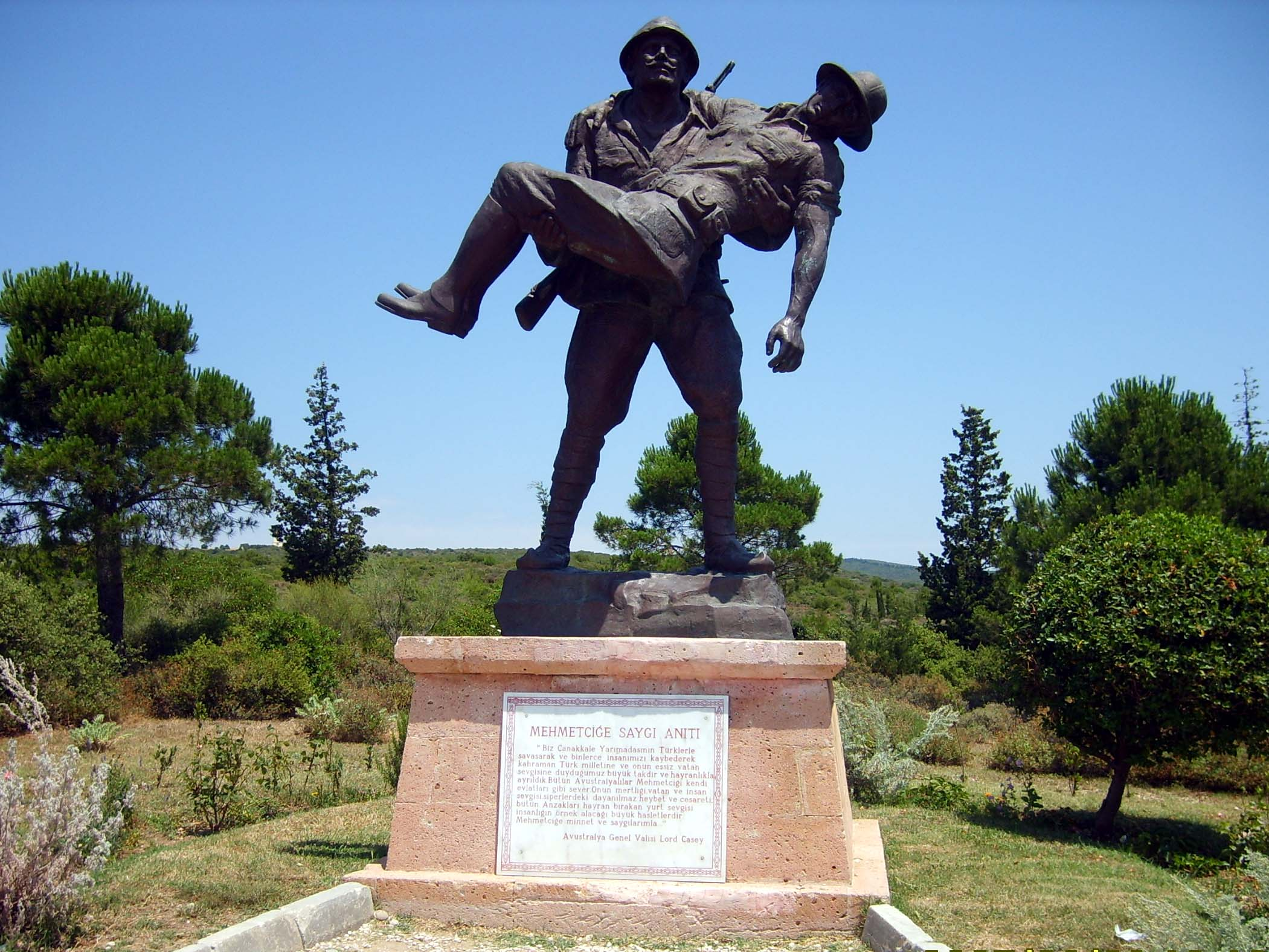
Respect to Mehmetçik by Öktem

After graduating in 1965, he became an assistant the next year in the same institution, where he was educated pursuing a teacher's career. In 1970, he was admitted to the teaching staff. The institution became Faculty of Fine Arts at Marmara University in 1983. Oktem established the Sculpture Department and became professor in 1986.

Tankut Öktem became well known in Turkey after the 1970s, especially with monumental works of Atatürk or the Turkish War of Independence as theme, and which are remarkable especially with their high number of figurines. In 1999, he was awarded the title State Artist by the Turkish government. He created a bust of Atatürk in Budapest, Hungary and a victory monument in Libya in addition to numerous statues and monuments in Northern Cyprus and Turkey. He is also holder of various awards at home and abroad.

His workshop at Küçükkumla village in Gemlik, Bursa Province was burnt down in 2006.

== Death ==
Tankut Öktem died on 5 December 2007 in a traffic accident in Üsküdar, İstanbul, at which also his wife and daughter Pınar were injured. His corpse was transferred to Küçükkumlu, where he was laid to rest in the family grave. He was survived by his wife Semra Öktem and daughters Pınar Öktem Doğan and Oylum Öktem İşözen.
