= Kasper Blond =

Austrian surgeon

- Born: Kaspar Blond; 10 July 1889; Czernowitz, Duchy of Bukovina, Austro-Hungarian Empire
- Died: 20 September 1964 (aged 75); London, United Kingdom
- Citizenship: Austrian, later British
- Education: University of Vienna
- Occupations: Surgeon, writer
- Military career
- Allegiance: Austria-Hungary, German Empire
- Rank: Leutnant

Signature
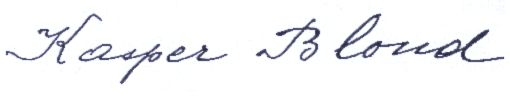

Kasper Blond (July 10, 1889 – September 20, 1964) was an Austrian surgeon, inventor and writer who proposed an alternative theory of cancer.

== Early life ==
Blond was born in Czernowitz, Duchy of Bukovina, in the Austro-Hungarian Empire on 10 July 1889, to a middle-class Jewish family. He had two brothers, Adolf and Kelman. Adolf later emigrated with him to the United Kingdom, and Kelman was executed in an extermination camp during The Holocaust.

== First World War ==
=== Capture ===
Blond's journey from 1914 to 1918 (with modern-day borders)

On July 1 1913, Blond finished his military service as a one-year volunteer, being part of the Imperial and Royal Infantry, 41st division. He joined the Czernowitz garrison hospital as an assistant surgeon on 9 August 1914, becoming an officer in the medical corps with rank Fähnrich. With the beginning of the First World War, on 24 September Blond was taken captive by the forces of the Russian Empire as they invaded and occupied the area. The Austrian Army had left the area moving north, Blond was left with the Czernowitz hospital. After his capture, Blond was taken as a prisoner of war alongside twenty-two other medics – they passed through Kyiv (27 September), Samara, and Orenburg by train; German soldiers were sent to Siberia, and Austrians to Turkestan. Blond was sent through Tashkent (7 October), Samarkand (9 October), and Bukhara (10 October) until he was sent to a camp in Ashgabat, Turkmenistan.

At the camp, prisoners were separated by race: Slavs received the best treatment, and Jews the worst; Blond was housed in a hut without bedding. In Ashgabat, he worked as a doctor in the city hospital, as requested by a Russian medic general. This gave him relative freedom as compared to other prisoners; he had free movement in the city, and was allowed communication with the civil service. He also communicated with doctors in Europe about local diseases. Due to the terrible living conditions – prisoners regularly died from diseases such as dysentery and malaria, and were buried in unmarked grave in the woods – Blond raised the money to hire a Persian trafficker with three others, including two doctors.

=== Escape ===
Escaping the camp on 15 November 1915, Blond crossed the Turkmen steppe with a guide, crossing into the Iranian province of Khorasan. This journey involved traversing the Turkmen-Khorasan Mountain Range overnight in civilian clothes, arriving in a town in Khorasan at midnight. From Khorasan, Blond's party headed south-west, eventually arriving in a small villages. Upon hearing that the party included doctors, many of the villagers came up to them to show them their illnesses. Sleeping in the house of a local family, continued travelling to the place of the area's anti-Russian governor, accompanied by the son of a local Khan whom they met. Initially, Blond's party were put under house arrest on suspicion of espionage, but were later set free with mules. In Tabar, Blond was suspected of being a Russian, and was forced to flee, crossing the Dasht-e Kavir, again staying with a local governor until 20 November. Near Damghan, Blond and his companions were chased by Cossack troops until Dowlatabad; the Russian empire had stationed Cossacks, particularly in the Persian Cossack Brigade, in Central Asia since the late 19th Century.

On November 30, they arrived in Tehran, disguised as Turkmen, and reported to the Austrian military attaché there, and joining an Austrian detachment. However, due to the threat of a Russian invasion of Tehran, Blond quickly left the city and travelled to Qom, where he joined a German detachment under Max Otto Schünemann, and was involved in the fighting of the Persian campaign. With the German Army, Blond moved from Qom through Kashan and Isfahan, over the Zagros Mountains into Eastern Lorestan. The Russian Army had been pursuing the German troops since Isfahan, so they were forced to continue through Nahavand until they reached Sahneh. By this point, much of the detachment was suffering from frostbite and malaria, and Blond treated soldiers in the field hospital there. After this, they moved to Kermanshah, where the detachment was dissolved. After treating Turkish troops in a military hospital in Mahidasht, Blond succumbed to lice and was taken to Baghdad for treatment, where he was afflicted by cutaneous leishmaniasis. After recovery, he travelled through Ottoman Syria, and saw victims of the Armenian genocide in Aleppo in the spring of 1916, later writing:

Ich hatte keine Veranlassung für die Armenier Stellung zu nehmen und wusste was ihnen die Türken zur Last legten. Ja, ich gebe zu, dass viele Armenier an ihrem Stiefvaterlande das, was man Verrat nennt, geübt hatten. Aber können Menschen das Elend, die Qualen und Torturen, die ihren Frauen und Kindern zugefügt wurden, vergessen? ... Bei meiner Ankunft in Aleppo erhob ich bei unserem Konsul flammenden Protest gegen diese Behandlung unschuldiger Frauen und Kinder.... gab er mir den freundschaftlichen Rat, dieses Thema vor Türken nicht zu berühren, wenn ich heil zu den Meinen heimkehren wolle.
.I had no reason to stand with the Armenians' position and knew what the Turks accused them of. Yes, I concede that many Armenians had committed so-called treason unto their motherland. But can people forget the misery, pain, and torture inflicted on their wives and children? ... When I arrived in Aleppo, I strongly protested this treatment of innocent women and children to the consul... he gave me the friendly advice not to touch this topic in front of Turks if I wanted to return safely to my family.

From Aleppo, Blond travelled on the Anatolian Railway through Adana, Konya, Eskişehir, and Pera, and travelled to Constantinople by steamship. Hereafter, he moved through Sofia and Niš, stopping in each city to complete formalities. In Niš, Blond and his companions wanted to take an express train to Belgrade; the Austrian representative tried to stop them on the basis that the train was for the exclusive use of German holidaymakers in Macedonia, but conceded to let them travel after negotiations with Blond.

Blond returned to Vienna in July 1916; upon his arrival, he stayed at the Austrian Ministry of War for five days as the officials did not know how to deal with him: as a former prisoner of war, volunteer in the German Army, or as a deserter; he was released and sent to the convalescence centre. In Vienna, he met with his father – his mother had died during the war – and wrote drafts of a memoir about his travels before finishing his medical studies at the University of Vienna, where he graduated M.D. in 1917. By 1917, he had advanced to the rank of Leutnant, and was sent to Palestine because of his knowledge of infectious and tropical diseases; he stayed there until the end of the war.

=== Ein Unbekannter Krieg ===
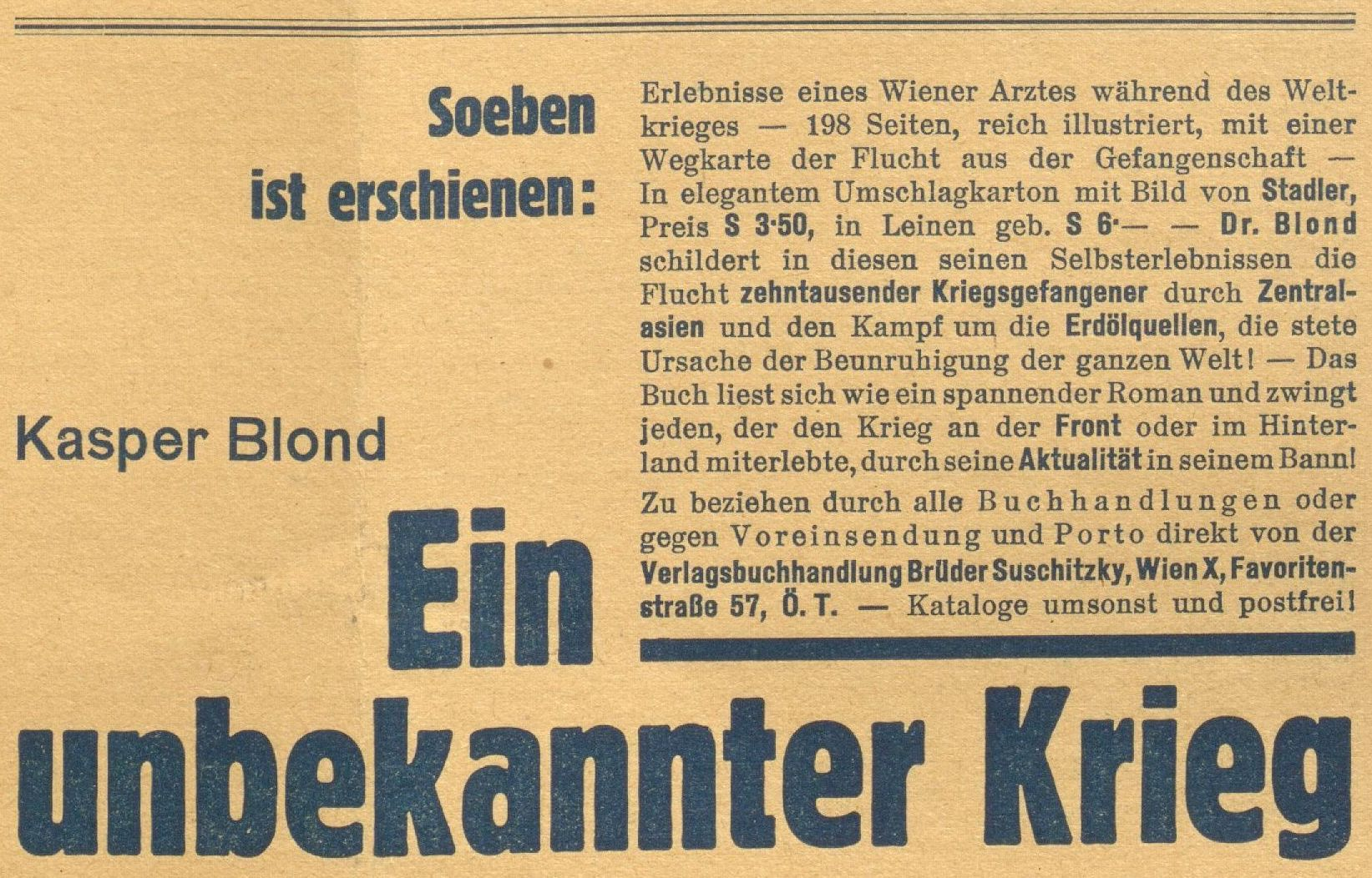
Clipping from the Österreichische Illustrierte Zeitung advertising Ein Unbekannter Krieg

Ein Unbekannter Krieg, a memoir of Blond's time in Central Asia and return to Vienna, was originally published in 1931 in Vienna; an edition with a foreword by Peter Jung was published in 1997. After his return, Blond gave several talks about his experiences and published this work as the first part of a supposedly two-volume memoir; however, a second part never published. A manuscript for the second volume existed in the late 1950s, according to Jung's research. Annette Lechner views the work as being an example of the rise of pacifist-themed literature in the aftermath of the First World War.

== Career ==
After Blond received his M.D. from the University of Vienna, he worked as a surgeon in the city at several hospitals, including the Vienna General Hospital. After the Anschluss, Blond was forced to flee Austria, and settled in the United Kingdom. Qualifying as a Licentiate of the Royal College of Physicians and of the Royal Faculty of Physicians and Surgeons in Glasgow in 1940, Blond was a senior surgeon at Whipps Cross University Hospital until 1943. He worked afterwards as a surgeon on Harley Street.

In 1923, Blond and Hans Heidler (1889–1955) invented the Blond–Heidler saw, an obstetric tool used to remove a dead fetus. The saw has been used in cases of fetal decapitation without maternal trauma. Blond had researched the bile duct and liver pathology; he published his in the Archiv für Klinische Chirurgie between 1928 and 1930.

=== Cancer theory ===
In 1950, he co-authored the book The Liver: Porta Malorum, which proposed the hypothesis that many diseases and disorders such as allergies, cholecystitis, nephritis, jaundice, piles are caused by a malfunctioning liver. Their hypothesis was described as too dogmatic by critics. A review in the California Medicine journal noted that "as soon as they present their principal hypothesis, they speak like religious fanatics with a body of dogma to be taken on faith without support of scientific fact."

Blond developed a theory of cancer which he wrote about in his book The Liver and Cancer, first published in 1954 with a second edition in 1960. Blond argued that the basis of all malignant disease is a mutation of somatic tissues caused by chronic liver damage. He believed that 98% of all cancers in adults are of alimentary origin. His hypothesis was that cancer is a nutritional disease and is caused by liver damage.

Blond believed that cancer treatment requires the healing of liver damage. He argued that if the liver detoxifies correctly then cancer cannot develop because it thrives only on toxic products of digestion. His suggestions of treatment opposed any radiation therapy or surgery. He regarded "cancer prevention, a problem of dietary control" and recommended a vegetarian diet as therapy. He cited cases of cancer patients being successfully treated with vegetable juices, yoghurt, raw vegetables and fruit. Bond stated that "only a lacto-vegetarian diet, being rich in alkalis, reduces the acidity of the blood and prevents all disease."

Pathologist J. H. O. Earle in The British Medical Journal noted that:

It is, however, doubtful, if many will be impressed by Blond's new theory. He believes that the basis of all malignant disease is a mutation of somatic tissues caused by chronic liver damage. This damage, the termination of which may be cirrhosis, varies in degree, and up to a certain stage is a reversible process. It results in failure to detoxicate metabolic products derived from the alimentary canal, so that "nutritional toxins" gain access to the circulation. These "nutritional toxins" are responsible for the mutations which lead to the malignant growth... Blond's theory is hypothetical speculation entirely lacking scientific proof, without which it can only be detrimental to the solution of the cancer problem.

Physician Louis Lasagna negatively reviewed the book, stating that it promoted his theory that cancer is due to a sick liver but that was about all and it was "rather a disjointed and unconvincing bit of hobbyhorse riding". Physician Grant E. Ward who reviewed the book, stated that further research was needed to prove if "nutritional toxins" cause cancer but his hypothesis was impressive enough to warrant study.

=== Personal life ===
Blond died in London, aged 75 after an illness.

== Honours and awards ==
Ribbon bar	Award	Country	Presented	Ref.
	Medal for Bravery	Austria-Hungary	1917	
	Iron Cross, Class 2.	Austria-Hungary	1917	
	Gallipoli Star	Ottoman Empire	1917	
	Order of the Medjidie, Class 5.	Ottoman Empire	1917	

== List of Works ==
- Haemorrhoids And Their Treatment: The Varicose Syndrome Of The Rectum (1940)
- The Liver: Porta Malorum (The Gateway to Disease) (with David Haler, 1950)
- The Liver and Cancer: A New Cancer Theory (with a foreword by E. Stanley Lee, 1960)
