= Respect to Mehmetçik Monument =

Tribute to Turkish soldiers at Gallipoli

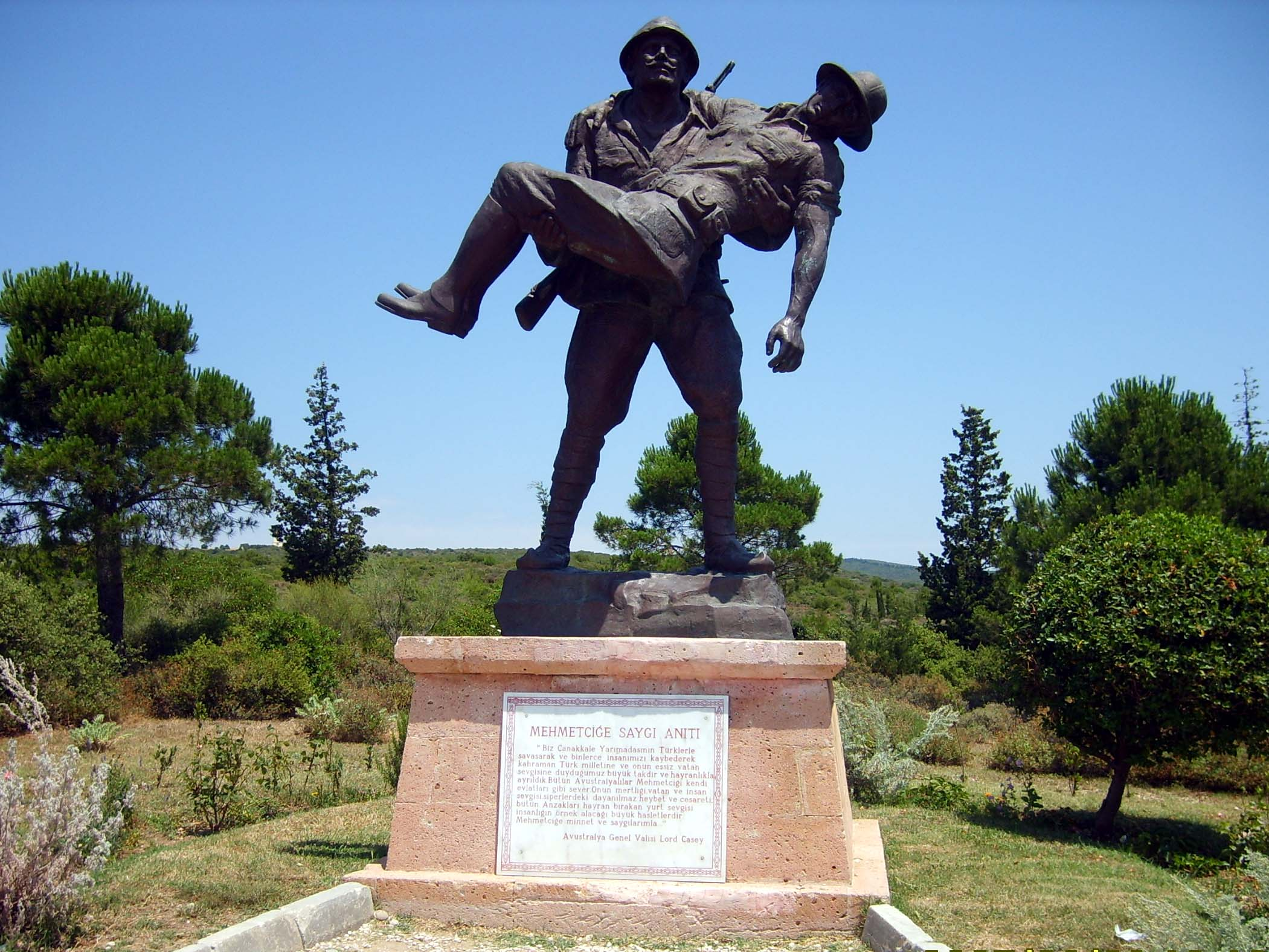
- Interactive map of Respect to Mehmetçik Monument
- Location: Eceabat, Çanakkale Province, Turkey
- Coordinates: 40°12′N 26°17′E
- Designer: Tankut Öktem
- Type: Statue
- Material: Bronze
- Opening date: 1997; 29 years ago
- Dedicated to: Turkish soldier at Gallipoli Campaign

The Respect to Mehmetçik Memorial (Turkish: Mehmetçiğe Saygı Anıtı) is a monument in the Gallipoli peninsula, Çanakkale Province, Turkey. It is located in the Eceabat district of Çanakkale Province in the southern end of Albayrak heights within the Gallipoli Peninsula Historical Site which is facing the Anzac Cove. Mehmetçik is a common name given to soldiers in a war, akin to G.I. in the US.

== History ==
The monument, which was created by the Turkish sculptor Tankut Öktem (1941–2007) in 1997, is a sculpture of a Turkish soldier carrying an Australian officer. The sculpture is based on an event in the Gallipoli campaign of World War I in which a Turkish soldier, after raising a white flag, carried a wounded Australian officer to Australian lines and returned to his lines before fighting resumed. There is also an inscription of a statement made by Lord Richard Casey, then a lieutenant and the staff captain with the 3rd Brigade in the Australian army, during a visit to Turkey about his respect for the Turkish army.

The inscription at the bottom reads: “We left the Gallipoli Peninsula fighting against the Turks and losing thousands of people but with a great admiration and appreciation for the Turkish nation and its unmatched love for its country. All Australians love Mehmetcik as if they are their own sons. Their bravery, love for its country and people, their irresistible majesty and courage in the trenches, and their love for their country is admired by all Anzacs and those are traits which should be taken as an example by all humanity. With gratitude and respect to Mehmetçik…. Australian Governor General Lord Casey 1967”.
