= Bigalı Mehmet Çavuş =

Sergeant of the Ottoman (Turkish) Army during World War I

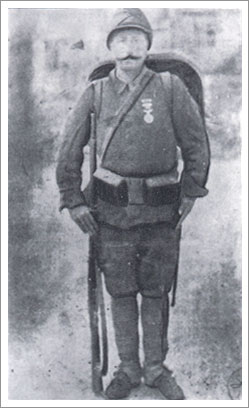
- Born: 1878; Plovdiv, Bulgaria
- Died: 3 February 1964 (aged 86); Bahçeli village, Biga, Çanakkale, Turkey
- Military career
- Allegiance: Ottoman Empire
- Branch: Ottoman Army
- Rank: Sergeant
- Nickname: Mehmetçik
- Units: 10th Company, 3rd Battalion, 27th Regiment of the 9th Division
- Conflicts: Balkan Wars, Gallipoli campaign (World War I)
- Awards: Ottoman War Medal

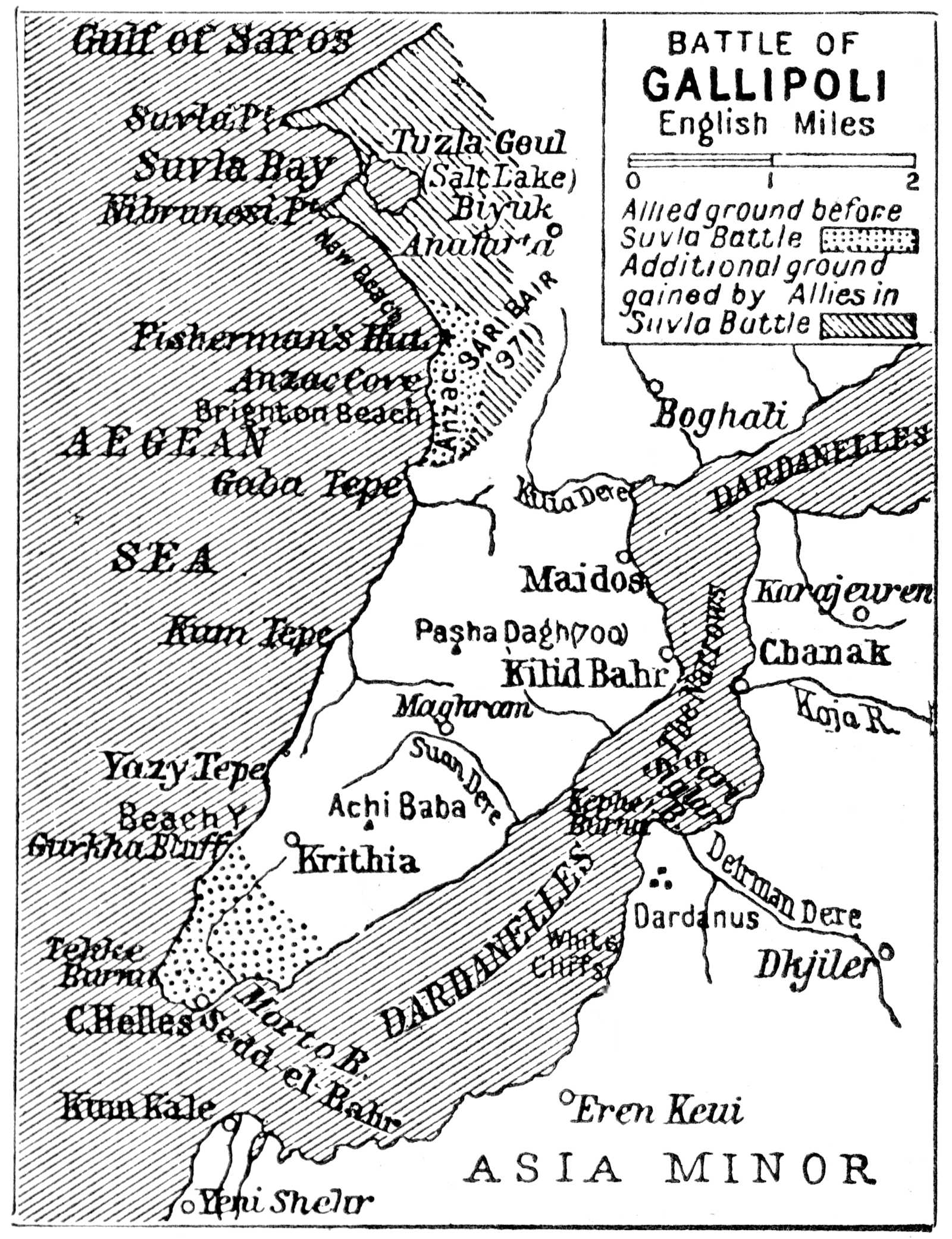
Map of the Gallipoli Campaign in 1915.

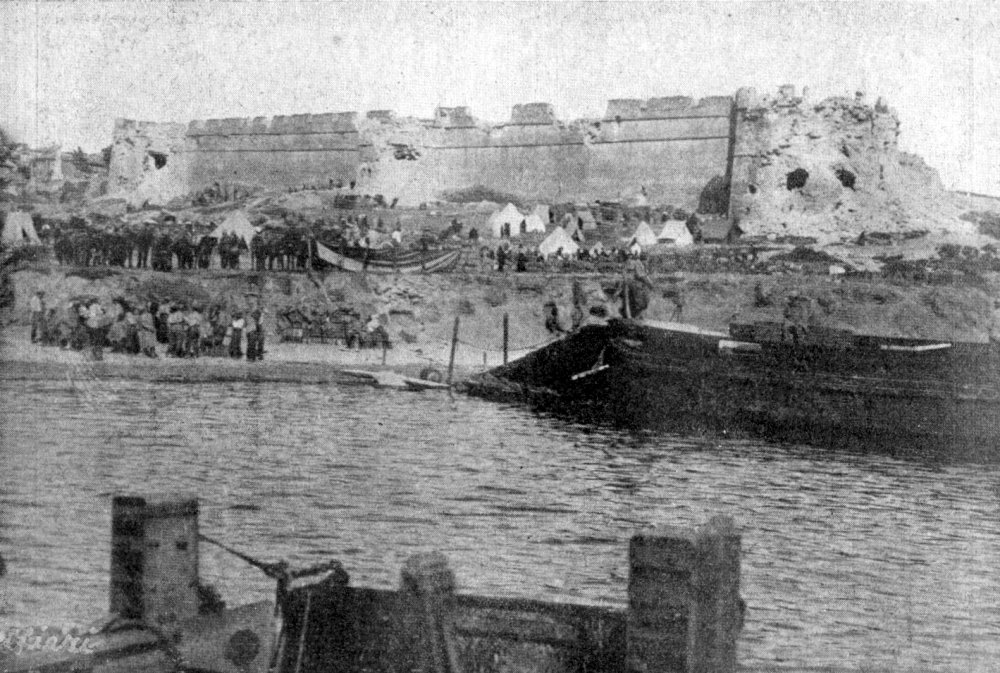
Fort of Seddülbahir in 1915 seen from the sea.

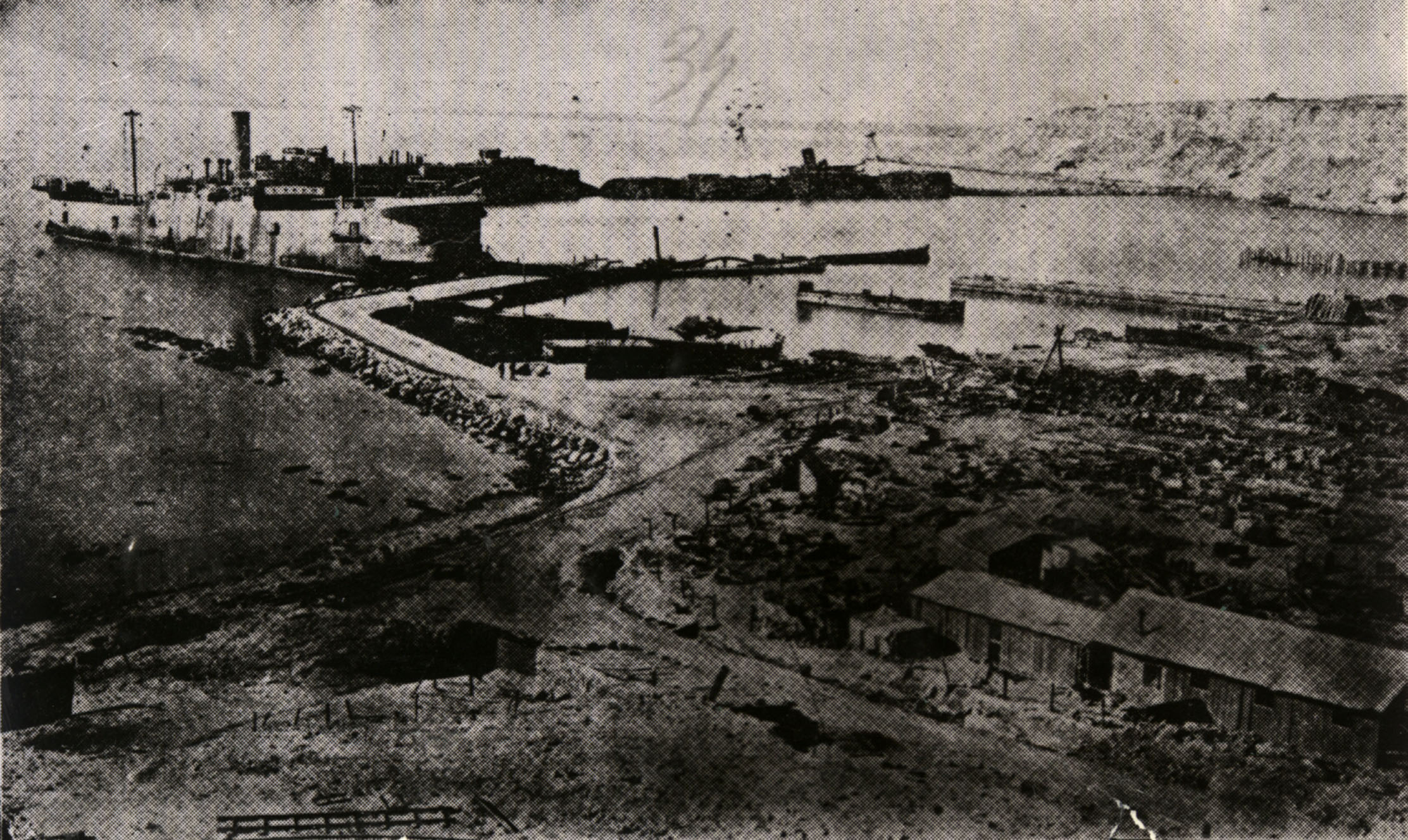
British landing at Seddülbahir during the Gallipoli Campaign in 1915.

Bigalı Mehmet Çavuş (1878 – 3 February 1964; literally "Sergeant Mehmet of Biga") was an Ottoman Army sergeant, who fought during the Gallipoli Campaign of World War I. He is remembered as a hero, and is considered to be the eponym of the common name "Mehmetçik" used for a Turkish soldier.

== Early life ==
He was born in Plovdiv, Bulgaria in 1878.

During the Russo-Turkish War (which saw Russians taking Plovdiv on 16 January 1878), Mehmet's family emigrated to Anatolia, and settled in Bahçeli village of Biga, Çanakkale in the Ottoman Empire.

He participated in the Balkan Wars.

== Battle ==
Sgt. Mehmet took part in the Gallipoli Campaign (1915–1916), stationed at the beach in front of the Sedd el Bahr Fort (Turkish: Seddülbahir Kalesi) and artillery batteries on the Gallipoli Peninsula. He fought against the landing of the Allied army. At 14:45 local time on March 4, 1915, a fleet consisting of five dreadnoughts and seven torpedo boats of the Allies of World War I bombarded Seddülbahir. They landed sixty troops in three boats at Seddülbahir from a battleship under the shield of machine gun fire to capture the Ottoman fortifications in order to secure the passage of their naval forces through the Dardanelles. Although the artillery batteries in Seddülbahir were evacuated by the Ottomans, a squad led by Bigalı Mehmet Çavuş was deployed to the Seddülbahir Fort. The formation was part of the 10th Company, 3rd Battalion, 27th Regiment of the 9th Division commanded by Colonel Halil Sami Bey, who was responsible for the defense of the area. The 30 Ottoman soldiers were armed by rifle and grenade only. During the three-hour-long fierce battle, the Ottomans continuously changed their positions in the fort, giving an impression of being stronger in numbers than they actually were. No more Allied troop landing took place due to this tactic. During the battle, Sgt. Mehmet's rifle barrel broke into pieces, so he threw his broken rifle at the enemy, and instead started to attack them with stones. This attack caused Sgt. Mehmet to be wounded in the head and on the right chest. When his comrades saw Sgt. Mehmet fighting with stones, they broke cover and began to fire openly. Finally, the invading Allied troops retreated to their battleships following a bayonet charge launched by the Turks. As the Ottoman reserve force came to the scene in the evening, there were 6 dead, 13 wounded among the Ottoman soldiers, and only 12 left were capable to keep up with any fight.

== Aftermath ==
Lieutenant colonel Mustafa Kemal, commander of the 19th Division at Haraptepe, sent a report to Cevat Pasha, commander of the Dardanelles fortifications, and asked him to award Sgt. Mehmet with a medal. Vice Commander-in-chief Enver Pasha visited Sgt. Mehmet at the military hospital in Çanakkale, and decorated him with the Ottoman War Medal.

Sgt. Mehmet served sixteen years in the army. Later, he lived a modest life in Bahçeli village of Biga in Çanakkale Province; refusing financial assistance as he had fought for his country and not for money. He died at age 86 on 3 February 1964, and was buried next to his wife's grave in his village.

== Legacy ==
A similar war medal is on display in the "Bigalı Mehmet Çavuş Arts Gallery". It is considered that the common name "Mehmetçik" (literally "Little Mehmet") for an Ottoman or a Turkish soldier was coined after him. In 2017, his burial site was transformed into a monumental grave, and a war gallery was established next to it. Some high-ranked military officers and local politicians have visited his grave to pay their respects. He is remembered as a hero.
