= Digger slang =

Australian military slang

Digger slang, also known as ANZAC slang or Australian military slang, is Australian English slang as employed by the various Australian armed forces throughout the 20th and 21st centuries. There have been four major sources of the slang: the First World War, the Second World War, the Korean War and the Vietnam War. The name Digger slang derives from the cultural stereotype of the Digger in the First World War. Graham Seal AM, Professor of Folklore at Curtin University of Technology, calls the slang Diggerese. It is a combination of an occupational jargon and an in-group argot.

== First World War ==
The first influence on Digger slang was Australia's involvement in the First World War. The soldiers themselves were not called Diggers until well into the war, the name first entering common use around 1917, with the first recorded use in something other than the traditional goldmining sense occurring in 1916. Originally, they were known as "Anzacs" after the abbreviation ANZAC for the Australian and New Zealand Army Corps, a name that quickly entered the mainstream lexicon and was even the subject of federal legislation within a year of its coinage. The War Precautions Act forbade the use of "ANZAC" in the name of any private residence, boat, vehicle, or charitable institution, on penalty of a £100 fine or six months in prison. The Australian government even petitioned the British government to enact similar restrictions.

The men of the Australian Imperial Force, and the women who nursed them, coined many words of Digger slang, including "Blighty" for Great Britain (it being the name for a wound severe enough to get one returned to Britain for hospitalization), "chocolate soldiers" (and thence "chocs") for soldiers who were believed to be unwilling to fight, and "six-bob-a-day tourists" for the soldiers themselves (a reference to their daily wages of six shillings).

As well as gaining slang versions of many French words from the areas in which the soldiers fought, such as "naipoo" for "no way" (taken from the French "il n'y a plus"), "tray bon" (from "très bon", and from which other Digger slang words such as "bonsterina" and "bontosher" were in turn derived), "plonk" (from "vin blanc") for cheap wine, and "cushy" for "easy"; the soldiers also incorporated Arabic words learned at their training grounds in Egypt, such as "saieeda" for "goodbye" and "imshi" for "go", and, most notably "bint" for a woman (who were also called "tabbies"). One slang phrase, going "to the top of the Wazir" derives its meaning, of doing something to excess, from a troop riot in the red light district Cairo on Good Friday 1915, over the prices being charged by prostitutes and the rumour that they were intentionally infecting the men with sexually transmitted diseases.

Many military-related words and phrases were also coined. The slang name "daisy-cutter", for an anti-personnel bomb, originated with Anzac slang, for example. Soldiers lived in "dugouts", fired from "possies" (positions), and fought against "Johnny Turk" or "Jacko". And they suffered from the "Gallipoli Gallop", dysentery. Like the U.S. Navy's "scuttlebutt", rumours shared amongst soldiers around the water-wagons, manufactured by Furphy & Sons, were known as "Furphys".

Some of the slang originated in the street slang of the larrikin pushes, such as "stoush" for "fight", which led to such words as "reinstoushments" for reinforcements. One of the essential components of the slang was the prolific (for the time) use of swearwords.

Much of this slang was collected by W. H. Downing in his book Digger Dialects, which was published in 1919 (and reprinted in 1990).

== Second World War ==
The second influence on Digger slang was Australia's involvement in the Second World War. Some of the soldiers who had fought in the First World War perpetuated Digger slang into the second. These "retreads" were fit enough to return to action and continued the use of terms such as "bint", "backsheesh" for money, "shoofti" for a look around (borrowed via British slang from Arabic), and "guts" for news and information.

Several slang words and phrases evolved. What in the First World War had been a "base bludger", someone who hangs around headquarters avoiding the fighting (from "bludger", a British slang name for a pimp, and generally adopted as the name for any form of layabout), became a "base walloper" (also known as "fountain pen fusilier"), for example. Similarly, several new slang words and phrases appeared. A "shiny arse" was someone with a desk job at headquarters, and a "blue pencil warrior" was a propagandist.

Many slang phrases were expressions of malcontent, such as "wouldn't it root ya?!", an expression of disgust, which came in many Bowdlerized variations, from "wouldn't it rotate yer?!" to "wouldn't it rot your socks?!". The shortened version of this, "wouldn't it?!" is still in use today. Anything thought to be nonsense was "a lot of cock" (sometimes "a lot of hot cock"). Something that was useless was "as much use as a cuntful of cold piss" (or "not worth a cuntful of cold water"), and a malfunctioning piece of equipment was "cactus" (originally 1940s RAAF slang, and briefly revived in the 1980s). Other Digger slang expressions involving complaint and error were "whinge", "balls-up", and "upter" (a contraction of "up to shit"). Food was called "afterbirth", a cook was a "bait layer", a quartermaster a "q bastard", and a sergeant's mess a "snake pit". Someone who wanted to "give the game to the blacks" was expressing unhappiness with the army or the war.

One significant source of slang were the prisoner of war camps run by the Japanese, where Diggers sometimes ended up. These were the sources of many particularly strong expressions, such as "white nip" for a prisoner who collaborated with the Japanese, and "japs", "nips", "jeeps", "little yellow men", and "little yellow bastards" for the Japanese themselves. In the camps, "kippers" were the British POWs, and "cheese-eaters" the Dutch. The urinals were "pissaphones" and the stew served to prisoners was "Danube", a contraction of the rhyming slang "Blue Danube".

There were many other Digger slang words and phrases coined during the Second World War. Two of the most notable are "wheelbarrow" for a conscript (because he had to be pushed) and "doover", a general name for just about anything at all. Others include "snarlers", who were soldiers from the Middle East who were "SNLR" ("Services No Longer Required") and sent home on "three P boats" (troopships that contained "pox, prisoners, and provosts").

== Korean and Vietnam Wars ==
The third influence on Digger slang were Australia's involvement in the Korean War and its involvement in the Vietnam War. As with the Second World War, much of the slang was carried over, and some of it evolved. In the Second World War, a subaltern was "baggie-arsed", but was simply a "baggie" by the time of the Korean War. Similarly, the Second World War "mongaree" and "monga" for food, taken from Arabic as "mongy" was taken from the French "manger" in the First World War, and from which "hard monga" for iron rations and "soft monga" for ordinary food were derived, became "mongar", this time adopted from Italian. World War II "cock orange" for a commanding officer became a "cock oboe" in the Korean War.

The Korean War introduced further words to Digger slang, which were re-used in the Vietnam War. One such was "hutchie", the equivalent to World War I "dugout", taken from the Japanese word for a house. The Vietnam War introduced "noggies" for Vietnamese in general ("gooks" being the North Vietnamese in particular), "frag" (shared with U.S. military slang) for a foolhardy officer killed by his own men, "bush-bash" (a reference to four-wheel driving practices in the Australian Outback) for a jungle patrol, "mammasan" for a madam of a brothel, and "Saigon rose" (or "Vietnamese rose") for a particular sexually transmitted disease. Other Digger slang words coined during the peacetime after the Second World War and that were then used in the wars were "nasho" for a national serviceman.

== Modern Operations ==
Australia's involvement in numerous United Nations peacekeeping operations, regional stabilisation operations such as Bougainville and Solomon Islands, as well as East Timor, Iraq and Afghanistan, have created new opportunities for Diggers to work and interact closely with soldiers and civilians from other nations. In Iraq, a local man was known as a "smufti". Getting sick from eating local food was known as "intestinal jihad". The American combat rations allocated to Diggers on combat patrols, Meals Ready to Eat ("MRE") were known as "Meals Ready to Excrete". A Digger who did not patrol outside of the wire was a "Fobbit", derived from the NATO acronym FOB (Forward Operating Base). Rifles were known as "bang-sticks", "tools" or a "woody". A task which went wrong was known as a "cluster-fuck" and if no-one was to blame then it was due to the "Inshallah factor". The slang term for the Middle Eastern areas of operations was referred to as the "Sand pit".

A lazy Digger was known as a "jackman", "jack", or "oxygen-thief". "Jack" is most commonly used as an adjective for a person or behaviour that places the individual performing the action's interests ahead of those of the team. The term "Quoinker" is used to describe someone who would suck up, befriend or attempt to please persons of higher rank. This expression would also be used by mates of a soldier as they received an award, accolade or just general praise for a job well done. This is done by the soldiers mates to remind the praised soldier that they are not getting the award for hard work but for "Quoinking" "Dink Dink" refers to someone who wears eye glasses, "Dink Dink" is the sound the glasses make when they hit the ground after the wearer is knocked down / killed .

Due to the institutionalised nature of military weapons training in Australia, a number of metaphors associated with rifle ranges were applied to operations. Combat was known as the "two way rifle range", returning fire to the enemy was known as "putting a few rounds down range", and coordinating Diggers for a large, long, boring or mundane job was known to be as exciting as a "brass party at Gallipoli" (brass parties painstakingly collect all of the expended ammunition cartridges off the ground at the completion of a rifle range practice). The boredom or repetitive mundane aspects of operations were described by the term "living the dream" or the American term "Groundhog Day".An item of equipment that is either of high quality or particularly useful may be described as "gucci." These items are almost invariably not standard issue.

Some slang has retained significant longevity and while finding its origins in previous conflicts are nevertheless still used by Diggers today. For example, medals were known as "gongs" or "tin". Common sense was known as "CDF" or "common dog fuck" and the morning of the last day in theatre of operations or exercise was known as a "wakey". The small metal spoon found in the Australian Defence Force's 24-hour combat ration pack, called a Field Ration Eating Device, was abbreviated to "FRED" (said to stand for Fucking Ridiculous Eating Device).

Some Digger slang entered mainstream Australian English vocabulary. Some examples of this were "zap", "waste" or "turn into pink mist", all originally taken from U.S. military slang, meaning "to kill". Similar influence of Digger stereotyping on mainstream vocabulary has been the retention of "returned-servicemen" or "vets" for what in many other countries are called veterans. The latter name became more common in the 1980s with the creation of the Department of Veterans Affairs by the federal government, but "returned-servicemen" still remains in popular usage through the Returned Servicemen League clubs.

== See also ==
- List of military slang terms
- List of established military terms
- Glossary of military abbreviations
- List of government and military acronyms
