= Johann Haas von Haagenfels =

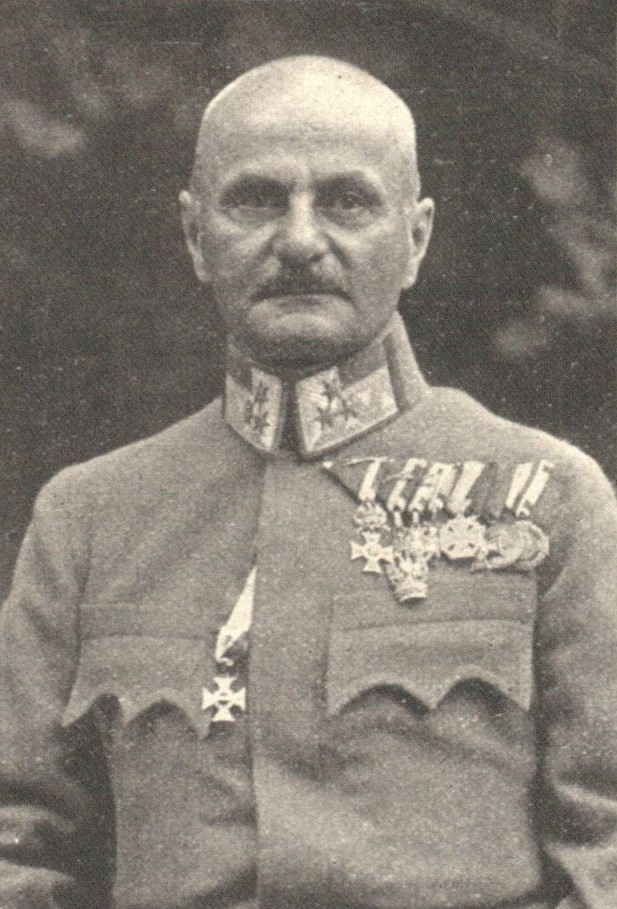
Johann Haas von Haagenfels (May 1918)

Johann Freiherr Haas von Haagenfels (March 24, 1864 in Haag, Austria – May 15, 1932 in Vienna) was an Austro-Hungarian Army Officer. His exploits during World War I earned him numerous decorations, including the prestigious Military Order of Maria Theresa, the highest Austro-Hungarian Military decoration. (184th Promotion on 17 August 1917).

== Career ==
In the beginning of World War I, Lieutenant Colonel (Oberstleutnant) Johann Haas von Haagenfels commanded Feldjägerbattalion 21. For heroic leadership, he was elevated to the hereditary Austrian nobility with the title "von Haagenfels" on 15 March 1916. Promoted to full colonel (Oberst) and commanding officer of Infantry Regiment 74, he was awarded the Order of Maria Theresia in 1917 and subsequently received a hereditary Austrian barony on 12 September 1918. He was, as of 15 October 1918, commanding officer of the 50 Infantry Brigade, part of Generalmajor Werz von Ostenkampf's 25th Infantry Division. On this day, Haas von Haagenfeld's 50th Brigade consisted of 4th Infantry Regiment, 5th Feldjäger Battalion, 6th Feldjäger Battalion and 10th Feldjäger Battalion. The Division was part of Field Marshal Svetozar Borevic's Army Group Boroević.

== After World War I ==
Baron von Haagenfels was one of the officers who immediately supported the new Austrian Republic. Promoted to brigadier general (Generalmajor), he was appointed commanding officer of the Volkswehr, the predecessor of the Austrian Federal Army in Vienna and Lower Austria.

== Decorations (selection) ==
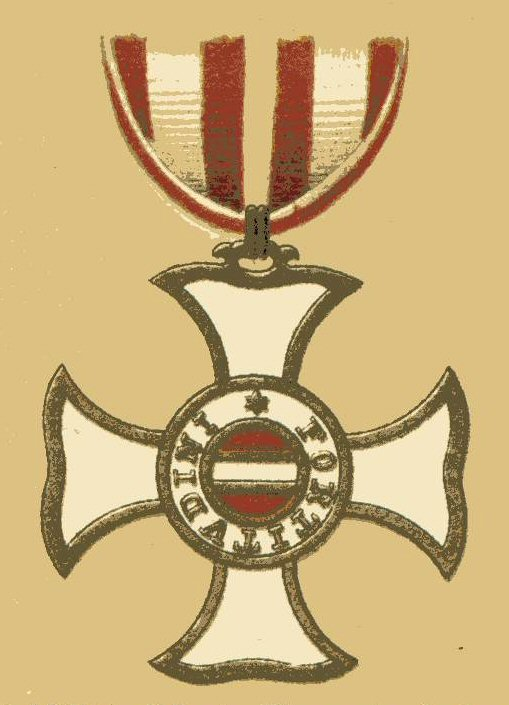
Military Order of Maria Theresa

- Knight's Cross of the Military Maria Theresia Order
- Military Merit Cross 2nd Class with War Decoration and Swords
- Order of Leopold (Knight)
- Order of the Iron Crown 3rd Class with War Decoration and Swords
- Honour Insignia 3rd Class of the Austrian Red Cross
- Military Merit Cross 3rd Class with War Decoration and Swords
- Military Merit Cross 3rd Class (peace time award)
- Bronze Military Merit Medal with War Decoration (Signum Laudis)
- Karl Troop Cross (German: Karl-Truppenkreuz)
- Service Badge for Officers 1st Class
- Military Jubilee Medal 1898
- Military Jubilee Cross 1908
- Prussian Iron Cross 2nd Class and 1st Class
- Ottoman Iron Crescent
