= Hüseyin Turgut =

Turkish major general (1900–1971)

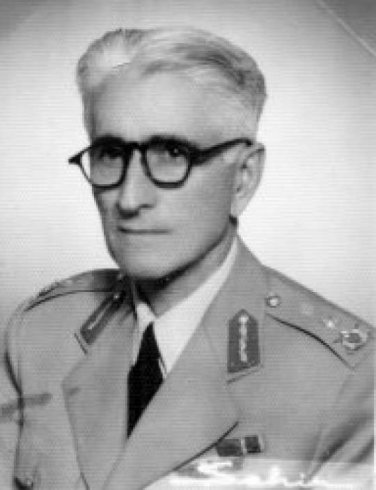
- Born: Huseyn Khan Hasan Khan ogli Erivansky; November 1900; Erivan, Russian Empire
- Died: November 1971 (aged 70–71); Ankara, Turkey
- Burial place: Cebeci Military Cemetery
- Spouse: Leman Hattusas
- Children: Turhan Turgut, Nur Turgut
- Military career
- Allegiance: Ottoman Empire (1918–1920); Turkey (1920–1960)
- Branch: Turkish Land Forces; Turkish Air Force
- Service years: 1918–1960
- Rank: Tümgeneral
- Conflicts: First World War; Turkish Independence War

Hüseyin Turgut (1900–1971) was a major general in the Turkish Armed Forces.

He participated in World War I and the Turkish War of Independence. He served for 30 years in the Turkish Air Force.

== Early years ==
Hüseyin Turgut was born in November 1900 in the city of Erivan (now Yerevan, Armenia). He received his secondary education at the gymnasium in Erivan.

After the October Revolution of 1917 and the arbitrary actions of Armenians in Erivan, he and his family moved to Nakhchivan. After participating in the defense of Nakhchivan for a while, he parted ways with his family and went to Turkey.

== In Turkey ==
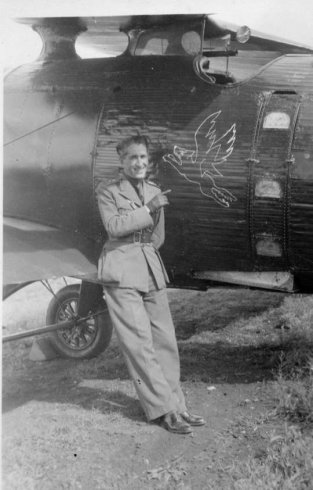
Hüseyin Turgut in Turkish Air Force

Hüseyin Turgut joined the Ottoman army in 1918 and took part in World War I as a member of the 5th battalion of the 4th corps, and later in the battles of the 11th battalion in Doğubayazıt. He was awarded the "Iron Crescent" medal for his outstanding service in the last months of the war in the eastern and southeastern fronts.

After the Turkish War of Independence began, he participated in the operations to liberate Kars, Sarikamis, and Gumru with the rank of lieutenant on the eastern front. He was awarded the "Independence" medal by Atatürk. After the war ended, he remained in the army and took part in suppressing the Kurdish uprisings in the south-east of Turkey.

Until 1930, Hüseyin Turgut served in the Ankara Guard Regiment, and due to his distinguished service, he was appointed to the Turkish Air Force. In 1932, he was sent to France to follow innovations and participate in training as he was one of the five successful pilots in the competition among pilots. He returned after achieving high results in the training in France. Hüseyin Turgut, who spoke six languages, participated in training new pilots for the Turkish Air Force from 1934 to 1946. He was known in the Turkish Air Force as "Uncle Junge."

He suffered a severe accident in 1946. After the accident, he could no longer undergo training and worked in various other positions in the Turkish Air Force. He retired with the rank of major general in 1960 after 42 years of service.

Hüseyin Turgut died in November 1971 in Ankara and was buried in a special military ceremony at the Cebeci Military Cemetery in Ankara.

== Family ==
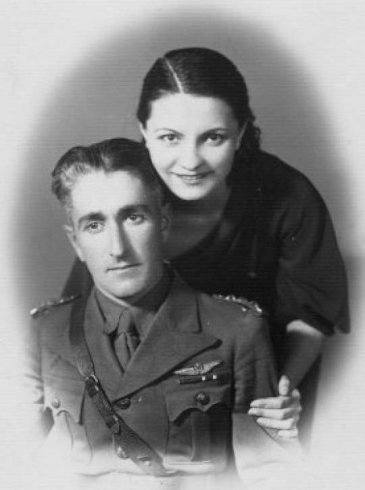
Hüseyin Turgut with his spouse Leman Hatussas

Hüseyin Turgut's father, Hasan Khan Erivansky (in Turkey Turgut), was the son of khans of Erivan and his mother was Shahzada Nuraleyn Khanum Qovanli-Qajar, the daughter of Bakhman Mirza Qovanli-Qajar. He had two brothers named Ferid and Sami, two sisters named Ruhsare and Adile.

In 1936, Hüseyin Turgut married Leman Hattusas and they had a daughter named Nur in 1940 and a son named Turhan in 1946.

== Rewards ==
- — In 1918, he was awarded the "Gallipoli Star" medal for his services in the Eastern and Southeastern Fronts of the First World War.
- — In 1923, he was awarded the "Independence" medal for his services in the Turkish War of Independence.
