= Combat Ration One Person =

Field ration

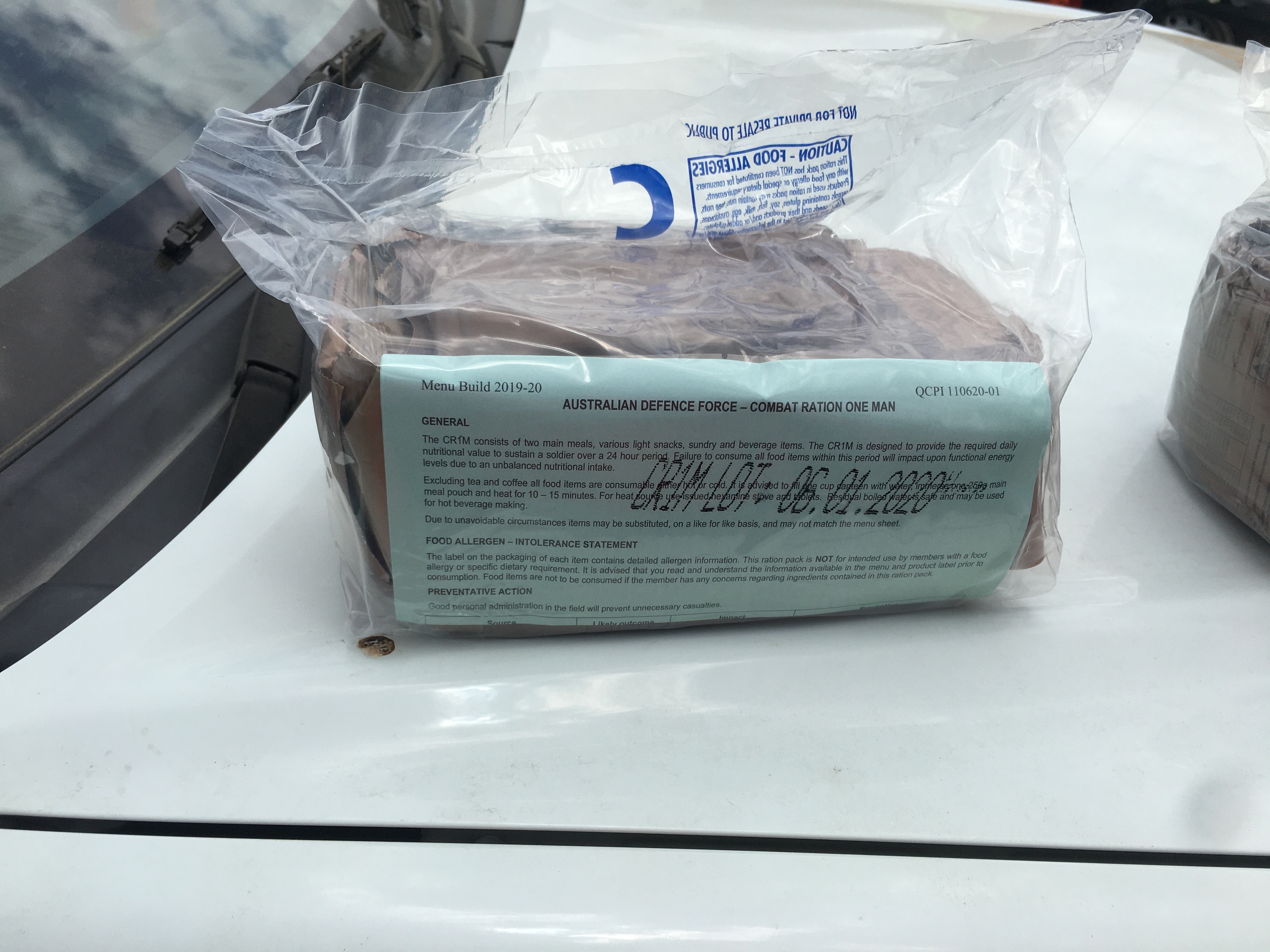
A packaged Combat Ration One Person

The Combat Ration One Person (CR1P), formerly known as the Combat Ration One Man (CR1M) is a self-contained individual field ration in lightweight packaging procured by the Australian Defence Force for use in combat or other field conditions where organised food facilities are unavailable.

Unit cost is approximately $50 AUD.

== Contents ==
The CR1P consists of two vacuum-packed main courses, a midday snack, a number of sundry items (toilet paper, can opener, matches, scouring pad, etc.) and a field ration eating device (FRED).

The contents of the CR1P are produced by various companies within Australia and New Zealand with most of the food and condiments being items commonly found in Australian stores, such as Nestlé's Australian Defence Force Chocolate Ration, Uncle Tobys' Muesli Bars, and Bega Vegemite.

== Variants ==
Two other close variants of the Combat Ration One Person (CR1P) are the PR1P (Patrol Ration One Person) and the CR5P (Combat Ration 5 Person).

The PR1P is a lightweight variant of the CR1P weighing only 60% of the total weight of the CR1P, the main items in it are freeze dried and vacuum sealed to reduce size and weight. It is made to sustain a soldier for 24 hours in combat but can last up to 3 days in a survival situation.

The CR5P is the five-person variant of the CR1P, it is packed in a large box and contains enough food sources to last five troops 24 hours in a combat situation. Unlike the other Australian ration packs this one is not size conscious and is often split up into the packs of troops as it is a means of group feeding.

== See also ==
- List of military rations
- Military nutrition
- Ninja diet
