= Mustafa Mümin Aksoy =

Ottoman spy military officer and intelligence officer

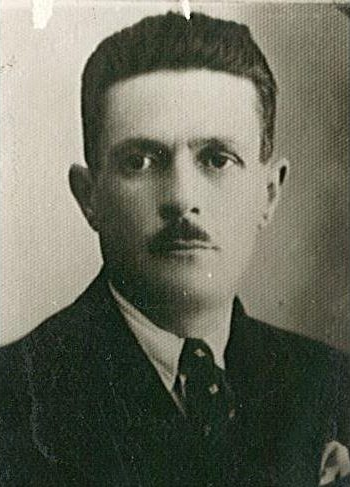

Miralay
- Parliamentary group: 24 Ocak 1948

Personal details
- Born: 1892 İzmir, Ottoman Empire
- Died: January 24, 1948 (aged 55–56) İzmir, Turkey
- Education: Deniz Harp Okulu
- Profession: Kuvayi Milliye; Turkish Armed Forces
- Awards: Mecidiye Nişanı; Harp Madalyası
- Nickname: Gavûr Mümin

Military service
- Allegiance: Kuvayi Milliye; Turkish Armed Forces
- Years of service: 1911–1948
- Rank: Miralay
- Battles/wars: Balkan Wars; World War I Turkish War of Independence

Mustafa Mümin Aksoy Paşa, also known as Gavûr Mümin, (b. 1892, İzmir, d. 24 January 1948, İzmir) was a member of the Kuva-yi Milliye, the irregular Turkish nationalist forces that fought in the Turkish War of Independence. He was also part of the Turkish Armed Forces. Aksoy was the son of Osmanzade İbrahim Bey', a nephew of Izmir's mayor Hacı Hasan Bey.

== Military career ==
In 1911, he graduated from the Beylerbeyi Reserve Officer School (Beylerbeyi Yedek Subay Okulu) as a lieutenant, after he served in the First Balkan War. He was stationed in Edirne and Çatalca. He later served in the Gallipoli Campaign, called Çanakkale Savaşı in Turkish, and along the eastern front of the Turkish War of Independence. Prior to the Occupation of Izmir, Aksoy served as commander of the Izmir Gendermarie Regiment until 1920. During Greece's occupation of Turkey, he was part of the Turkish intelligence organization that formed in the Izmir region. While Mümin was director of the intelligence services, his uncle Hacı Hasan Paşa worked with the Greek administration. Mümin continued his duties in Izmir with the aid of his uncle and presented himself as a Turkish officer working on behalf of the Greek administration. He gained the trust of the Greek commander Zafirios. He was given the nicknames Gavûr Kirye and Hain Mümin by the Turkish population of Izmir, who did not know the truth of his activities. Mümin passed intelligence reports from the Greek occupation headquarters to the Ankara government.

Mümin Paşa's activities were discovered by the Greek force and he was arrested before the Great Offensive and taken to the Palamadi prison. After the Armistice of Mudanya he was sent to Palya İstratona prison, and eventually he was moved to the Lusiya Esir Camp. He was released after the Turkish War of Independence as part of the prisoner exchange agreements between Turkey and Greece. He returned to Turkey on April 5, 1923.

== Death ==
He took the name "Aksoy" after the Surname law was enacted. Mustafa Mümin Aksoy Paşa. He was engaged to Muhsine but died of tuberculosis en route to Hakkâri Province on 25 January 1948.
