= Field ration eating device =

Australian military eating utensil

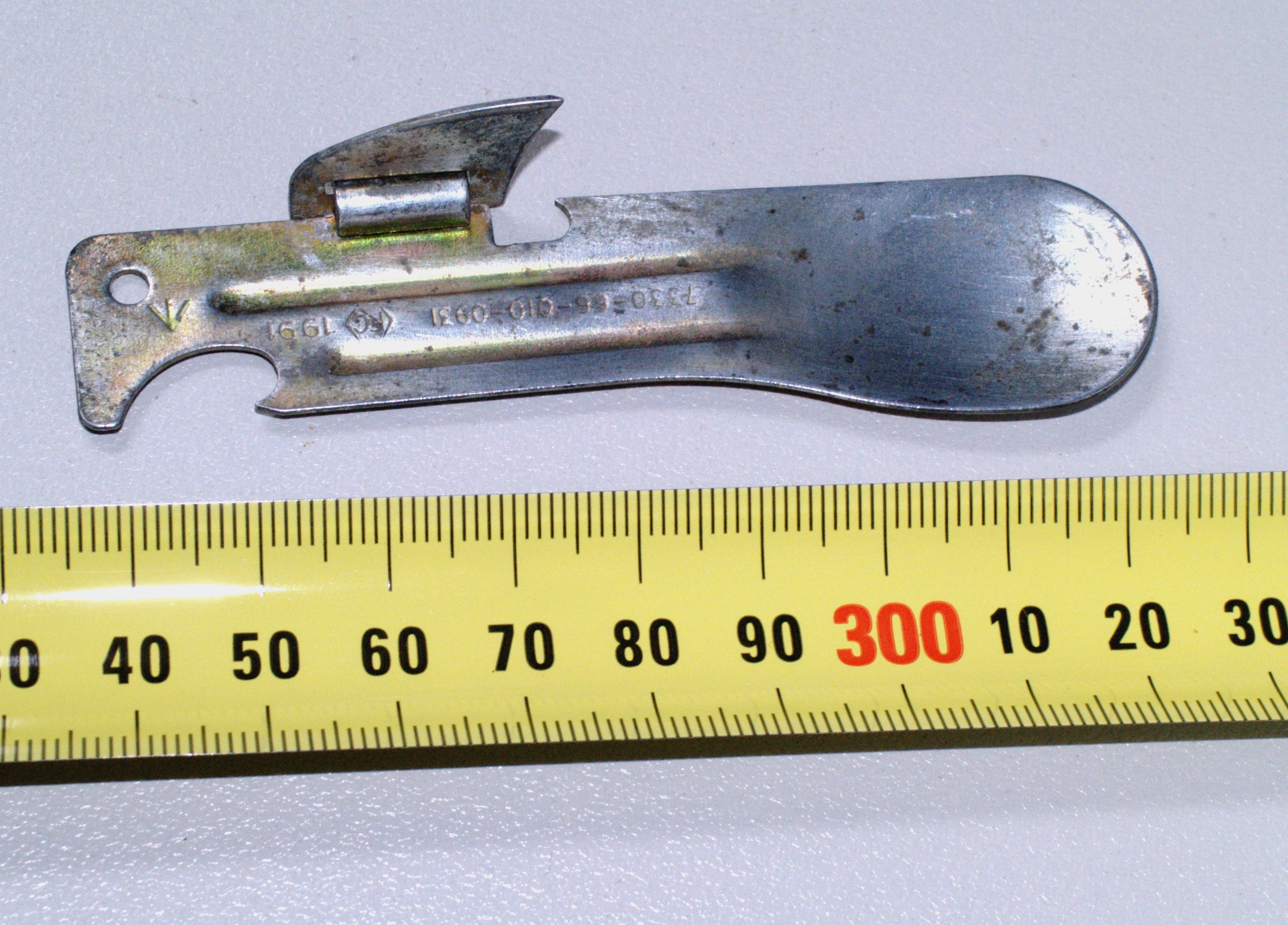
A field ration eating device with a tape measure displaying its length

The field ration eating device (FRED) is an Australian eating utensil and multi-tool that serves as a combination of a can opener, bottle opener, and spoon. It was first issued around 1943 to the Australian Defence Force for use with its Combat Ration One Man field rations. Initially just a can opener, more functions were added, and it could be sterilised. The FRED was to be discontinued in about 2005, with ring-pull cans, boil-in-a-bag meals, and a spoon, meant to make the utensil redundant. As of 2016, it is still included in ration packs.

Its NATO Stock Number (NSN) is 7330-66-010-0931 and the item name is "opener, hand, can". It is also humorously referred to as the "fucking ridiculous eating device".

== See also ==
- P-38 can opener
- Combination eating utensils
