= Australianism =

Australianism may refer to:

- Australian English words or phrases
- Culture of Australia
