= List of Eureka Stockade defenders =

1854 armed uprising in the Eureka Rebellion

This is an incomplete list of those who were among the rebel garrison at the Battle of the Eureka Stockade that took place on 3 December 1854 at Ballarat, Victoria, Australia. It was the culmination of the 1851–1854 Eureka Rebellion during the Victorian gold rush. The fighting resulted in at least 27 deaths and many injuries, the majority of casualties being rebels. The miners had various grievances, chiefly the cost of mining permits and the officious way the system was enforced. There was an armed uprising in Ballarat where tensions were brought to a head following the death of miner James Scobie. On 30 November 1854, the Eureka Flag was raised during a paramilitary display on Bakery Hill that resulted in the formation of rebel companies and the construction of a crude battlement on the Eureka lead.

== Fortification of the Eureka lead ==
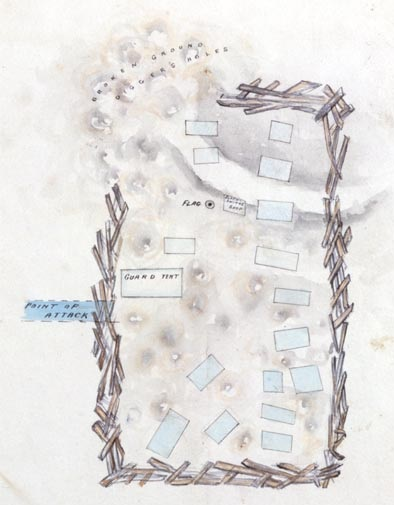
A plan of the Eureka Stockade in the 1855 Victorian High Treason trials

Following the oath swearing and Eureka Flag raising ceremony on Bakery Hill, about 1,000 rebels marched in double file to the Eureka lead, where the Eureka Stockade was constructed over the next few days. It consisted of pit props held together as spikes by rope and overturned horse carts. Raffaello Carboni described it in his 1855 memoirs as being "higgledy piggledy". It encompassed an area said to be one acre; however, that is difficult to reconcile with other estimates that have the dimensions of the stockade as being around 100 feet (30 m) x 200 feet (61 m). Contemporaneous representations vary and render the stockade as either rectangular or semi-circular. Testimony was heard at the high treason trials for the Eureka rebels that the stockade was four to seven feet high in places and was unable to be negotiated on horseback without being reduced. (Note: Peter Lalor himself said the wooden structure was never meant to be a fortress, saying "it was nothing more than an enclosure to keep our own men together, and was never erected with an eye to military defence". However Peter FitzSimons says that Lalor may have downplayed the fact that the Eureka Stockade may have been intended as something of a fortress, at a time when "it was very much in his interests" to do so.)

Lieutenant governor Charles Hotham feared that the goldfield's terrain would greatly favour the rebel snipers. Ballarat gold commissioner Robert Rede would instead order an early morning surprise attack on the rebel camp. Carboni details the rebel dispositions along:

The shepherds' holes inside the lower part of the stockade had been turned into rifle-pits, and were now occupied by Californians of the I.C. Rangers' Brigade, some twenty or thirty in all, who had kept watch at the 'outposts' during the night.

The location of the stockade has been described by Eureka veteran John Lynch as "appalling from a defensive point of view" as it was situated on "a gentle slope, which exposed a sizeable portion of its interior to fire from nearby high ground". (Note: A detachment of 800 men, which included "two field pieces and two howitzers" under the commander in chief of the British forces in Australia, Major General Sir Robert Nickle, who had seen action during the 1798 Irish rebellion, arrived after the insurgency had been put down. In 1860, Withers stated in a lecture that "The site was most injudicious for any purpose of defence as it was easily commanded from adjacent spots, and the ease with which the place could be taken was apparent to the most unprofessional eye".)

In the early hours of 1 December 1854, the rebels were observed to be massing on Bakery Hill, but a government raiding party found the area vacated. The riot act was read to a mob that had gathered around Bath's Hotel, with mounted police breaking up the unlawful assembly. A three-man miner's delegation met with Rede to present a peace proposal; however, Rede was suspicious of the chartist undercurrent of the anti-mining tax movement and rejected the proposals as being the way forward.

The rebels sent out scouts and established picket lines in order to have advance warning of Rede's movements and a request for reinforcements to the other mining settlements. The "moral force" faction had withdrawn from the protest movement as the men of violence moved into the ascendancy. The rebels continued to fortify their position as 300-400 men arrived from Creswick Creek, and Carboni recalls they were: "dirty and ragged, and proved the greatest nuisance. One of them, Michael Tuohy, behaved valiantly". Once foraging parties were organised, there was a rebel garrison of around 200 men. Amid the Saturday night revelry, low munitions, and major desertions, Lalor ordered that any man attempting to leave the stockade be shot.

== Eureka Stockade defenders ==
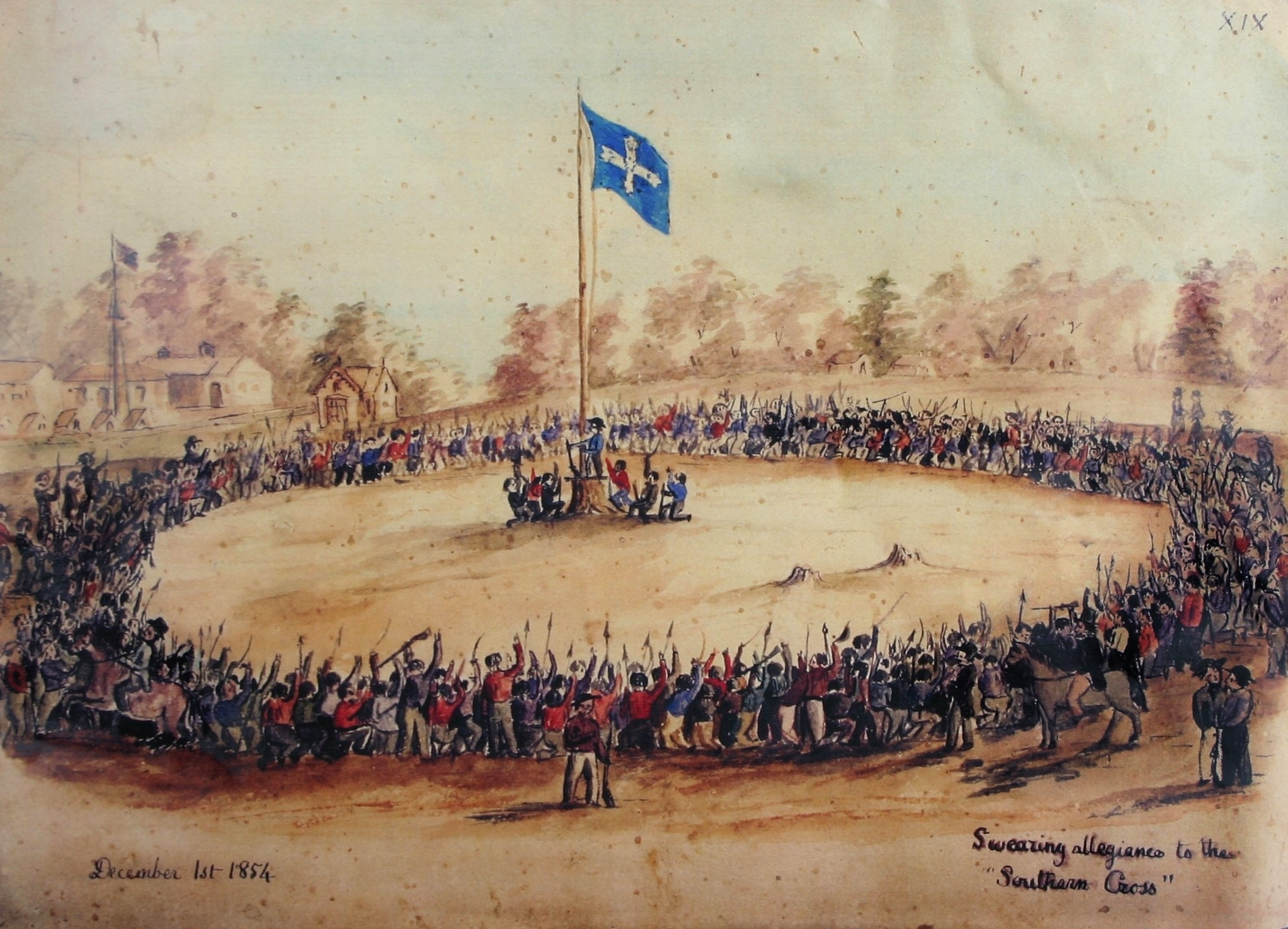
Swearing Allegiance to the Southern Cross by Charles Doudiet (1854)

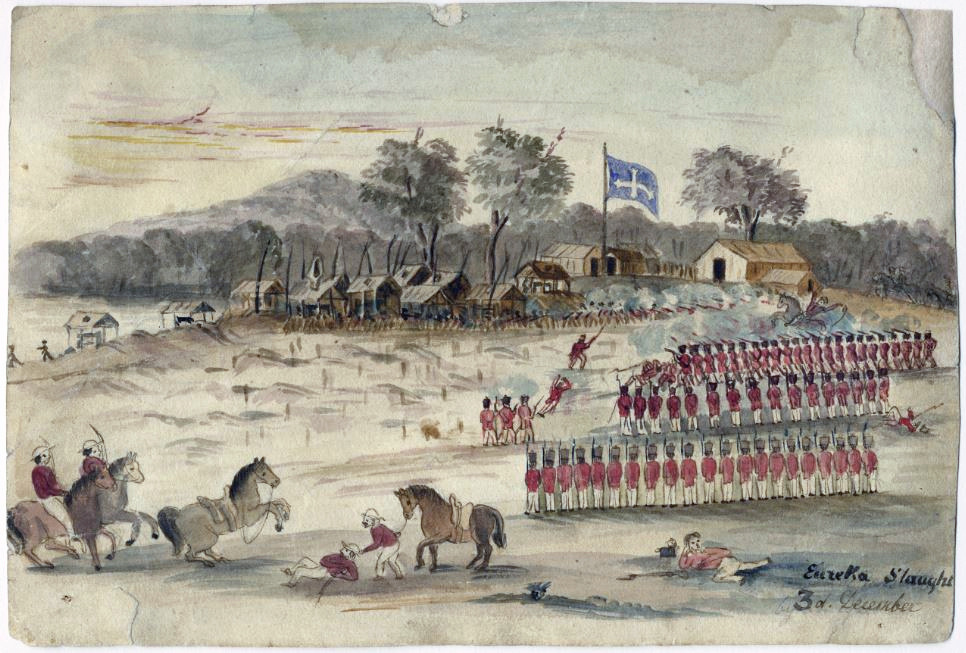
Eureka Slaughter by Charles Doudiet (1854)

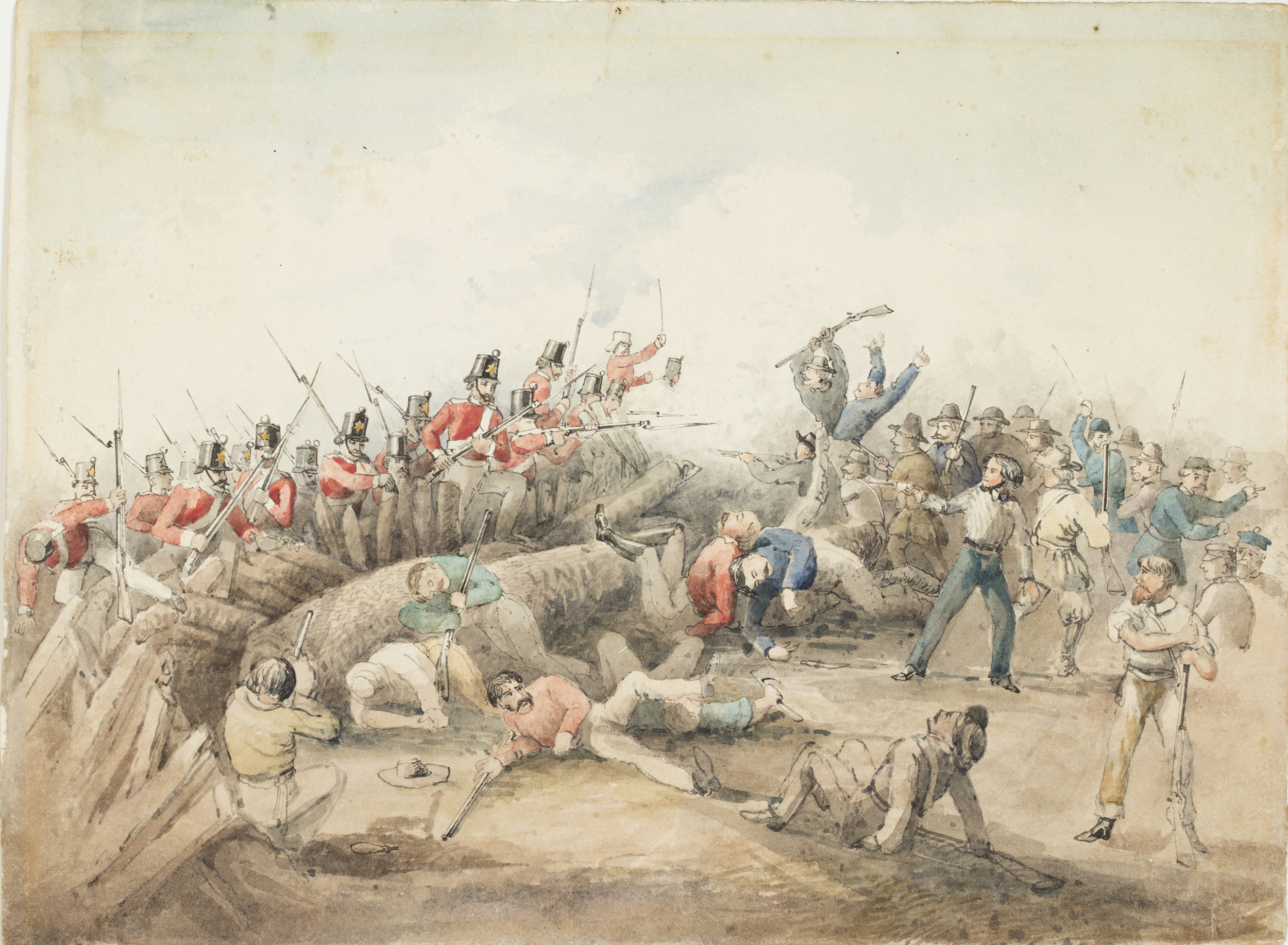
Eureka Stockade Riot by J.B. Henderson (1854)

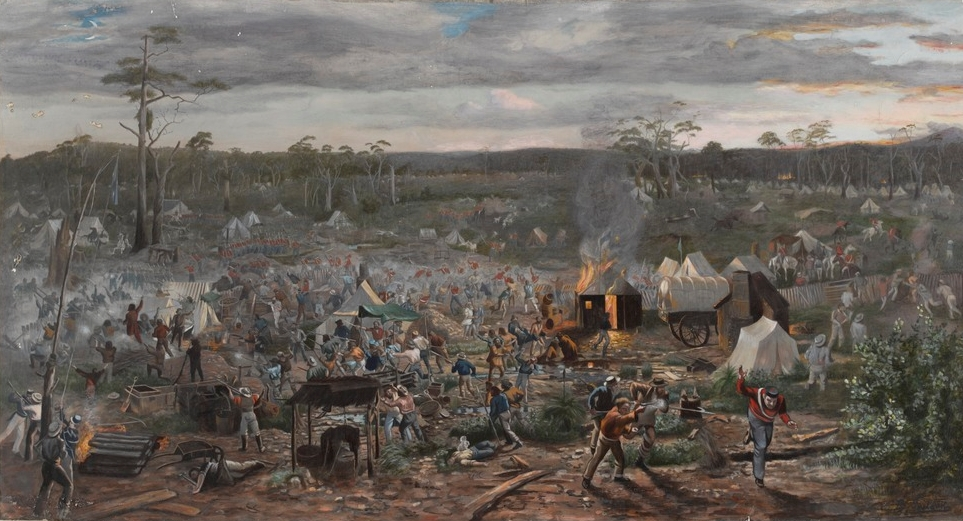
Eureka Stockade by Beryl Ireland (c.1890-1900)

Common estimates for the size of the Eureka Stockade garrison at the time of the attack on 3 December range from 120 to 150 men. A number of people who played an important part in the Eureka Rebellion and were defending the Eureka Stockade at some point lived in tents situated outside the stockade and were on assignment or otherwise absent when the surprise attack took place on Sunday morning, 3 December 1854. Among them were some of the rebel commanders and others such as Patrick O'Day, who had previously served in the British army and was involved in training the Eureka Stockade pikemen.

According to rebel commander in chief Peter Lalor's reckoning: "There were about 70 men possessing guns, 30 with pikes and 30 with pistols, but many had no more than one or two rounds of ammunition. Their coolness and bravery were admirable when it is considered that the odds were 3 to 1 against". Lalor's command was riddled with informants, and Rede was kept well advised of his movements, particularly through the work of government agents Henry Goodenough and Andrew Peters, who were embedded in the rebel garrison.

Initially outnumbering the government camp considerably, Lalor had already devised a strategy where "if the government forces come to attack us, we should meet them on the Gravel Pits, and if compelled, we should retreat by the heights to the old Canadian Gully, and there we shall make our final stand". On being brought to battle that day, Lalor stated: "we would have retreated, but it was then too late".

Rede planned to send the combined military police formation of 276 men under the command of Captain John Thomas to attack the Eureka Stockade when the rebel garrison was observed to be at a low watermark. The police and military had the element of surprise timing their assault on the stockade for dawn on Sunday, the Christian Sabbath day of rest. The soldiers and police marched off in silence at around 3:30 am Sunday morning after the troopers had drunk the traditional tot of rum. The British commander used bugle calls to coordinate his forces. The 40th regiment was to provide covering fire from one end, with mounted police covering the flanks. Enemy contact began at approximately 150 yards as the two columns of regular infantry and the contingent of foot police moved into position.

According to military historian Gregory Blake, the fighting in Ballarat on 3 December 1854 was not one-sided and full of indiscriminate murder by the colonial forces. In his memoirs, John Lynch, one of Lalor's captains, mentions "some sharp shooting". For at least 10 minutes, the rebels offered stiff resistance, with ranged fire coming from the Eureka Stockade garrison such that Thomas's best formation, the 40th regiment, wavered and had to be rallied. Blake says this is "stark evidence of the effectiveness of the defender's fire".

The rebels eventually ran short of ammunition, and the government forces resumed their advance. The Victorian police contingent led the way over the top as the forlorn hope in a bayonet charge. Carboni says it was the pikemen who stood their ground that suffered the heaviest casualties, with Lalor ordering the musketeers to take refuge in the mine holes and crying out, "Pikemen, advance! Now for God's sake do your duty". There were twenty to thirty Californians at the stockade during the battle. After the rebel garrison had already begun to flee and all hope was lost, a number of them gamely joined in the final melee bearing their trademark Colt revolvers.

The exact numbers of deaths and injuries cannot be determined as, according to researcher Dorothy Wickham, many miners "fled to the surrounding bush, and it is likely a good many more died a lonely death or suffered the agony of their wounds, hidden from the authorities for fear of repercussions". On 20 June 1855, the registrar of Ballarat, William Thomas Pooley, entered 27 consecutive names into the Victorian death register. There are a least three dead buried outside of Ballarat. In total, it has been discovered that there are at least ten other individuals not found on the register but referred to elsewhere as having died.

Here is a list of the best-documented rebels who participated in the defence of the Eureka Stockade.

Name	Birth year	Birthplace	Status	Legacy and notes	Ref(s)
? Ackeroyd	unknown	unknown	survivor	Ackeroyd was at the Eureka Stockade and attended the 50th-anniversary commemorations. He was pictured in the Leader, 10 December 1904 edition.	
Thomas Alexander	1823	unknown	survivor	Is probably the same Thomas Alexander who signed the Bendigo Petition	
James Ashburner	1827	Liverpool, England	survivor	Ashburner was a pikeman at the Eureka Stockade who was captured during the fall of the Stockade. He was reported for wielding a pike made from a pick. Ashburner witnessed Peter Lalor being shot, and fearing for the rebel leader's life, he dragged Lalor outside the stockade, where he took refuge in a hole. He was detained soon after and chained to Timothy Hayes overnight. Ashburner was in Ballarat for the 50th anniversary commemorations. His account was published in the Ballarat Courier, 3 December 1904 edition.	
William Edward Atherden	1838	Kent, England	survivor	Last remaining survivor of the Eureka Stockade	
Robert Batty	1838	Gainsborough, England	survivor	Attended the 50th-anniversary reunion in Ballarat	
James Beattie	1823	Cumberland, England	survivor	Beattie was one of the indicted rebels tried and acquitted in the 1855 Victorian High Treason trials. Witnesses stated that he volunteered to join a rebel company at the 29 December 1854 meeting at Bakery Hill. He then drilled and marched with the other rebels to the Eureka lead and was drilled again that and the following day. Beattie negotiated the perimeter of the stockade just before the shooting had ceased. Beattie had a large horse pistol that he dropped within the stockade when he saw troops outside. He either fell or drooped to his knees and cried for mercy, saying he "was beaten and would give in".	
James Beveridge	1832	Sterling, Scotland	survivor	Was accompanying William Simpson Hardie when he was shot by a stray bullet from a government camp sentry	
Edmund Bloehm	unknown	Germany	survivor	Was responsible for rousing many members of the rebel garrison at the start of the battle	
William Braidie	unknown	unknown	survivor	Bradie was featured in a portrait of Eureka Stockade veterans that was taken during the 50th-anniversary commemorations in 1904	
Edmund Bloehm	unknown	Germany	survivor	Bloehm was responsible for rousing many members of the rebel garrison at the start of the battle	
James Brazel	unknown	unknown	survivor	The Weekly Times, 19 November 1910 edition, mentions that Brazel was a merchandise peddlar on the goldfields and that he was an associate of Lalor. He fled from Ballarat after the battle and did not return until after the amnesty for all on the runs was announced.	
James Brown	1825	Newry, Ireland	died of wounds	Wounded in the battle and died sometime in February 1855. May have been the same James Brown who signed a petition for compensation brought by Benden S Hassell. During the James Scobie inquest he complained that Mr Johnstone would not take evidence from some miners. Buried in the Old Ballarat Cemetery.	
Alfred Bryant	unknown	unknown	killed in action	Known to have been badly wounded in the battle, Police Inspector Henry Foster informed his relatives that his whereabouts was unknown, and that unidentified Eureka rebels had been buried	
Robert Burnete	unknown	unknown	survivor	Was one of Peter Lalor's rebel captains in command of the "Independent Californian Rangers Revolver Brigade". He later claimed to have fired the first shot of the battle by either side, which killed Captain Wise. Carried a rifle.	
Thomas Burns	unknown	unknown	survivor	Burns was at the Eureka Stockade, and it was later said that he helped to prevent the arrest of Peter Lalor at Meredith	
James Byrne	unknown	unknown	wounded	Was said to have been wounded in the battle.	
Patrick Callinan	c.1832	Kilfenora County Clare, Ireland	wounded	Suffered a wound between his shoulders and a cut under his left breast, both from a bayonet. His name is recorded in Lalor's official list of casualties.	
Thomas Callinan	1836	Kilfenora County Clare, Ireland	wounded	Wounded in the battle and listed as "since recovered" in Lalor's list	
Donald Cameron	1829	Fassa Farn, lnvernisshire, Scotland	wounded	His obituary in the Wagga Wagga Express, 13 June 1914 edition, mentions he was present at the battle	
James Macfie Campbell	unknown	Kingston, Jamaica	survivor	Campbell was one of the indicted rebels tried and acquitted of high treason.	
Michael Canny	1832	County Clare, Ireland	survivor	In 1904, he gave some recollections saying that during the battle, he remembered seeing Peter Lalor began to stagger, then drop his weapon before stooping quickly to pick it up with his other hand, not knowing until later that the rebel leader had been wounded	
Patrick Canny	1836	County Clare, Ireland	survivor	Brother of Michael Canny. According to the Argus, the Canny brothers supplied 2,000 wooden slabs along with laths that were used in the construction of the Eureka Stockade.	
Frank Carey	unknown	Boston, USA	survivor	It is said that Carey was at the Eureka Stockade. He owned the Excelsior restaurant in Ballarat. It was widely rumoured that he was framed for sly grog selling by Sergeant Major Robert Milne for not paying police bribes. In September 1854, Carey was sentenced to six months imprisonment and was given a conditional pardon after one month to placate the US consul.	
George Clifton	1822/25	County Clare, Ireland	died of wounds	Badly wounded in the battle and died on 14 January 1855. Possibly known as "Happy Jack". Buried at Old Ballarat Cemetery.	
Thomas Commins	unknown	unknown	survivor	His obituary in the Australian Town and Country, 3 November 1888 edition, mentions that he was at the battle and that he was a devout Peter Lalor supporter and was among a number of people who first introduced Duncan Gillies, premier of Victoria (1886-1890) to the miners of Ballarat.	
John Joseph Corran	unknown	Isle of Man	survivor	Was present at the battle. He returned for the 50th anniversary of the Eureka Stockade in 1904. His commemorative blue ribbon as given to all the rebel veterans, is now held by the Gold Museum in Ballarat.	
Frederick London Coxhead	c.1831/1832	London, England	died of wounds	Was a lawyer's clerk who was at the Eureka Stockade. Died of wounds at Ballarat Benevolent Asylum eighteen months later, in May 1856. According to the Melbourne Herald, 12 May 1856 edition, he received a gunshot wound that resulted in compression of the brain and a fatal abscess.	
Alfred Crowe	1823	Scotland	died of wounds	Was present at the battle and died from injuries sustained. A chartist who supported John Hummfray. He told others that he had seen two Italian non-combatants being killed by government troops. The diary he kept is mentioned in From Tent to Parliament: The Life of Peter Lalor and His Coadjutors and was used as a source by the authors.	
John Crowe	1824	Paulstown, Kilkenny, Ireland	killed in action	Was present at the battle and died from injuries sustained after being treated by Dr James Stewart. He was then buried in Ballarat Old Cemetery late on 3 December 1854.	
Robert Dawson	unknown	unknown	survivor	His obituary in The Herald, 17 January 1921 edition, notes that he was present at the battle and his sense of pride at having supported the rebel cause.	
Martin Diamond	c.1831	Castle Clare, Ireland	survivor	His goldfields store was engulfed by the Eureka Stockade, later described as "half in and half out of it" by his wife Anne. Carboni records that meetings of the rebel leadership took place in Diamond's store. It was burnt down on the day of the battle, with Diamond being shot and cut with a sword three times and bayonetted in front of Anne. Lalor incorrectly refers to him as "John Diamond" in his list.	
Thomas Dignum	1836	Sydney, NSW	survivor	Dignum is among the four known native-born Australians at the Eureka Stockade and was one of the pikemen. Signed the Benden Hassell compensation petition. Carboni described him as a "serious looking, short, tight-built young chap" who "fought like a tiger" in the battle. He was one of the thirteen indicted rebels and succeeded in having the charge case dropped.	
George Donaghy	1829	Muff County, Donegal, Ireland	killed in action	He was buried in the Ballarat Old Cemetery on 3 December 1854.	
Dennis Dynan	unknown	County Clare, Ireland	killed in action	Wounded in the battle and listed as "since recovered" in Lalor's list	
William Emmermann	unknown	Saint Petersberg, Russia	died of wounds	Was probably the youngest of the rebel dead. He may have been the owner of the "Pikeman's Dog", a terrier that would not leave his dead owner after the battle.	
William Farley	unknown	unknown	survivor	Signed the Bendigo Petition in 1853. He later returned to Ballarat, where he was described as a Eureka Stockade veteran in the Weekly Times, 14 April 1917 edition.	
James Farrant	unknown	unknown	killed in action	In the Adelaide News, 9 February 1927 edition, there is a report concerning James William Farrant's 80th birthday that mentions his father died at the Eureka Stockade	
Robert? Fenton	unknown	unknown	died of wounds	There is a "Fenton" listed as "wounded and since dead" in Lalor's report. His name is included on the Digger's memorial in the Ballarat Old Cemetery	
Charles Derius Ferguson	1832	Farmington, Ohio, USA	survivor	Ferguson was with the Californian Rangers at the Eureka Stockade. Was one of three Americans taken prisoner and was released after representations from the US consul James Tarleton. Decided to stay in Australia and had a reputation for being one of the best horse breakers in the colony. In 1860, the outback explorer Robert O'Hara Burke asked Ferguson to be the foreman on his ill-fated expedition. He accepted but quit after Burke insisted on a pay reduction. Burke fired Ferguson who later sued the expedition committee and was awarded 183/6/8 pounds in compensation.	
William Flower	unknown	unknown	killed in action	Was said to have been killed at the Eureka Stockade	
Edward Flynn	unknown	unknown	killed in action	Was killed by soldiers whilst fleeing the stockade during the battle.	
Patrick Gittings	1822	Kilkenny, Ireland	died of wounds	Was mortally wounded and died the same day, possibly whilst being transported in a cart to Geelong	
Samuel Green	unknown	England	killed in action	Carboni recalled that he was a fine man, very tall and that he was the owner of the Pikeman's Dog	
John Hafele	unknown	Wurtemberg, Germany	killed in action	It is said that he was a blacksmith and that during the battle, the top of his skull was severed by Lieutenant Richard's sabre. Hafele Drive in Ballarat Old Cemetery is named after him. His name is mentioned only in Lalor's list.	
Walter Hall	unknown	Kington, Herefordshire, England	survivor	His obituary that appeared in the Daily Telegraph, 24 May 1912 edition, mentions that he was a Eureka Stockade veteran.	
W.R. Hall	unknown	unknown	survivor	He was with the Californian contingent and witnessed Captain Henry Wise being shot.	
Patrick Hanafin	unknown	County Kerry, Ireland	survivor	Wounded in the battle and listed as "since recovered" in Lalor's list	
Michael Hanley	c.1840	County Tipperary, Ireland	wounded	Wounded in the battle and listed as "since recovered" in Lalor's list. Family tradition has it that his two brothers were also at the Eureka Stockade. In early 1855, he signed the Benden Sherritt Hassell compensation petition. In his obituary in the Bathurst Times, 30 March 1914 edition, readers were told that he was just 14 at the time and was armed with a pike and a revolver. His brothers Jeremiah and Simon escaped unharmed, but he was shot in the arm, which he later lost the use of. It may have contributed to his death when he was thrown by a horse.	
Happy Jack	unknown	c.1823	died of wounds	Was shot in the abdomen during the battle and died on 14 January 1855. His death certificate bears the name George Clifton. Buried in Ballarat Old Cemetery.	|
George Hartley	1829	Philadelphia, Pennsylvania	wounded	Slightly wounded in the arm during battle. He was in attendance at the 50th-anniversary commemorations in Ballarat, where he received the title of "The Stockade Poet".	
James Heffernan	c.1828	unknown	survivor	His obituary in the Argus, 29 April 1909 edition, notes that he was at the Eureka Stockade. It is said that during the battle he helped to carry the wounded Peter Lalor to a place of safety.	
Thomas Henfield	c.1826	Wurtemberg, Germany.	died of wounds	Was wounded in the battle and died on 5 September 1854. Buried in the Diggers' Grave at Ballarat Old Cemetery.	
James Hodges	c.1829/1831	unknown	died of wounds	Was wounded twice in the battle in the leg and head. Also known as "Eureka Jim". In the Sydney Sun, 31 July 1915 edition, it was stated that the Eureka Flag "was hoisted at the Eureka Stockade in 1854 by Mr, James Hodges".	
Charles Howes	1835	Richmond, Van Diemen's Land	survivor	According to his obituary, he "took part in the historic Eureka riot".	
James Hull	unknown	unknown	wounded	It is said that he was in charge of the riflemen during the battle and was wounded in the thigh, which was later bandaged by Raffaello Carboni.	
John Hynes	1831	Corofin, County Clare, Ireland	killed in action?	There is some confusion as to whether he died immediately after being shot by soldiers or on 6 December, according to family records. Although his name appears on the Digger's Monument in Ballarat, it appears he may have been buried in an unmarked grave in Geelong Eastern Cemetery on 3 December. His name was incorrectly spelt "Haynes" on the Eureka Monument.	
John Joseph	1831	New York, USA	survivor	Joseph was one of the rebels indicted and acquitted of high treason. He was praised for his performance under fire. Carboni said that Joseph was honest and kind and fired as part of the volley that killed Captain Wise. As an African American, doctor Charles Kenworthy did not act as Joseph's intermediary in an effort to secure his release as he did in relation to other Americans in legal jeopardy as a result of their involvement in the Eureka Rebellion. Joseph was tried first and acquitted. It is said that he was carried aloft in a chair by a joyous crowd around the streets of Melbourne.	
Robert Julien	1820	Nova Scotia, Canada	died of wounds	Badly wounded in the battle, he died on 14 January 1885 and was buried the same day in Ballarat Old Cemetery. Julien Avenue in the cemetery is named after him.	
John Kemp	1825	Yorkshire, England	survivor	Kemp was at the Eureka Stockade and attended the 50th-anniversary commemorations in 1904. The Morwell & Yinnar Gazette reported that he witnessed the burning of the Eureka Hotel and that there is reason to believe that his friend asked him for a box of matches that was then used by the arsonists.	
Peter Lalor	1827	Tenakil, Queens County, Ireland	wounded	The rebel commander-in-chief was shot in the left arm, which was later amputated. Secreted out of Ballarat, he remained on the run until after the amnesty. Later became a member of parliament, serving on the parliamentary executive in various roles and as speaker of the Legislative Assembly. He is buried in Melbourne General Cemetery, where a single piper played to commemorate the centenary of his death in 1989.	
Adolfus Lessman	1828	Hanover, Germany	wounded	On 2 December 1854, Peter Lalor sent Lessman for a raid on local storekeepers. He was slightly wounded in the battle. Lessman was a participant in the Eureka Stockade battle who was slightly wounded. Lessman was a lieutenant of the rifleman. To mark the second anniversary of the battle, he carried a garland of flowers in a procession.	
Andrew Lister	c.1826	North Shields, Northumberland, England	survivor	According to family tradition, he witnessed Peter Lalor get shot in the arm and the burning of Bentley's Hotel.	
John Lynch	1826	Ennis, County Clare, Ireland	survivor	One of Peter Lalor's captains, he helped to conceal the rebel leader in a hole with slabs. He was arrested later that day and released. He returned to Ballarat to deliver an oration for the second anniversary of the battle. His memoirs were published in the Austral Light from October 1893 to March 1894. Buried in the Smythesdale Cemetery.	
Francis Manallack	unknown	unknown	survivor	Manallack was at the Eureka Stockade and attended the 50th-anniversary commemoration in 1904. He was a chemist and pottery maker who invented the Melrose glaze.	
Patrick McCarthy	c.1832	unknown	survivor	His obituaries in the Melbourne Tribune (29 August 1914) and the Australian Worker (10 September 1914) mentioned he was present at the Eureka Stockade.	
Edward McGlynn	1818	Tipperary, Ireland	died of wounds	Listed by Lalor as "mortally wounded". Buried in Old Ballarat Cemetery on 3 December 1854.	
Tobias McGrath	1825	Tipperary, Ireland	survivor	His obituary published in 1916 mentions that he was one of the last few remaining Eureka veterans.	
Kenneth McKenzie	unknown	unknown	survivor?	May have been at the Eureka Stockade. In 1917, the Weekly Times noted his return visit to Ballarat after 50 years.	
Alexander McLaren	1835	Lanarkshire, Scotland	survivor	McLaren was at the Eureka Stockade and attended the 50th anniversary commemorations in 1904.	
William Melody	1828	Bonnyconnellan, County Mayo, Ireland	survivor	Known as "Melody Bill" he served with the Californian rangers at the Eureka Stockade. He was the first to respond when rebel captain Robert Burnette cried "California Rangers to the fence".	
William Mitchell	unknown	unknown	survivor	His obituary published in the Sydney Morning Herald, 10 January 1913 edition, mentions that he was at the Eureka Stockade	
William Molly	unknown	unknown	survivor	Molly was at the Eureka Stockade and detained and released. On 9 December 1854, along with Edward Sorrenson and Patrick Howard, he was indicted for high treason. Witness Edward Verit testified that near the conclusion of the attack, Molly was "being driven out" of the stockade and that "I collared him and took him. He had no arms that I saw".	
James Moran	unknown	unknown	survivor	His obituary published on the front page of the Geelong Advertiser, 10 January 1913 edition, mentions that he was at the Eureka Stockade with his friend Peter Lalor an hour before the rebel commander-in-chief was shot in the arm.	
Patrick Moore	1834	Kilfenora, County Clare, Ireland	survivor	Participated in the battle along with his brother Thaddeus Moore.	
Thaddeus Moore	1833	Kilfenora, County Clare, Ireland	died of wounds	Died of wounds on the day of the battle. Buried in Geelong on 4 December 1854. Moore Avenue in the Ballarat Old Cemetery is named after him.	
Michael Morrison	unknown	Galway, Ireland	wounded	Listed as "wounded and subsequently recovered" in the Freeman's Journal, 31 March 1888 edition	
Charles Mullaly	1819	St Mary's, Sydney	survivor	In the Portland Guardian, 24 November 1919 edition, stated that the state premier, Mr Lawson had arranged for the 101-year-old to take up residence at the Melbourne Benevolent Asylum in Cheltenham. It was said that during the Eureka Rebellion, he helped to facilitate the escape of Peter Lalor after a 100-pound bounty was offered for the rebel leader and set a match to a pile of mining licences.	
Michael Mullins	1826	Limerick, Ireland	killed in action	Died from gunshot wounds in the battle. Buried at Ballarat Old Cemetery on 5 December 1864. His name is incorrectly spelt as "Thomas Mullins" on the Digger's monument in the cemetery. Also known as Thomas Mullins.	
James Murphy	unknown	California?	survivor	Was a blacksmith and pike sharpener for the Eureka Stockade garrison. Along with others he helped to convey Peter Lalor from Ballarat to Geelong after the battle.	
James Nolan	1818/1819	Kilkenny, Ireland	survivor	His obituary in the Bendigo Advertiser, 6 September 1905 edition, mentioned that he was at the battle which took place shortly after his arrival in Ballarat.	
Michael O'Brien	1814/1815	unknown	survivor	O'Brien was at the Eureka Stockade. It is said that Father Smyth asked him to move Peter Lalor from tent to tent to help him elude capture.	
John O'Donnell	1838	Cooraclare, County Clare, Ireland	survivor	He came to Australia aboard the Royal Saxon as part of Caroline Chisholm's family unification work. Signed the Bendigo Petition in 1853. According to family tradition, on the day of the battle, he and Peter Lalor walked the perimeter of the Eureka Stockade, each heading in a different direction before Peter Lalor encountered the government forces under Captain Thomas. O'Donnell heard the shooting and quickly fled the Eureka Stockade to save his own life and avoid arrest.	
Michael O'Neil	unknown	unknown	wounded	Was possibly the brother of Margaret O'Neill, who was born in Killaloe, Country Clare, Ireland in 1837.	
Thomas O'Neill	1824	Paulstown, Kilkenny, Ireland	killed in action	Was still holding his pike during the battle while suffering from two broken legs and a musket ball lodged in his body. Listed as killed in Lalor's list. O'Neill Drive in Ballarat Old Cemetery is named after him.	
Thomas Parker	1824	unknown	killed in action	Was a blacksmith who was shot dead in defence of the Eureka Stockade. Buried on 5 December 1854.	
John Patterson	unknown	unknown	survivor	According to a family tradition that was mentioned in A History of the Ballarat Technical School in 1969, he was at the Eureka Stockade.	
Samuel Perkins	unknown	unknown	survivor	His obituary published in the Weekly Times, 4 January 1913 edition, mentions that he was one of the pioneers of mining at Sebastopol and that he was said to have been at the Eureka Stockade. Perkin's son, W.H. Perkins, was born on the Eureka lead a few weeks before the battle took place. During the fighting, his wife, Ann Perkins, took refuge with the baby in a mine shaft.	
John Phelan	1882	The Cottage, Derry Kearn Abbey, Leix, Ireland	survivor	Phelan was one of the rebels indicted and acquitted in the high treason trials. He had served as a juror on the James Scobie inquest. There is a legend that he and a miner named McGrath buried Lalor's amputated arm down an old alluvial shaft near the junction of present-day Princess and Meir Streets. Another is that he accompanied Lalor to a land auction while Lalor was still on the run. However, this seems unlikely, as Phelan was in police custody the whole time until his acquittal.	
William Quinlan	unknown	Goulburn, NSW	killed in action	Only known native-born Australian among the Eureka dead. Buried in Ballarat Old Cemetery.	
Edward Quinn	1818	County Cavan, Ireland	killed in action	Listed as killed in Lalor's casualty report. Buried in Old Ballarat Cemetery on 4 December 1854. Quin (sic) Drive in the cemetery is named after him.	
Henry Reed	unknown	unknown	survivor	Reed (or Read) was one of the rebels indicted and acquitted for high treason. Sub-Inspector Samuel Furnell saw Reed inside the Eureka Stockade on 3 December 1854, and it was alleged that he had fired on trooper Michael Lawler.	
Carl Reinhardt	unknown	unknown	wounded	Although not mentioned in any official records, according to family tradition, he was wounded at the Eureka Stockade and, like many others, managed to escape into the surrounding bush. He was known as "the General" or "the Broomstick General" as a result of his efforts to impart military training and discipline to members of the rebel garrison.	
John Robertson	unknown	Scotland	killed in action	Listed as killed in Peter Lalor's report. Signed the Benden S Hassell compensation petition in 1855.	
Charles Ross	1827	Toronto, Canada	died of wounds	Was one of the rebel captains believed to have been involved in designing the Eureka Flag. Sustained a wound to the groin whilst defending the flag pole during the battle. He was taken on a stretcher to the Star Hotel, where he died later that day. When the publican informed a soldier of Ross' death, they replied, "damned glad at it". Buried in the Diggers' enclosure at Ballarat Old Cemetery on 7 December 1854.	
Thomas Rowlands	unknown	unknown	survivor	According to a letter published in the Courier, 2 December 1904 edition, he spent the night before the battle at the Eureka Stockade. His tent was near where the Charlie Napier Hotel stood, and his neighbour was James Scobie.	
Luke Sheehan	1835	County Galway, Ireland	wounded	Was one of the rebel captains leading the pikemen at the Eureka Stockade. Avoided capture by the authorities. Listed as "wounded and since recovered" in Lalor's casualty report.	
George Smith	unknown	unknown	survivor	May be the same George Smith who signed the Bendigo Petition in 1853. In the Australian Town and Country Journal, 15 June 1901 edition, it was stated that he was at Eureka Stockade.	
Richard John Smith	unknown	unknown	wounded	On 2 December 1854 he was passing by the Eureka Stockade when some rebels asked him to join the garrison. Had been drinking that night alongside many rebels who fell asleep with their clothes on "just lying down anywhere" and awoke when the battle began. Was immediately shot in the leg. He stood alongside planks until the end of the fighting and then surrendered himself. Witnessed the routed rebel garrison fleeing the stockade. Was arrested and subsequently released.	
Jacob Sorenson	unknown	unknown	survivor	Sorenson was one of the rebels indicted and acquitted of high treason. He was described as heavily tattoed and illiterate. Police Sergeant George King testified that Sorenson was running among the mineshafts just after the shooting had ceased. King then found him in a tent holding a revolver. Sorenson surrendered, and then Police Inspector Henry Foster searched him and found some rounds, caps and a powder flask.	
Henry Sutherland	1832	Orkney Islands, Scotland	survivor	Was a doctor who befriended Peter Lalor and Duncan Gillies. His obituaries published in the Dubbo Dispatch and Wellington Independent (23 June 1916) and the Maryborough Chronicle (8 June 1916) mention that he was at the Eureka Stockade. He was a pikeman who helped Peter Lalor to avoid capture.	
Francis Symons	1829	Nankervis Farm, St Enoder, Cornwall	wounded	Was probably the "Frank Symons" listed as "wounded and since recovered" in Lalor's casualty report. Along with Richard Symons was a signatory to the Bendigo Petition in 1853.	
James Symmons	unknown	England	wounded	Symons is said to have been wounded in the battle.	
Edward Thonen	1827	Elberfeld, Westphalia, Prussia	killed in action	Was one of Lalor's rebel captains. Carboni records that amid the shooting, "Ross and his division northward and Thonen and his division southward, and both in front of the gully, under cover of the slabs, answered with such a smart fire". He was present at the meeting where Lalor was confirmed as leader and stood as seconder of the motion. Thonen was found dead with a mouthful of bullets. He was buried in Ballarat Old Cemetery on 5 December 1854. Thonen Drive in the cemetery is named after him.	
Tom the Blacksmith	unknown	Hanover	died of wounds	Was a friend of Harry Schmedding (aka Dutch Harry). Manufactured pies for the Eureka Stockade garrison. John Lynch said that a witness to Tom's death claimed he died in agony some hours after the battle. Mentioned only as "Tom the Blacksmith" in Lalor's casualty report.	
John Torpy	1827	County Clare, Ireland	survivor	Was one of complainants to the board of inquiry investigating the death of James Scobie under the surname "Toopy". Also complained about one of the presiding officers of the inquest, James Johnstone, assistant gold commissioner for the gravel pits in Ballarat.	
Charles Trompf	1831	Baldiau (now Piatodorozny), near Konigsburg, East Prussia	survivor	Trompf was at the Eureka Stockade and attended the 50th-anniversary reunion in 1904. Addressed a protest meeting in 1859 at Maryborough that concerned the presence of Chinese miners in the area.	
Michael Tuohy	1830	Scariff, County Clare, Ireland	survivor	Was part of the contingent that traveled from Creswick contingent to the Eureka Stockade. He was detained by Corporal William Richardson whilst attempting to flee the stockade in possession of a double-barrelled shotgun. Subsequently, spent most of his fortune pursuing a compensation claim over the loss of his mine.	
Frederick Vern	unknown	Hanover, Germany?	deserted?	Vern was one of Lalor's rebel captains. The fortification of the Eureka lead was apparently overseen by Vern, who had apparently received instruction in military methods. He gave fiery speeches at mass protest meetings, and Carboni says he boasted of being able to form a company of German miners. Later accused of fleeing the stockade at the first sign of trouble and is suspected of being a double agent.	
James Warner	1826	County Cork, Ireland	wounded	Listed as "wounded and since recovered" in Lalor's casualty report.	
James Wilburd	unknown	New Zealand	wounded	His obituary, published in Waimate Daily Advertiser, 1 March 1918 edition, mentions that he was one of the five remaining New Zealanders who were at the Eureka Stockade. Wilburd was wounded in the battle and always retained his Winchester rifle.	
William Williams	unknown	unknown	wounded	His obituary published in Alexandra Standard Newspaper, 3 May 1901 edition, mentions that he was at the Eureka Stockade.	
Charles Wilson	unknown	unknown	wounded	His obituary published in The Beaudesert Desert, 22 February 1918 edition, mentions he received a bullet wound to his left arm at the Eureka Stockade.	
William Wood	c.1829-35	Gloucestershire, England	survivor	His obituary published in the Kalgoorlie Miner, 15 June 1907 edition, mentions that he was at the Eureka Stockade.	

=== Non combatants ===
The Eureka Stockade encompassed an area of existing mines, and not all of the residents in the vicinity actively supported the armed struggle. There are a number of recorded deaths and injuries among non-combatants during the Eureka Rebellion. There were also economic losses, such as those suffered by Michael Noonan, who lost his store and received 70 pounds in compensation. His spouse was also assaulted at the time of the battle, and he was detained for five days after being arrested while standing near the St Alphius chapel. It has been thought that all those killed during the battle were men. However, the diary of Charles Evans describes a funeral cortege for a woman who was mercilessly butchered by a mounted trooper while pleading for the life of her husband. Her name and the fate and identity of her husband remain unknown.

Following the fall of the stockade, Hotham proclaimed martial law on 6 December 1854 with no lights allowed in any tent after 8 pm "even though the legal basis for it was dubious". There were a number of unprovoked shots fired from the government camp towards the diggings. Unrelated first-hand accounts variously state that a woman, her infant child and several men were killed or wounded in an episode of indiscriminate shooting. (Note: Thomas Pierson's diary states that:... some not understanding marshall (sic) law did not put out their lights and the soldiers fired into the tents and killed 2 men and one woman and wounded others, although we were half a mile off we heard the balls whistling over our tents. Charles Evan's diary also mentions that Among the victims of last night's unpardonable recklessness were a woman and her infant. The same ball which murdered the mother, ... passed through the child as it lay sleeping in her arms.... Another sufferer is a highly respectable storekeeper, who had his thighbone shattered by a ball as he was walking toward the township.)

Name	Birth year	Birthplace	Status	Legacy and notes	Ref(s)
William Adams	unknown	unknown	wounded	Adams lived in the vicinity of the Eureka Stockade and was wounded by gunfire three times whilst trying to get his family to safety. He was taken prisoner and spent a week convalescing at the government camp hospital. Adams would later unsuccessfully claim 937 pounds in damages for loss of property and false imprisonment.	
Frank Hasleham	1828	unknown	wounded	Hasleham was a correspondent for the Geelong Advertiser and Melbourne Herald who supplemented his income by prospecting. He was camping on the Eureka lead 300 yards away from the stockade on an adjacent hill when he was shot through the right shoulder by the mounted police. The trooper rode up to him and then fired. Carboni records that Hasleham lay bleeding in handcuffs for two hours before a friend found a blacksmith to remove the restraints. He was awarded 400 pounds in compensation for his injuries. His brief description of the Eureka Stockade was published in the Argus, 29 December 1854 edition.	
Henry Powell	c.1831	unknown	died of wounds	Powell had come from Creswick on 2 December 1854 to visit a friend, William Cox. Cox's tent was close to the Eureka Stockade. When he emerged after the battle, police officer Arthur Akehurst told him he was being taken prisoner. Akehurst then struck Powell on the head with a sword, slashing his body several times, before mounted troopers rode over him. He gave a statement about these events before his death on 9 December 1854 and was buried two days later. There was a note in the Mount Alexander Mail, 22 December 1854 edition, that his coffin draped in a Union Jack was placed on a cart followed by around six mourners. Powell's was the only inquest into any of the deaths that arose from the Eureka Stockade. His testimony, which was given in the presence of Captain Gordon Evans, was disallowed. Akehurst was held liable by the coroner for wilful and felonious death, being later acquitted by a jury in Melbourne.	
Llewellyn Rowlands	1821	Wales	killed	Rowlands was talking to Benjamin Welch about a quarter of a mile from the Eureka Stockade when they noticed soldiers and prisoners near the Catholic St Alphius chapel. He failed to surrender immediately when asked by a trooper who deliberately dismounted and shot Rowlands through the heart. Buried on 4 December 1854 at Ballarat Old Cemetery.	
Jan Vennick	1823	Koedijk, the Netherlands	wounded	Sometimes referred to as John Fenwick, Vennick was a non-combatant who was indicted and acquitted of high treason. He shared a tent with Cornelius Peters and Le Fronzis Romeo that was situated 300 yards away from the Eureka Stockade. At the time of the battle, German miner Edward Bloehm roused the three of them. The police surrounded the tent and called on the occupants to surrender. Vennick emerged wearing red trousers gaining the nickname "the captain". He was handcuffed and then struck with a sword, nearly severing his ear and sustaining three blows to the head. At the treason trials, Peters was able to provide Vennick with an alibi, testifying that Vennick was working with him all day on 2 December 1854 and had been in the tent all night and on the morning when the stockade was overrun.	

== Notable impostors ==
John Lishman Potter claimed that he was the last surviving defender of the Eureka Stockade, which nobody questioned during his lifetime. However, later research has shown that Potter was aboard the Falcon en route to Melbourne from Liverpool on the day of the battle.

== Bibliography ==
- Appleton, Richard, ed. (1983). Australian Encyclopaedia Volume Four ELE-GIB (4th ed.). Sydney: Grolier Society. ISBN 978-0-95-966042-5.
- Blake, Gregory (2012). Eureka Stockade: A ferocious and bloody battle. Newport: Big Sky Publishing. ISBN 978-1-92-213204-8.
- Blake, Gregory (2009). To Pierce the Tyrant's Heart: The Battle for the Eureka Stockade. Loftus, ACT: Australian Army History Unit. ISBN 978-0-98-047532-6.
- Blake, Les (1979). Peter Lalor: the man from Eureka. Belmont: Neptune Press. ISBN 978-0-90-913140-1.
- Carboni, Raffaello (1855). The Eureka Stockade: The Consequence of Some Pirates Wanting a Quarterdeck Rebellion. Melbourne: J. P. Atkinson and Co. – via Project Gutenberg.
- Corfield, Justin; Wickham, Dorothy; Gervasoni, Clare (2004). The Eureka Encyclopedia. Ballarat: Ballarat Heritage Services. ISBN 978-1-87-647861-2.
- FitzSimons, Peter (2012). Eureka: The Unfinished Revolution. Sydney: Random House Australia. ISBN 978-1-74-275525-0.
- Harvey, Jack (1994). Eureka Rediscovered: In search of the site of the historic stockade. Ballarat: University of Ballarat. ISBN 978-0-90-802664-7.
- Hotham, Charles (1978). Three Despatches From Sir Charles Hotham. Melbourne: Public Record Office. ISBN 978-0-72-411706-2.
- Lynch, John (1940). Story of the Eureka Stockade: Epic Days of the Early Fifties at Ballarat (Reprint ed.). Melbourne: Australian Catholic Truth Society.
- MacFarlane, Ian (1995). Eureka from the Official Records. Melbourne: Public Record Office Victoria. ISBN 978-0-73-066011-8.
- O'Brien, Bob (1992). Massacre at Eureka: The untold story. Kew: Australian Scholarly Publishing. ISBN 978-1-87-560604-7.
- Smith, F. B., ed. (1965). Historical Studies: Eureka Supplement (2nd ed.). Melbourne: Melbourne University Press.
- Thomas, John Wellesley (3 December 1854). Captain Thomas reports on the attack on the Eureka Stockade to the Major Adjutant General (Report). Archived from the original on 4 April 2019 – via Public Record Office Victoria.
- Three Despatches From Sir Charles Hotham. Melbourne: Public Record Office. 1981.
- Wenban, Ray (1958). The Revolt at Eureka. Pictorial Social Studies. Vol. 16. Sydney: Australian Visual Education.
- Withers, William (1999). History of Ballarat and Some Ballarat Reminiscences. Ballarat: Ballarat Heritage Service. ISBN 978-1-87-647878-0.
- Wright, Clare (2013). The Forgotten Rebels of Eureka. Melbourne: Text Publishing. ISBN 978-1-92214-737-0.
