= Battle of the Eureka Stockade =

1854 military conflict in Victoria, Australia

- Part of the Eureka Rebellion
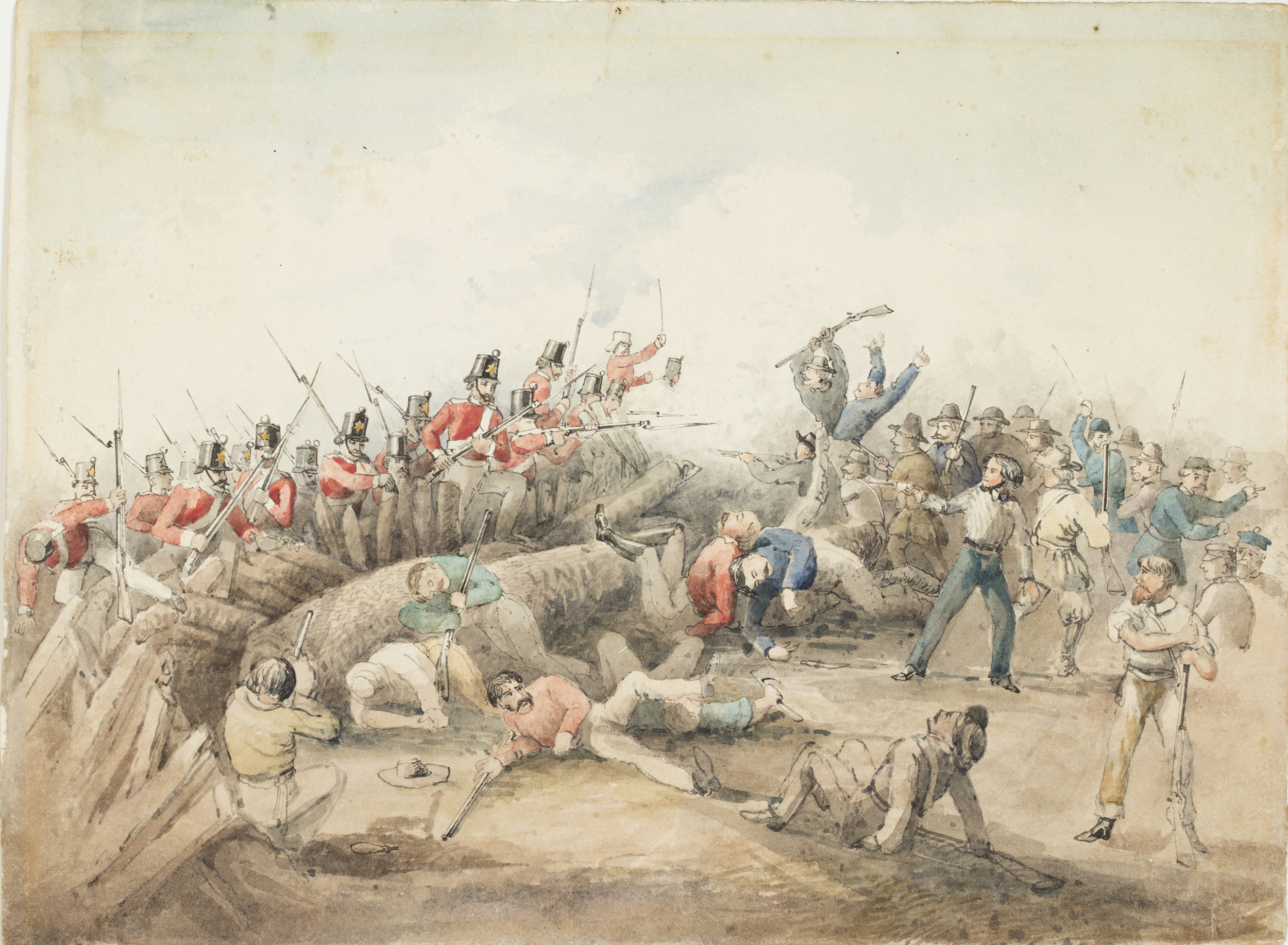
- Eureka Stockade Riot by John Black Henderson (1854)
Date	3 December 1854
Location	Ballarat East (now Eureka), Ballarat, Victoria
Result	Miners' rebellion defeated by the Victorian colonial government

Belligerents
(United Kingdom) Colony of Victoria: (United Kingdom) 12th Regiment; (United Kingdom) 40th Regiment; (United Kingdom) Victoria Police	Stockade rebels

Commanders and leaders
(United Kingdom) Charles Hotham (United Kingdom) Robert Rede (United Kingdom) J. W. Thomas (United Kingdom) Charles Pasley	Peter Lalor (WIA); Henry Ross (DOW)

Strength
276	120–230+

Casualties and losses
8+ dead (2 KIA); 11–30 wounded	22–60+ dead (14+ KIA); 12+ wounded 120+ prisoners (including non combatants)

The Battle of the Eureka Stockade was fought in Ballarat, Victoria, Australia, on 3 December 1854, between gold miners and the colonial forces of Australia. It was the culmination of the 1851–1854 Eureka Rebellion during the Victorian gold rush. The fighting resulted in at least 27 deaths and many injuries, the majority of casualties being rebels. The miners had various grievances, chiefly the cost of mining permits and the officious way the system was enforced.

== Background ==
The colony of Victoria was created on 1 July 1851, gaining autonomy within the British Empire after a decade of de facto independence from New South Wales. The Victorian constitution was awaiting a ratification by the Imperial parliament. An election for a provisional legislative council was held, with the chamber having 20 elected and ten appointed members subject to property-based franchise and membership requirements.

Gold prospectors were offered 200 guineas for making discoveries within 200 miles (320 km) of Melbourne. In August 1851, the news was received worldwide that, on top of several earlier finds, Thomas Hiscock, outside of Buninyong in central Victoria, had found still more deposits. As gold fever took hold, the colony's population increased from 77,000 in 1851 to 198,496 in 1853. Among this number was "a heavy sprinkling of ex-convicts, gamblers, thieves, rogues and vagabonds of all kinds".

The local authorities soon found themselves with fewer police officers and lacking the infrastructure needed to support the expansion of the mining industry. The number of public servants, factory and farm workers leaving for the goldfields to seek their fortune led to a chronic labour shortage that needed to be resolved. The response was a universal mining tax based on time stayed, rather than what was seen as the more equitable option, being an export duty levied only on gold found, meaning it was always designed to make life unprofitable for most prospectors.

Licence inspections, known as "digger hunts", were treated as a great sport and "carried out in the style of an English fox-hunt" by mounted officials who received a fifty per cent commission from any fines imposed. Many recruits were former prisoners from Tasmania and prone to brutal means, having been sentenced to serve in the military. Miners were often arrested for not carrying licences on their person because of the typically wet and dirty conditions in the mines, then subjected to such indignities as being chained to trees and logs overnight.

In the years leading up to the Eureka Stockade, several mass public meetings were held to address the miners' grievances. The Bendigo Petition received over 5,000 signatures and was presented to Lieutenant-Governor Charles La Trobe by a miner's delegation in August 1853. There were also delegations received by the Ballarat gold commissioner Robert William Rede and La Trobe's successor Charles Hotham in October and November 1854. The ever-present "physical force" faction of the mining tax protest movement gained the ascendancy over those who advocated "moral force", including John Basson Humffray, after a judicial enquiry into the murder of miner James Scobie outside the Eureka Hotel. There was no finding of guilt regarding the owner, James Bently, who was deeply suspected of involvement, with the case being presided over by a police magistrate accused of having a conflict of interest.

Then, there was an uproar over the arrest of Catholic Father Smyth's disabled Armenian servant Johannes Gregorious. He was subjected to police brutality and false arrest for licence evasion, even though it was revealed he was exempt from the requirement. Gregorious was instead convicted of assaulting a constable and fined 5 pounds, despite the court hearing testimony to the contrary. The discontent began to spiral out of control when a mob of many thousands of aggrieved miners burned the Eureka Hotel on 17 October 1854.

On 28 November 1854, there was a skirmish as the approaching 12th (East Suffolk) Regiment of Foot had their wagon train looted in the vicinity of the Eureka lead, where the rebels ultimately made their stand. The next day, the Eureka Flag appeared on the platform for the first time. Mining licences were burnt at the final fiery mass meeting of the Ballarat Reform League – the miners' lobby. The league's founding charter proclaims that "it is the inalienable right of every citizen to have a voice in making the laws he is called upon to obey" and "taxation without representation is tyranny", in the language of the United States Declaration of Independence.

On 30 November 1854, there was further rioting where missiles were once again directed at military and law enforcement by the protesting miners who had henceforth refused to cooperate with licence inspections en masse. That afternoon there was a paramilitary display on Bakery Hill. The oath-swearing ceremony took place whilst the insurgents were gathered around the Eureka Flag, and military companies were then formed. In the preceding weeks, the men of violence had already been aiming musket balls at the barely fortified government camp during the night.

== British army commanders ==
Captain John Thomas led the attack on the Eureka Stockade, with Captain Charles Pasley as his second in command. The government forces at the Ballarat camp were under the immediate command of resident gold commissioner Robert Rede. Overall command was exercised by the executive lieutenant governor Sir Charles Hotham and the high commander of the British colonial forces in Australia, Major General Sir Robert Nickle.

== Victorian police commanders ==
The police inspector at Ballarat was Henry Foster. Other notable Victorian police commanders at the Eureka Stockade include sub-inspectors Ladislaus Kossak, Samuel Furnell, Thomas Langley, and Hussey Chomley.

== Rebel commanders ==
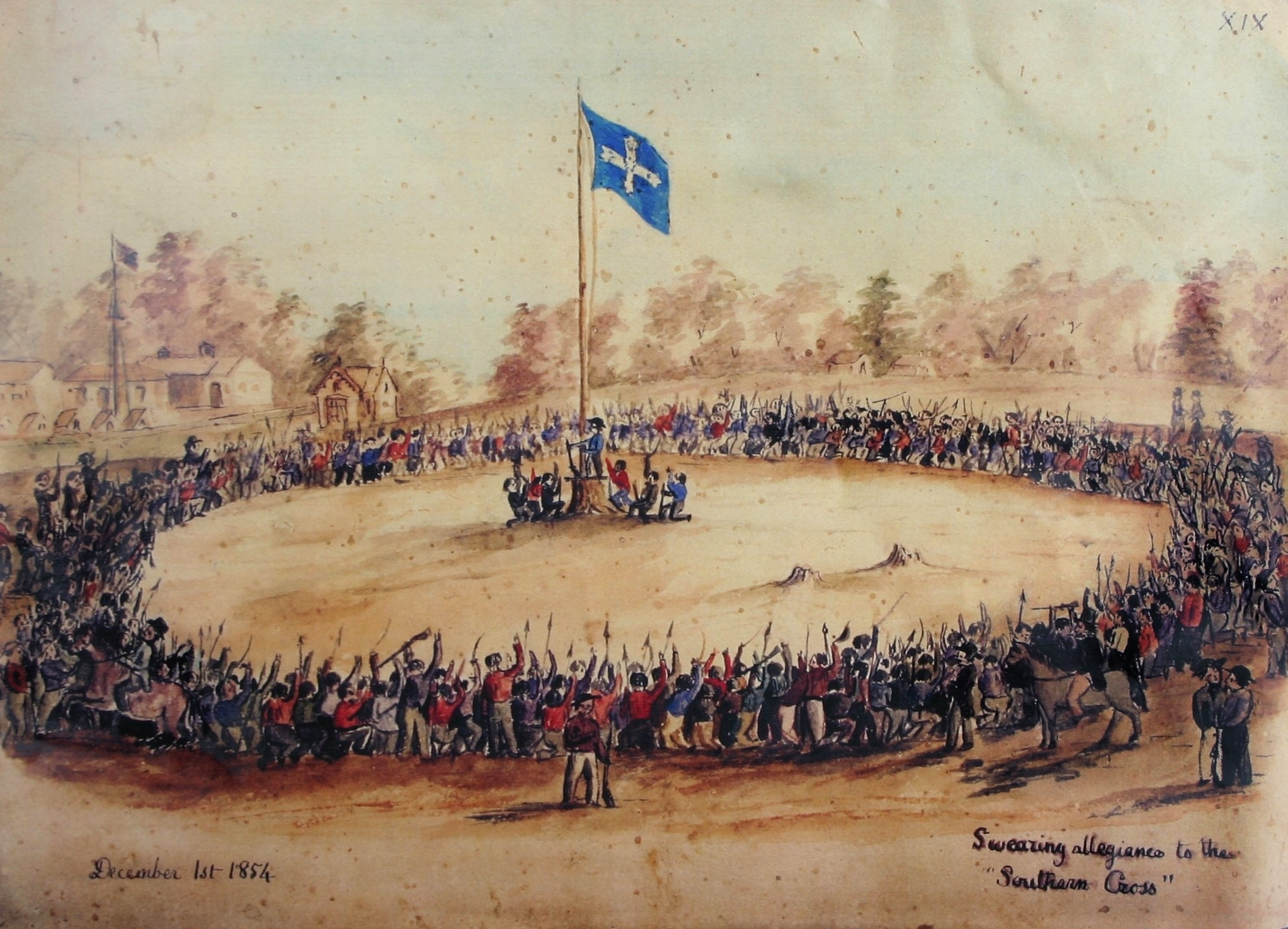
Swearing Allegiance to the Southern Cross by Charles Doudiet (1854)

It appears that the terms "captain" and "lieutenant" were used interchangeably within the Eureka Stockade garrison. The front cover of Raffaello Carboni's 1855 The Eureka Stockade features a rendition of the Eureka Flag with diamond-shaped stars and the words "When Ballarat unfurled the Southern Cross, the bearer was Toronto's Captain Ross". Yet Peter Lalor's casualty list records "Lieutenant Ross" as "wounded and since dead". It appears that Frederick Vern was also more commonly known as a rebel "colonel" instead.

A number of people who played key roles in the Eureka Rebellion and were defending the Eureka Stockade at some point lived in tents situated outside the stockade and were on assignment or otherwise absent when the surprise attack took place on Sunday morning, 3 December 1854.

=== Commander in chief ===
Name	Period of service in the rank, promotions and previous military experience. Termination of service	Commentary
Peter Lalor	At his first public appearance, Lalor acted as secretary for the 17 November 1854 meeting that led to the burning of Bentley's Hotel and moved in favour of establishing a central rebel executive. At the 30 November 1854 meeting on Bakery Hill, he took the initiative of mounting a stump armed with a rifle and declaring "Liberty". Lalor called for the formation of paramilitary companies and presided over the Eureka Flag raising and oath-swearing ceremonies. Raffaello Carboni recalls a meeting at Diamond's store where he was elected as "president" and "commander in chief" of the rebel camp.	He was wounded in action during the battle with his left arm later requiring amputation. Lalor was hidden and secreted out of the stockade by supporters. He remained on the run until a general amnesty was granted in May 1855. Lalor became a member of parliament and later served as a minister of the crown and Speaker of the Victorian Legislative Assembly.

=== Secretary of war ===
Name	Period of service in the rank, promotions and previous military experience. Termination of service	Commentary
Alfred Black	Black was the rebel secretary of war at the Eureka Stockade.	He was responsible for writing a list of the rebel captains who had stepped forward at the 30 November 1854 oath swearing and Eureka Flag raising ceremony at Bakery Hill.

=== Colonels, captains and lieutenants ===
Name	Period of service in the rank, promotions and previous military experience. Termination of service	Commentary
George Black	Black was one of Lalor's captains who had been sent to go to Creswick Creek to raise more support for the rebellion. The Cyclopedia of Australasia states that he "was at Ballarat at the Eureka outbreak, which he did something to bring about, but was not in the stockade at the time of the attack".	He was a Chartist and influential member of the Ballarat Reform League. Black bought and edited the radical Ballarat newspaper, the Diggers Advocate, founded by George Thompson and Henry Holyoake. The Diggers Advocate played an important part in the prelude to the Eureka Rebellion. Black proposed the motion in favour of adult male suffrage and full and fair representation at the Ballarat Reform League meeting at Bakery Hill on 11 November 1854 and served as the league's secretary. Initial reward posters issued by the Victorian government offered a 400-pound reward for information about the whereabouts of "Lawler and Black".
Henry Ross	Ross was one of the captains of the rebel garrison. He was present at the oath-swearing and Eureka flag-raising ceremony at Bakery Hill on 30 November 1854. Ross acted as the Eureka Flag bearer at the head of about 1,000 rebels who marched in double file from Bakery Hill to the Eureka lead, where the stockade was situated. He received a groin injury during the battle while in the vicinity of the flag pole and died later that day after being taken to the Star Hotel.	There is a popular tradition where the flag design is credited to Ballarat Reform League member Henry Ross who was originally from Toronto, Canada. A. W. Crowe recounted in 1893 that "it was Ross who gave the order for the insurgents' flag at Darton and Walker's". Crowe's story is confirmed in that there were advertisements in the Ballarat Times dating from October–November 1854 for Darton and Walker, manufacturers of tents, tarpaulin and flags, situated at the Gravel Pits.
John Lynch	One of Peter Lalor's captains, he helped to conceal the rebel leader in a hole with slabs. He was arrested later that day and discharged at the committal hearings.	He returned to Ballarat to deliver an oration for the second anniversary of the battle. Lynch's memoirs were published in the Austral Light from October 1893 to March 1894.
Robert Burnete	Burnete was one of Peter Lalor's rebel captains in command of the "Independent Californian Rangers Revolver Brigade".	He later claimed to have fired the first shot of the battle by either side, which killed Captain Wise. Carried a rifle.
James Herbert McGill	McGill was an American who commanded the "Californian Rifle Brigade". He mobilised 200 members of the rebel garrison and established the stockade sentry system. In a fateful decision, McGill left with most of his force to intercept rumoured British reinforcements en route from Melbourne.	In the aftermath of the battle, McGill fled from Ballarat by stagecoach while dressed as a woman.
Michael Hanrahan	Hanrahan was chosen as the captain of the pikemen at the Eureka Stockade. In the days leading up to the battle, he was leading small groups of pikemen along the road to Melbourne, looking to interdict and delay any opposing forces converging on the stockade. After waiting all day on 3 December 1854, the pikemen returned to discover that the stockade had fallen.	Later felt ashamed of his participation in the Eureka Rebellion and yet kept a firearm hidden in a wall in his house.
Edward Thonen	Thonen was a Prussian who served as one of Lalor's rebel captains and was killed in action during the battle. Carboni records that amid the shooting, "Ross and his division northward and Thonen and his division southward, and both in front of the gully, under cover of the slabs, answered with such a smart fire".	He was present at the meeting where Lalor was confirmed as leader and stood as seconder of the motion. Thonen came to the goldfields as a lemonade seller and was known as a strong chess player.
Frederick Vern	The fortification of the Eureka lead was apparently overseen by Vern.	He gave fiery speeches at mass protest meetings, and Carboni says he boasted of being able to form a company of German miners. Later accused of fleeing the stockade at the first sign of trouble and is suspected of being a double agent.
Timothy Hayes	Hayes was one of the mining tax protest movement's key agitators. Chaired the 29 November 1854 meeting on Bakery Hill, where the Eureka Flag was first displayed, and mining permits were burned. He incited the crowd, shouting from the platform, "Are you ready to die?" Carboni mentions Hayes as being present at the meeting in Diamond's store where Lalor was confirmed as rebel commander-in-chief.	He was detained about 100 yards from the Eureka Stockade after the battle and taken to Melbourne. Put on trial for high treason and acquitted. Subsequently supported Peter Lalor's parliamentary nomination.
Patrick Curtain	Carboni records that Curtain gave him his iron pike in exchange for Carboni's sword when he was initially chosen as captain of the pikemen. The Eureka Encyclopedia says he appointed Michael Hanrahan as his lieutenant. Later, Carboni mentions that Hanrahan had been made captain of the pikemen and Curtain was his lieutenant.	Curtain's store was situated inside the stockade and was destroyed in the fighting, and he made a claim for compensation.
John Manning	Manning was a journalist who Carboni mentions as being present at the meeting where Peter Lalor was confirmed as rebel leader. Inspector Carter discovered him in the stockade's armoury when he stormed the tent. Carter arrested Manning himself and placed him into the custody of Lieutenant Richards of the 40th Regiment.	He was subsequently indicted and acquitted in the 1855 Victorian High Treason trials.
Luke Sheehan	Sheehan was one of the rebel captains leading the pikemen at the Eureka Stockade. Avoided capture by the authorities.	Listed as "wounded and since recovered" in Lalor's casualty report.
Raffaello Carboni	Acted as Lalor's interpreter when dealing with some of the European miners. He was an eyewitness to the battle, seeking shelter in the chimney of his dwelling that was nearby the stockade.	Like many of the immigrant miners, Carboni was involved in the European Revolutions of 1848. He was indicted and acquitted in the 1855 Victorian High Treason trials. Eureka folklore is deeply indebted to Carboni, who published the only full-length eyewitness account of the Eureka Rebellion in 1855. Among other things, he documents the rebel command structure.
Adolfus Lessman	Lessman was a German from Hanover. On 2 December 1854, Peter Lalor sent Lessman for a raid on local storekeepers. He was a lieutenant of the rifleman at the Eureka Stockade and was slightly wounded in the battle.	To mark the second anniversary of the battle, he carried a garland of flowers in a procession.

== Fortification of the Eureka lead ==
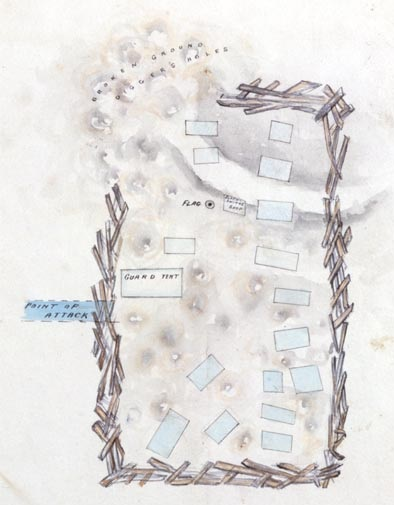
A plan of the Eureka Stockade in the 1855 Victorian high treason trials

Following the oath swearing and Eureka Flag raising ceremony on Bakery Hill, about 1,000 rebels marched in double file to the Eureka lead where the Eureka Stockade was constructed over the next few days. It consisted of pit props held together as spikes by rope and overturned horse carts. Raffaello Carboni described it in his 1855 memoirs as being "higgledy piggledy". It encompassed an area said to be one acre (about 4,000 m²); however, that is difficult to reconcile with other estimates that have the dimensions of the stockade as being around 100 feet (30 m) x 200 feet (61 m), less than half that size. Contemporaneous representations vary and render the stockade as either rectangular or semi-circular. Testimony was heard at the high treason trials for the Eureka rebels that the stockade was four to seven feet high in places and was unable to be negotiated on horseback without being reduced. (Note: Peter Lalor himself said the wooden structure was never meant to be a fortress, saying "it was nothing more than an enclosure to keep our own men together, and was never erected with an eye to military defence". However Peter FitzSimons says that Lalor may have downplayed the fact that the Eureka Stockade may have been intended as something of a fortress, at a time when "it was very much in his interests" to do so.)

Hotham feared that the goldfield's terrain would greatly favour the rebel snipers. Rede would instead order an early morning surprise attack on the rebel camp. Carboni details the rebel dispositions along:

The shepherds' holes inside the lower part of the stockade had been turned into rifle-pits, and were now occupied by Californians of the I.C. Rangers' Brigade, some twenty or thirty in all, who had kept watch at the 'outposts' during the night.

The location of the stockade has been described by Eureka man John Lynch as "appalling from a defensive point of view" as it was situated on "a gentle slope, which exposed a sizeable portion of its interior to fire from nearby high ground". (Note: A detachment of 800 men, which included "two field pieces and two howitzers" under the commander in chief of the British forces in Australia, Major General Sir Robert Nickle, who had seen action during the 1798 Irish rebellion, arrived after the insurgency had been put down. In 1860, Withers stated in a lecture that "The site was most injudicious for any purpose of defence as it was easily commanded from adjacent spots, and the ease with which the place could be taken was apparent to the most unprofessional eye".)

In the early hours of 1 December, the rebels were observed to be massing on Bakery Hill, but a government raiding party found the area vacated. The riot act was read to a mob that had gathered around Bath's Hotel, with mounted police breaking up the unlawful assembly. A three-man miner's delegation met with Commissioner Rede to present a peace proposal; however, Rede was suspicious of the chartist undercurrent of the anti-mining tax movement and rejected the proposals as being the way forward.

The rebels sent out scouts and established picket lines in order to have advance warning of Rede's movements and a request for reinforcements to the other mining settlements. The "moral force" faction had withdrawn from the protest movement as the men of violence moved into the ascendancy. The rebels continued to fortify their position as 300-400 men arrived from Creswick's Creek, and Carboni recalls they were: "dirty and ragged, and proved the greatest nuisance. One of them, Michael Tuohy, behaved valiantly". Once foraging parties were organised, there was a rebel garrison of around 200 men. Amid the Saturday night revelry, low munitions, and major desertions, Lalor ordered that any man attempting to leave the stockade be shot.

=== Vinegar Hill blunder: Irish dimension factors in dwindling numbers at stockade ===
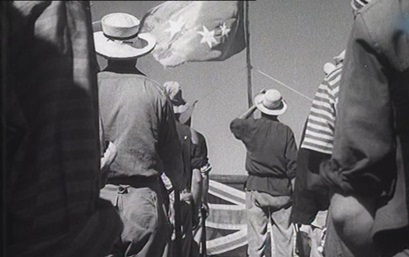
The oath swearing scene from the 1949 motion picture Eureka Stockade featuring the Union Jack beneath the Eureka Flag.

An extract of an Argus report, 4 December 1854.

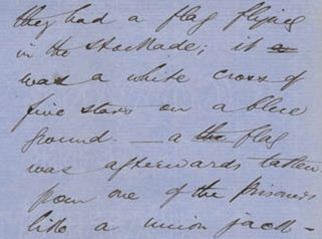
An extract of an affidavit by Hugh King, 7 December 1854

The Argus newspaper of 4 December 1854 reported that the Union Jack "had" to be hoisted underneath the Eureka Flag at the stockade and that both flags were in possession of the foot police. (Note: Peter FitzSimons has questioned whether this contemporaneous report of the otherwise unaccounted-for Union Jack known as the Eureka Jack being present is accurate.) Among those willing to credit the first report of the battle as being true and correct it has been theorised that the hoisting of a Union Jack at the stockade was possibly an 11th-hour response to the divided loyalties among the heterogeneous rebel force which was in the process of melting away.

At one point, up to 1,500 of 17,280 men in Ballarat were garrisoning the stockade, with as few as 120 taking part in the battle. Lalor's choice of Vinegar Hill as the password the night before the battle did not resonate with the non-Irish members of the protest movement and has been cited as the main reason why support for the armed rebellion collapsed. Support for the Eureka Rebellion fell away among those who were otherwise disposed to resist the military as word spread that the question of Irish home rule had become involved. There were miners from Bendigo, Forrest Creek, and Creswick who were converging on Ballarat to join the rebel garrison. The latter contingent was said to number a thousand men, "but when the news circulated that Irish independence had crept into the movement, almost all turned back". FitzSimons points out that although the number of reinforcements converging on Ballarat was probably closer to 500, there is no doubt that as a result of the choice of password "the Stockade is denied many strong-armed men because of the feeling that the Irish have taken over". Withers states that:

Lalor, it is said, gave 'Vinegar Hill' as the night's pass-word, but neither he nor his adherents expected that the fatal action of Sunday was coming, and some of his followers, incited by the sinister omen of the pass-word, abandoned that night what they saw was a badly organised and not very hopeful movement. (Note: One survivor of the battle stated that "the collapse of the rising at Ballarat may be regarded as mainly attributable to the password given by Lalor on the night before the assault". William Craig also recalled that "Many at Ballaarat, who were disposed before that to resist the military, now quietly withdrew from the movement". Asked by one of his subordinates for the "night pass", he gave "Vinegar Hill", the site of a battle during the 1798 Irish rebellion. The 1804 Castle Hill uprising, also known as the second battle of Vinegar Hill, was the site of a convict rebellion in the colony of New South Wales, involving mainly Irish transportees, some of whom were at Vinegar Hill.)

In his memoirs, Lynch states: "On the afternoon of Saturday we had a force of seven hundred men on whom we thought we could rely". However, there was a false alarm from the picket line during the night. The subsequent roll call revealed there had been a sizable desertion that Lynch says "ought to have been seriously considered, but it was not".

It is certain that Irish-born people were strongly represented at the Eureka Stockade. Most of the rebels inside the stockade at the time of the battle were Irish, and the area where the defensive position was established was overwhelmingly populated by Irish miners. Blainey has advanced the view that the white cross of the Eureka Flag is "really an Irish cross rather than being [a] configuration of the Southern Cross".

In 2009, military historian Gregory Blake advanced the theory that two flags may have been flown on the day of the battle, as the miners were claiming to be defending their British rights. Blake leaves open the possibility that the flag being carried by the prisoner had been souvenired from the flag pole as the routed garrison was fleeing the stockade. (Note: In a signed contemporaneous affidavit dated 7 December 1854, Private Hugh King, who was at the battle serving with the 40th (the 2nd Somersetshire) Regiment of Foot, recalled that a "flag was afterwards taken from one of the prisoners like a union jack". There was a further report in the Argus, 9 December 1854 edition, stating that Hugh King had given live testimony at the committal hearings for the Eureka rebels where he stated that the flag was found "rollen up in the breast of a[n] [unidentified] prisoner".)

=== Departing detachment of Independent Californian Rangers leaves small garrison behind ===
Amid the rising number of rebels absent without leave throughout 2 December, a contingent of 200 Americans under James McGill arrived at 4 pm. Styled as "The Independent Californian Rangers' Revolver Brigade", they had horses and were equipped with sidearms and Mexican knives. In a fateful decision, McGill decided to take most of his two hundred Californian Rangers away from the stockade to intercept rumoured British reinforcements coming from Melbourne. Many Saturday night revellers within the rebel garrison went back to their own tents, assuming that the government camp would not attack on the Sabbath day. A small contingent of miners remained at the stockade overnight, which the spies reported to Rede. Common estimates for the size of the garrison at the time of the attack on 3 December range from 120 to 150 men.

According to Lalor's reckoning: "There were about 70 men possessing guns, 30 with pikes and 30 with pistols, but many had no more than one or two rounds of ammunition. Their coolness and bravery were admirable when it is considered that the odds were 3 to 1 against". Lalor's command was riddled with informants, and Rede was kept well advised of his movements, particularly through the work of government agents Henry Goodenough and Andrew Peters, who were embedded in the rebel garrison.

Initially outnumbering the government camp considerably, Lalor had already devised a strategy where "if the government forces come to attack us, we should meet them on the Gravel Pits, and if compelled, we should retreat by the heights to the old Canadian Gully, and there we shall make our final stand". On being brought to battle that day, Lalor stated: "we would have retreated, but it was then too late".

On the eve of the battle, Father Smyth issued a plea for Catholics to down their arms and attend mass the following day.

== Battle of the Eureka Stockade ==
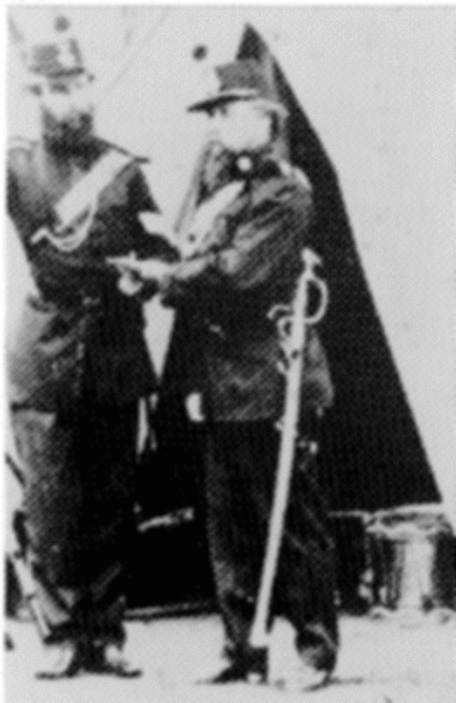
Robert Rede was the resident gold commissioner during the armed uprising in Ballarat. He is seen here as commander of the Geelong (Volunteer) Rifles Corps (right).

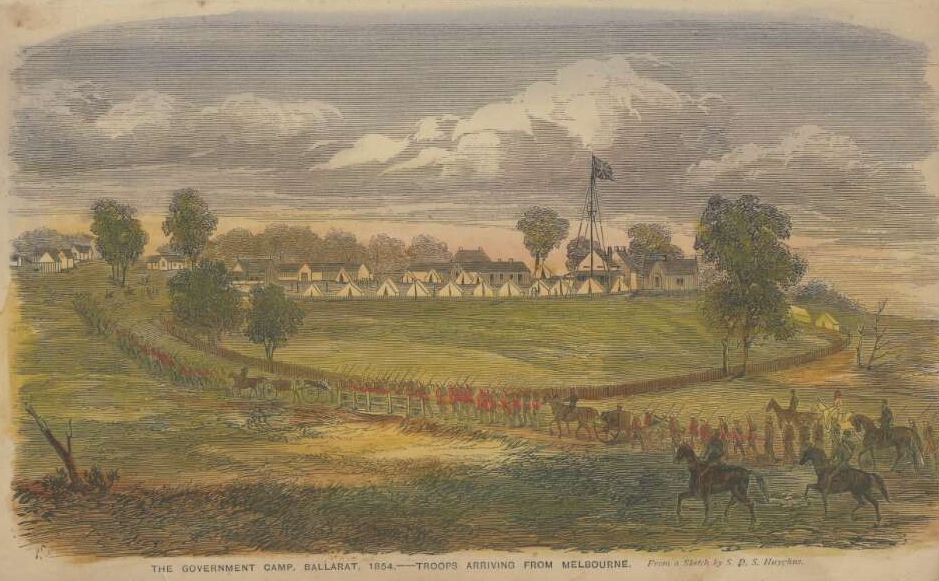
The 40th Regiment arrives in Ballarat from Melbourne.

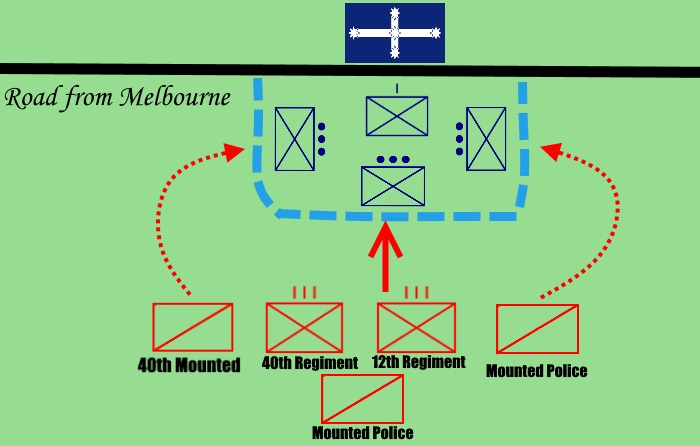
A map of the stockade and the opposing forces.

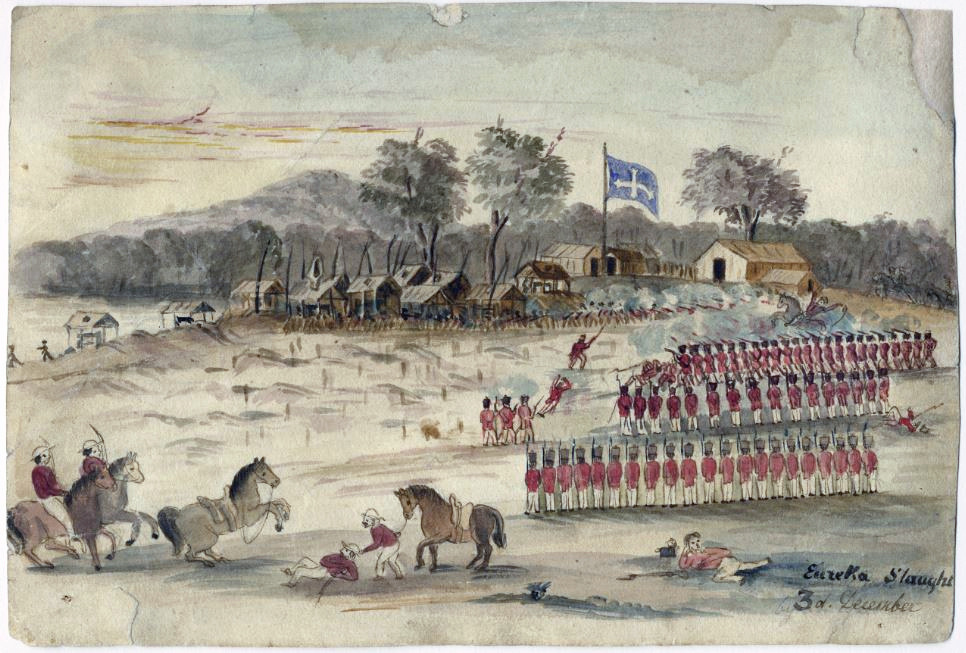
Eureka Slaughter by Charles Doudiet, 1854

Rede planned to send the combined military police formation of 276 men (Note: Foot police reinforcements arrived in Ballarat on 19 October 1854, with a further detachment of the 40th Regiment a few days behind. On 28 November, the 12th Regiment arrived to reinforce the government camp in Ballarat. By the beginning of December, the police contingent at Ballarat had been surpassed by the number of soldiers from the 12th and 40th Regiments. The strength of the various units in the government camp was: 40th Regiment (infantry): 87 men; 40th Regiment (mounted): 30 men; 12th Regiment (infantry): 65 men; mounted police: 70 men; foot police: 24 men.) under the command of Captain John Thomas to attack the Eureka Stockade when the rebel garrison was observed to be at a low watermark. The police and military had the element of surprise, timing their assault on the stockade for dawn on Sunday, the Christian Sabbath day of rest. The soldiers and police marched off in silence at around 3:30 am Sunday morning after the troopers had drunk the traditional tot of rum. The British commander used bugle calls to coordinate his forces. The 40th Regiment was to provide covering fire from one end, with mounted police covering the flanks. Enemy contact began at approximately 150 yards as the two columns of regular infantry and the contingent of foot police moved into position.

According to Gregory Blake, the fighting in Ballarat on 3 December 1854 was not one-sided and full of indiscriminate murder by the colonial forces. In his memoirs, one of Lalor's captains, John Lynch, mentions "some sharp shooting". For at least 10 minutes, the rebels offered stiff resistance, with ranged fire coming from the Eureka Stockade garrison such that Thomas's best formation, the 40th Regiment, wavered and had to be rallied. Blake says this is "stark evidence of the effectiveness of the defender's fire".

=== Contradictory accounts as to which side fired the first shot ===
Despite Lalor's insistence that his standing orders to all but the riflemen were to engage at a distance of fifteen feet and that "the military fired the first volley", it appears as if the first shots came from the Eureka Stockade garrison.

It has been claimed that Harry de Longville, who was on picket duty when the early morning shootout started, fired the first shot that was possibly intended to be a warning that the government forces were approaching. John O'Neill, serving with the 40th Regiment, later recalled:

The party had not advanced three hundred yards before we were seen by a rebel sentry, who fired, not at our party, but to warn his party in the Stockade. He was on Black Hill. Captain Thomas turned his head in the direction of the shot and said, "We are seen. Forward, and steady men! Don't fire; let the insurgents fire first. You must wait for the sound of the bugle".

A magistrate by the name of Charles Hackett said to have been generally well-liked by the miners in Ballarat, had accompanied Captain Thomas in the hopes of being able to read the riot act to the rebels; however, he had no time before the commencement of hostilities. He later gave sworn testimony that: "No shots were fired by the military or the police previous to shots being fired from the stockade".

Withers mentions an American rebel who claimed that:

The Fortieth regiment was advancing, but had not as yet discharged a shot. We could now see plainly the officer and hear his orders, when one of our men, Captain Burnette, stepped a little in front, elevated his rifle, took aim and fired. The officer fell. Captain Wise was his name. This was the first shot in the Ballarat war. It was said by many that the soldiers fired the first shot, but that is not true, as is well known to many.

Withers also published an account of one of Lalor's captains who stated: "The first shot was fired from our party, and the military answered by a volley at 100 paces distance".

Lynch recalled the course of the battle, saying:

A shot from our encampment was taken for a declaration of war, and instantaneously answered by a fusilade of musketry ... The advance of the infantry was arrested for a moment; our left was being unprotected, the troopers seized the advantage, wheeled round, and took us in the rear. We were then placed between two fires, and further resistance was useless.

In the area where the first contact was made, Carboni mentions:

Here a lad was really courageous with his bugle. He took up boldly his stand to the left of the gully and in front: the red-coats 'fell in' in their ranks to the right of this lad. The wounded on the ground behind must have numbered a dozen.

=== Eureka Stockade garrison routed ===
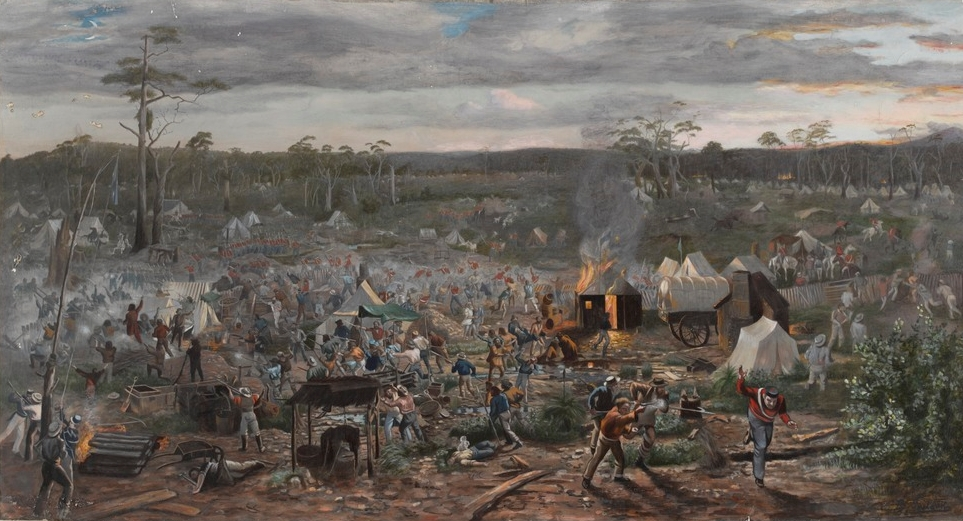
Eureka Stockade by Beryl Ireland (c.1890-1900). This artwork is believed to be an over-painted photographic print of a painted canvas by Izett Watson and Thaddeus Welch exhibited as part of a cyclorama in Fitzroy around 1891.

The rebels eventually ran short of ammunition, and the government forces resumed their advance. The Victorian police contingent led the way over the top as the forlorn hope in a bayonet charge. Carboni says it was the pikemen who stood their ground that suffered the heaviest casualties, with Lalor ordering the musketeers to take refuge in the mine holes and crying out, "Pikemen, advance! Now for God's sake do your duty". There were twenty to thirty Californians at the stockade during the battle. After the rebel garrison had already begun to flee and all hope was lost a number of them gamely joined in the final melee bearing their trademark colt revolvers.

At the height of the battle, Lalor's left arm was shattered by a bullet which later required amputation. He was hidden under some slabs before being secreted out of Ballarat to hide as an outlaw with supporters. Golden Point local Dr Timothy Doyle performed the operation with Lalor quoted as saying, "Courage, courage, take it off!". It was Doyle who, in May 1853, exclaimed, "Eureka!" as he found the first nuggets of gold near where the stockade was located by which the locality became known.

Most of the killings happened after resistance by the rebels had slackened. The government forces destroyed tents and belongings without justification, bayoneting the wounded and targeting non-combatants. The Commission of Inquiry would later find that:

The foot police appear, as a body, to have conducted themselves with creditable temper; but assuredly, on the part of the mounted division of that force there seems to have been a needless as well as ruthless sacrifice of human life, indiscriminate of innocent or guilty, and after all resistance had disappeared with the dispersed and fleeing rioters.

Stories tell how women ran forward and threw themselves over the injured to prevent further indiscriminate killing. The second in command, Captain Pasley, threatened to shoot anyone involved in murdering prisoners. His valuable assistance was acknowledged in dispatches printed and laid before the Victorian Legislative Council. Captain Thomas finally ordered the bugler to sound the retreat, with around 120 rebels, some wounded, being rounded up and marched back to the government camp two kilometres away as prisoners. They were kept there in an overcrowded lock-up before being moved to a more spacious barn on Monday morning.

The Geelong Advertiser, 6 December 1854 edition, reported that:

They all lay in a small space, with their faces upwards, looking like lead; several of them were still heaving, and at every rise of their breasts, the blood spouted out of their wounds, or just bubbled out and trickled away. One man, a stout-chested fine fellow ... had three contusions in the head, three strokes across the brow, a bayonet wound in the throat ... and other wounds - I counted fifteen in that single carcase. Some were bringing handkerchiefs, others bed furniture and matting to cover up the faces of the dead. O God! sir, it was a sight for a Sabbath morn that, I humbly implore Heaven, may never be seen again. Poor women crying for absent husbands, and children frightened into quietness ... Some of the bodies might have been removed - I counted fifteen.

Carboni recalls the casualties being piled onto horse carts with the rebel dead destined for a mass grave. (Note: Some of the fallen Eureka rebels were buried in a small bush cemetery located near where the Eureka lead intersected what is now Eureka Street. It was reported on 2 December 1857 that the bodies of Henry Ross, James Brown, Edward Thonen, and "Tom the Blacksmith" had been re-interred with the other Eureka rebels at the Ballarat Old Cemetery.)

=== Eureka Flag seized by Constable John King ===
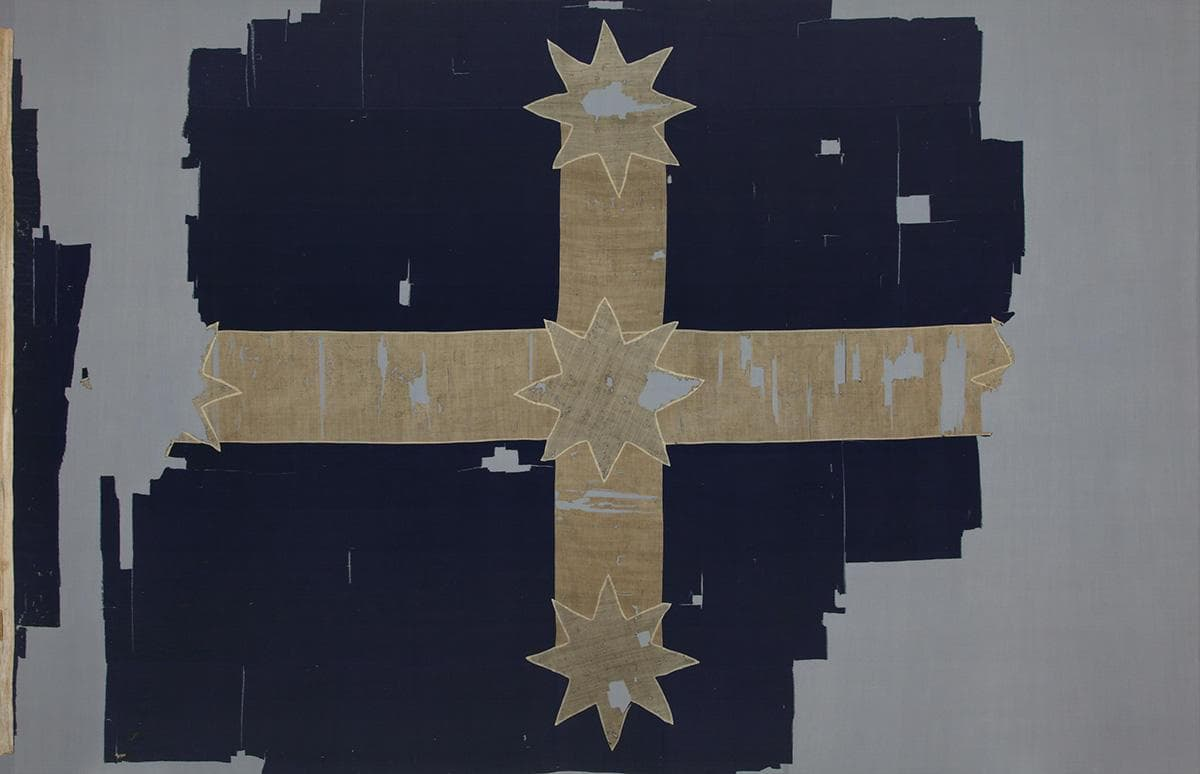
The Eureka Flag fragments donated by the King family to the Art Gallery of Ballarat.

Called as a witness in the high treason trials of the Eureka rebels, George Webster, the chief assistant civil commissary and magistrate, testified that upon entering the stockade, the besieging forces "immediately made towards the flag, and the police pulled down the flag". Constable John King volunteered to take the Eureka Flag into police custody while the battle was still raging. The report of Captain John Thomas dated 14 December 1854 mentioned: "the fact of the Flag belonging to the Insurgents (which had been nailed to the flagstaff) being captured by Constable King of the Force". W. Bourke, a miner who lived about 250 yards from the Eureka Stockade, recalled that: "The police negotiated the wall of the Stockade on the south-west, and I then saw a policeman climb the flag-pole. When up about 12 or 14 feet the pole broke, and he came down with a run".

Carboni records the Eureka Flag was then trailed in an age-old celebration of victory, saying:

A wild 'hurrah!' burst out and 'the Southern Cross' was torn down, I should say, among their laughter, such as if it had been a prize from a May-pole ... The red-coats were now ordered to 'fall in;' their bloody work was over, and were marched off, dragging with them the 'Southern Cross'.

The Geelong Advertiser reported that the flag "was carried by in triumph to the Camp, waved about in the air, then pitched from one to another, thrown down and trampled on". The soldiers also danced around the flag on a pole that was "now a sadly tattered flag from which souvenir hunters had cut and torn pieces". The morning after the battle, "the policeman who captured the flag exhibited it to the curious and allowed such as so desired to tear off small portions of its ragged end to preserve as souvenirs".

=== Estimates of the death toll ===
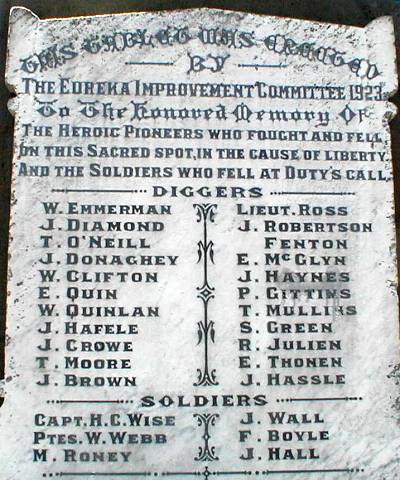
Battle of the Eureka Stockade honour roll.

The exact numbers of deaths and injuries cannot be determined as, according to researcher Dorothy Wickham, many miners "fled to the surrounding bush, and it is likely a good many more died a lonely death or suffered the agony of their wounds, hidden from the authorities for fear of repercussions".

It has been thought that all the deaths at Eureka were men. However, the diary of Charles Evans describes a funeral cortege for a woman who was mercilessly butchered by a mounted trooper while pleading for the life of her husband during the battle. Her name and the fate and identity of her husband remain unknown.

There are no recorded casualties among the Victorian police officers who took part in the battle.

==== Victorian death register ====
On 20 June 1855, the registrar of Ballarat, William Thomas Pooley, entered 27 consecutive names into the Victorian death register. There are at least three dead buried outside of Ballarat. In total, it has been discovered that there are at least ten other individuals not found on the register but referred to elsewhere as having died.

==== Captain John Thomas' list ====
Thomas' interim casualty report for the 12th and 40th Regiments dated 3 December 1854 lists one killed in action, two died of wounds, and fourteen wounded. The Eureka Improvement Committee's 1923 honour roll contains the names of six soldiers. They are Captain Wise (DOW) along with Privates Webb (DOW), Roney (KIA), Wall (DOW), Boyle (DOW), and Hall (DOW). In addition, Private Denis Brian was killed in action on 3 December 1854, and Private James Hammond died of wounds after the battle en route to Geelong.

There is also the case of Captain George Richard Littlehales, who, according to the 12th Regiment's muster list, "Died 12 February 1855 at Ballarat Camp". He was buried in the same enclosure as Privates Webb and Boyle, who died of wounds sustained in the battle. Littlehales' grave initially had a wooden monument. It was replaced by a headstone in the 1880s when the soldiers' memorial was erected. In Christ Church Cathedral, Ballarat, a large font bears the inscriptions "by his loving parents" and "in memory of G.R. Littlehales". At the Winchester Cathedral in England, two flagstones are dedicated to the Littlehales family members on the floor. The inscription on the stone dedicated to Captain Littlehales confirms that he "died in Camp at Ballarat and was there buried" at the age of 31. Blake estimates that the total military casualties are more likely to have been around 30 as those suffering from slight injuries were unreported.

==== Colonel Edward Macarthur's list ====
Deputy Adjutant-General Edward Macarthur's list of British army dead and wounded appeared in the major newspapers in December 1854.

12th Regiment

- Lieutenant William H. Paul, severely wounded
- Private William Webb, mortally ditto, since dead
- Private Robert Adair, severely wounded
- Private John Smith, severely ditto
- Private Felix Boyle, severely ditto
- Private William Buttwill, very severely ditto
- Private Timothy Galvin, severely ditto
- Private William French, severely ditto

40th Regiment

- Private Michael Rooney, killed
- Captain H. C. Wise, dangerously wounded
- Private John Bryan, severely ditto
- Private Henry Cottes, slightly wounded
- Private William Juniper, severely ditto
- Private Bernard O'Donnell, severely ditto
- Private Joseph Wall, mortally, since dead
- Private Patrick Sullivan, slightly wounded

==== Peter Lalor's list ====
Lalor listed fourteen miners (mostly Irish) as having died at the stockade and another eight who died later from injuries they sustained. A further dozen were wounded but recovered. Published by several newspapers three months after the battle, his letter to the colonists of Victoria states that:

As the inhuman brutalities practised by the troops are so well known, it is unnecessary for me to repeat them. There were 34 digger casualties of which 22 died. The unusual proportion of the killed to the wounded, is owing to the butchery of the military and troopers after the surrender.

In the Geelong Advertiser, 8 December edition, readers were told that casualties from the battle were "more numerous than originally supposed". In 1892, the Peter Lalor statue in Ballarat was inscribed with the names of the dead and wounded taken from his open letter along with the words "and others who were killed". Blake makes the unsourced claim that there were at least 21 unidentified dead buried. Superintendent Henry Foster said that "many persons killed whose names were not known, I buried five myself whose names were not known".

===== Other estimates of rebel casualties =====
Captain Thomas estimated that thirty diggers died on the spot, and "many more died of their wounds subsequently". Dan Calwell told his US relations thirty had died. Huyghue reckoned that the battle had claimed thirty to forty lives. On 6 December, Thomas Pierson noted in his diary that twenty-five had been killed and later scrawled in the margin, "time has proved that near 60 have died of the diggers in all". Reverend Taylor initially estimated 100 deaths but reconsidered writing:

About 50 came at death by their folly. On the other side two soldiers killed and two officers wounded. The sight in the morning was truly appalling – Men lying dead slain by evil. The remedy is very lamentable but it appears it was necessary. It is hoped now rebellion will be checked.

=== Last known survivor ===
The last known survivor of the battle is believed to be William Edward Atherdon (1838–1936). John Lishman Potter claimed that he was the last, which nobody questioned during his lifetime. However, later research has shown that Potter was aboard the Falcon en route to Melbourne from Liverpool on the day of the battle.

=== Weapons of the Eureka Rebellion ===
A variety of weapons were used at the Battle of the Eureka Stockade. The assorted handguns and long arms include Colt revolvers, horse pistols, pepperbox revolvers, percussion pistols, American carbines, muzzle-loading carbines, rifles, shotguns, and the Lovell 1842 pattern smooth bore muzzle-loading musket used by the government forces. In terms of edged and bladed weapons, there were Bowie knives, Mexican knives, swords and pikes.

John King's firearm that he carried into battle is still under preservation. During the 1876 Ballaarat Mechanics' Institute Fine Arts Exhibition, Mrs Bath put a pike on display that was apparently used at the Eureka Stockade, which she claims to have found the morning after the battle.

=== Location of the Eureka Stockade ===
As the materials used by the rebels to fortify the Eureka lead were quickly removed and the landscape subsequently altered by mining, the exact location of the Eureka Stockade is unknown. Various studies have been undertaken that have arrived at different conclusions. Jack Harvey (1994) has conducted an exhaustive survey and has concluded that the Eureka Stockade Memorial is situated within the confines of the historical Eureka Stockade.

== See also ==
- Eureka Flag
- Eureka Jack Mystery
- Battle of the Alamo

Lists:

- List of Eureka Stockade defenders

Australian rebellions:

- Castle Hill convict rebellion
- Darwin Rebellion
- Rum Rebellion

== Bibliography ==
- Anderson, Hugh, ed. (1978). Report from the Commission Appointed to Inquire into the Condition of the Goldfields. Melbourne: Red Rooster Press. ISBN 0-9596490-1-8.
- Appleton, Richard, ed. (1983). Australian Encyclopaedia Volume Four ELE-GIB (4th ed.). Sydney: Grolier Society. ISBN 978-0-95-966042-5.
- Australian Dictionary of Biography Vol 5: 1851-1890, K-Q. Carlton: Melbourne University Press. 1974. ISBN 978-0-52-284061-2.
- Barnard, Marjorie (1962). A History of Australia. Sydney: Angus and Robertson.
- Beggs-Sunter, Anne (2004). "Contesting the Flag: the mixed messages of the Eureka Flag". In Mayne, Alan (ed.). Eureka: reappraising an Australian Legend. Paper originally presented at Eureka Seminar, University of Melbourne History Department, 1 December 2004. Perth, Australia: Network Books. ISBN 978-1-92-084536-0.
- Blake, Gregory (2009). To Pierce the Tyrant's Heart: The Battle for the Eureka Stockade. Loftus, ACT: Australian Army History Unit. ISBN 978-0-98-047532-6.
- Blake, Gregory (2012). Eureka Stockade: A ferocious and bloody battle. Newport: Big Sky Publishing. ISBN 978-1-92-213204-8.
- Blake, Les (1979). Peter Lalor: the man from Eureka. Belmont: Neptune Press. ISBN 978-0-90-913140-1.
- Carboni, Raffaello (1855). The Eureka Stockade: The Consequence of Some Pirates Wanting a Quarterdeck Rebellion. Melbourne: J. P. Atkinson and Co. – via Project Gutenberg.
- Clark, Manning (1987). A History of Australia. Vol. IV: The Earth Abideth Forever 1851-1888. Carlton: Melbourne University Press. ISBN 9780522841473.
- Corfield, Justin; Wickham, Dorothy; Gervasoni, Clare (2004). The Eureka Encyclopedia. Ballarat: Ballarat Heritage Services. ISBN 978-1-87-647861-2.
- Craig, William (1903). My Adventures on the Australian Goldfields. London: Cassell and Company.
- Currey, C.H. (1954). The Irish at Eureka. Sydney: Angus and Robertson.
- Ferguson, Charles (1979). The Experiences of a Forty-Niner in Australia and New Zealand. Melbourne: Gaston Renard. ISBN 978-0-95-998994-6.
- FitzSimons, Peter (2012). Eureka: The Unfinished Revolution. Sydney: Random House Australia. ISBN 978-1-74-275525-0.
- Harvey, Jack (1994). Eureka Rediscovered: In search of the site of the historic stockade. Ballarat: University of Ballarat. ISBN 978-0-90-802664-7.
- "The Defence of the Eureka Stockade". Look and Learn. London: Fleetway Publications Ltd. 14 February 1970.
- Hotham, Charles (1978). Three Despatches From Sir Charles Hotham. Melbourne: Public Record Office. ISBN 978-0-72-411706-2.
- Lynch, John (1940). Story of the Eureka Stockade: Epic Days of the Early Fifties at Ballarat (Reprint ed.). Melbourne: Australian Catholic Truth Society.
- MacFarlane, Ian (1995). Eureka from the Official Records. Melbourne: Public Record Office Victoria. ISBN 978-0-73-066011-8.
- Smith, F. B., ed. (1965). Historical Studies: Eureka Supplement (2nd ed.). Melbourne: Melbourne University Press.
- Smith, Whitney (1975). Flags Through the Ages and Across the World. Maidenhead: McGraw-Hill. ISBN 978-0-07-059093-9.
- Wenban, Ray (1958). The Revolt at Eureka. Pictorial Social Studies. Vol. 16. Sydney: Australian Visual Education.
- Wickham, Dorothy; Gervasoni, Clare (1998). Eureka Reminiscences. Ballarat: Ballarat Heritage Service. ISBN 0-646-35238-5.
- Withers, William (1999). History of Ballarat and Some Ballarat Reminiscences. Ballarat: Ballarat Heritage Service. ISBN 978-1-87-647878-0.
- Wright, Clare (2013). The Forgotten Rebels of Eureka. Melbourne: Text Publishing. ISBN 978-1-92214-737-0.
