= William Edward Atherden =

English sailor

William Edward Atherden (c.1838-14 May 1934) was the last survivor of the Battle of the Eureka Stockade. He was originally from Dover in Kent, England. At the age of 15, he sailed to Melbourne, and along with other sailors, deserted to head for the Victorian gold fields, walking some of the journey with bare feet. After the fall of the Eureka Stockade, Atherden was one of 114 men taken prisoner. After he was released, Atherden went back to prospecting and made a small fortune. Returning to England in 1856 he was married to Mary Martin the following year and had six children. Atherden returned to Australia with his family, buying an orchard in York, Western Australia. He was present in Ballarat for the 50th anniversary commemorations of the battle in 1904. Atherden retired to Osborne Park in Perth, where he died on 14 May 1934. He is buried in Karrakatta Cemetery.

== See also ==
- Battle of the Eureka Stockade
- List of Eureka Stockade defenders

== Bibliography ==
- Corfield, Justin; Wickham, Dorothy; Gervasoni, Clare (2004). The Eureka Encyclopedia. Ballarat: Ballarat Heritage Services. ISBN 978-1-87-647861-2.
