= Eureka Jack Mystery =

Debate over flag arrangements at the Eureka Stockade

The Eureka Jack Mystery relates to the reported flying of two rebel battle flags during the Eureka Rebellion in 1854.

Since 2009, various theories have emerged, based on the Argus account of the fall of the Eureka Stockade, and the affidavit of Private Hugh King dated four days after the battle that mentions a flag being seized from a prisoner detained at the stockade, concerning whether a Union Jack, known as the Eureka Jack was also flown along with the Eureka Flag. In a report published the day after the armed uprising in Ballarat, readers of the Argus were told that:

The flag of the diggers, "The Southern Cross," as well as the "Union Jack," which they had to hoist underneath, were captured by the foot police.

The Eureka Jack has been commemorated and investigated since the 19th century. The oath swearing ceremony in the 1949 motion picture Eureka Stockade features the star-spangled Eureka Flag with the Union Jack beneath. Ray Wenban depicted the Eureka Jack in a 1958 pictorial history series for students. In honour of the 160th anniversary of the battle in 2014, the Australian Flag Society released "Fall Back with the Eureka Jack", which illustrates Gregory Blake's two-flag theory in folk art.

== Erroneous reporting theory ==
Extract of Argus report, 4 December 1854

In his Eureka: The Unfinished Revolution, Peter FitzSimons has stated:

In my opinion, this report of the Union Jack being on the same flagpole as the flag of the Southern Cross is not credible. There is no independent corroborating report in any other newspaper, letter, diary or book, and one would have expected Raffaello Carboni, for one, to have mentioned it had that been the case. The paintings of the flag ceremony and battle by Charles Doudiet, who was in Ballarat at the time, depicts no Union Jack. During the trial for high treason, the flying of the Southern Cross was an enormous issue, yet no mention was ever made of the Union Jack flying beneath.

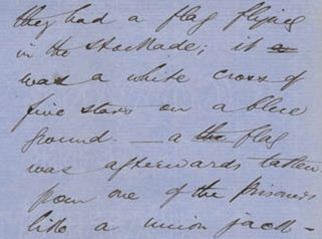
Extract of the affidavit by Hugh King, 7 December 1854

However, Hugh King, who was a private in the 40th (the 2nd Somersetshire) Regiment of Foot, swore in a signed contemporaneous affidavit that he recalled:

... three or four hundred yards a heavy fire from the stockade was opened on the troops and me. When the fire was opened on us we received orders to fire. I saw some of the 40th wounded lying on the ground but I cannot say that it was before the fire on both sides. I think some of the men in the stockade should – they had a flag flying in the stockade; it was a white cross of five stars on a blue ground. – flag was afterwards taken from one of the prisoners like a union jack – we fired and advanced on the stockade, when we jumped over, we were ordered to take all we could prisoners ...

During the committal hearings for the Eureka rebels, there would be another Argus report dated 9 December 1854 concerning the seizure of a second flag at the stockade in the following terms:

The great topic of interest to-day has been the proceedings in reference to the state prisoners now confined in the Camp. As the evidence of the witnesses in these cases is more reliable information than that afforded by most reports, I shall endeavor to give you an abstract of it.

Hugh King was called upon to give further testimony live under oath in the matter of Timothy Hayes. In doing so went into more detail than in his written affidavit, as the report states that the flag like a Union Jack was found:

... rollen up in the breast of a[n] [unidentified] prisoner. He [King] advanced with the rest, firing as they advanced ... several shots were fired on them after they entered [the stockade]. He observed the prisoner [Hayes] brought down from a tent in custody.

== Chartist liberty symbol theory ==
Military historian and author of Eureka Stockade: A Ferocious and Bloody Battle, Gregory Blake, conceded that the rebels may have flown two battle flags as they claimed to be defending their British rights. (Note: The charter of the Ballarat Reform League was inspired by that adopted by the 1839 Chartist National Convention held in London. According to an eminent authority on vexillology, Whitney Smith, it was around this time the Union Jack became a true national flag while being "inscribed with slogans as a protest flag of the Chartist movement in the nineteenth century".) Blake leaves open the possibility that the flag being carried by the prisoner had been souvenired from the flag pole as the routed garrison was fleeing the stockade. Once taken by Constable John King, the Eureka Flag was placed beneath his tunic in the same fashion as the suspected Union Jack was found on the prisoner. In 1896, Sergeant John McNeil, who was at the battle, recalled shredding a flag at the Spencer Street Barracks in Melbourne at the time. He claimed it was the Eureka Flag that he had torn down; however, Blake believes it may have been the mystery Eureka Jack.

== Divided loyalties theory ==
Another theory is that the Eureka Jack was an 11th-hour response to divided loyalties in the rebel camp. Peter Lalor made a blunder by choosing "Vinegar Hill" – the site of a battle during the Irish uprising of 1798 – as the rebel password. This led to waning support for the Eureka Rebellion as news that the issue of Irish independence had become involved began to circulate.

The memoirs of Eureka rebel William Craig, who accompanied Lalor on the voyage to Australia, mention that:

the collapse of the rising in Ballarat may be regarded as mainly attributable to the password given by Lalor on the night before the assault. Asked by one of the subordinate leaders of the revolt for the "night pass", he gave "Vinegar Hill" ... Many at Ballarat, who were disposed before to resist the military, now quietly withdrew from the movement. They concluded that Lalor’s object was more to strike a blow for Ireland than at official despotism. So instead of their being, as in the morning, some 700 men inside the defences, there were barely 230 at the time of the attack. Bendigo, Forrest Creek, and Creswick contributed contingents to assist the struggle. From the latter place alone a thousand men were on the march to Ballarat; but when the news circulated that Irish independence had crept into the movement, almost all turned back. (Note: Peter FitzSimons points out that although the number of reinforcements converging on Ballarat was probably closer to 500, there is no doubt that as a result of the choice of password "the Stockade is denied many strong-armed men because of the feeling that the Irish have taken over".)

John Lynch, who was also at the Eureka Stockade as one of Lalor's captains, recalled the dire circumstances facing the ill-fated rebel garrison in the hours leading up to the battle, saying:

On the afternoon of Saturday, we had a force of seven hundred men on whom we thought we could rely. We had no idea of the exact time when the encounter would take place, but we were not surprised to learn that it was imminent. During the night an alarm was given that the soldiers were coming; but it proved false. At the "falling in" we noticed a large defection: there had been numerous desertions. This ought to have been seriously considered, but it was not.

Ballarat local historian W.B. Withers states:

Lalor, it is said, gave 'Vinegar Hill' as the night's pass-word, but neither he nor his adherents expected that the fatal action of Sunday was coming, and some of his followers, incited by the sinister omen of the pass-word, abandoned that night what they saw was a badly organised and not very hopeful movement.

== Art Gallery of Ballarat ==
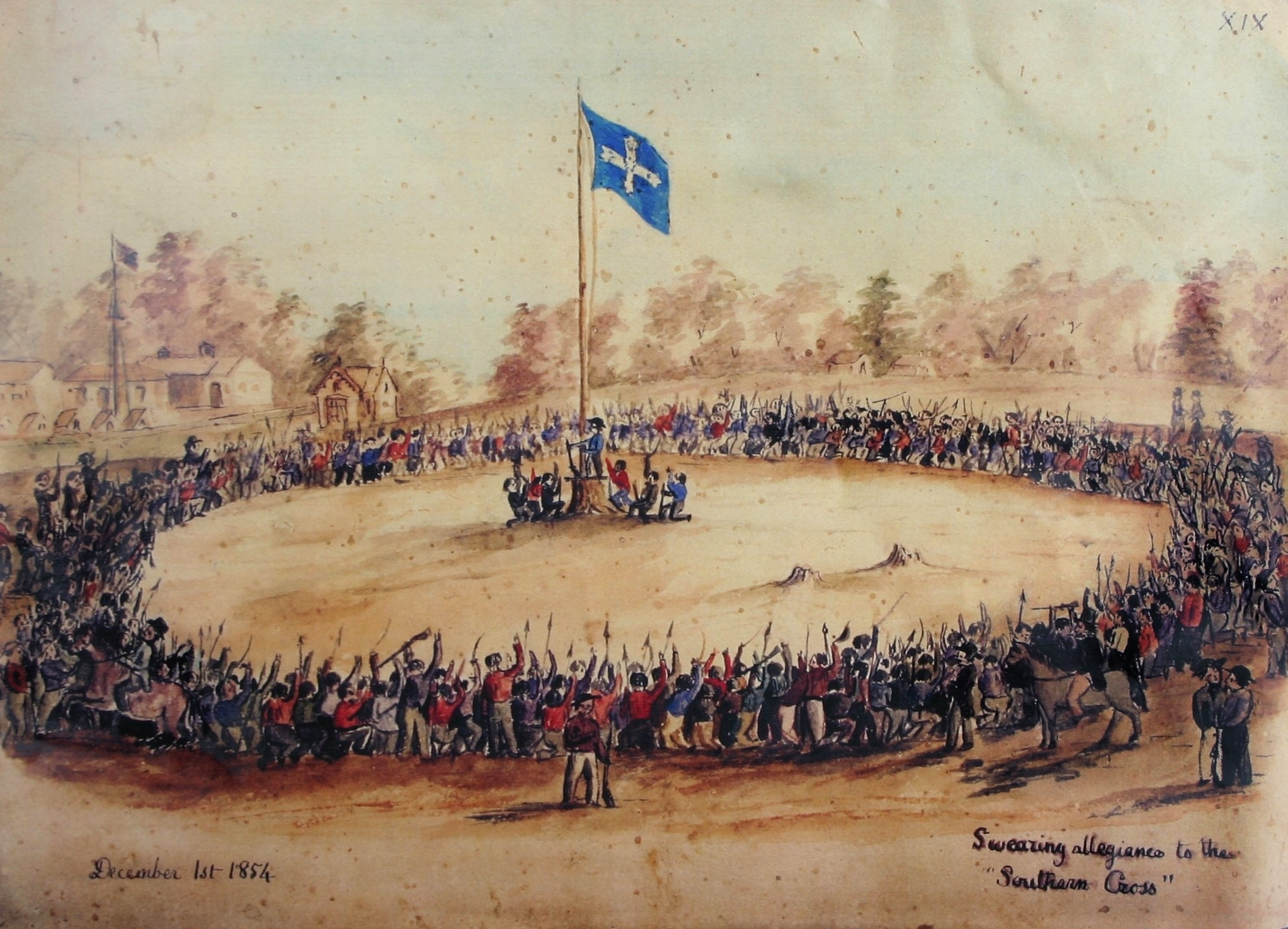
Swearing Allegiance to the Southern Cross by Charles Doudiet (1854)

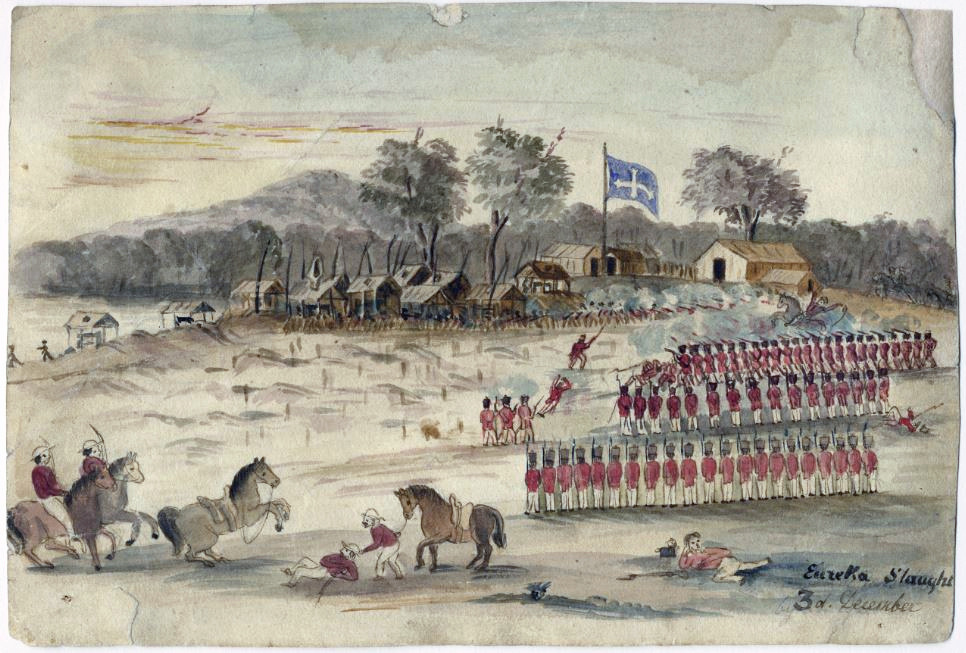
Eureka Slaughter by Charles Doudiet (1854)

According to Gordon Morrison, director of the Art Gallery of Ballarat, in a letter to the editor published in the Ballarat Courier on the subject of the search for the Eureka Jack:

I READ with interest the article about a search for a Union Flag which some say was flown below the Eureka Flag at the stockade.

The Art Gallery of Ballarat holds drawings in its collection which are believed to be the only contemporary images of the Eureka flag, then usually referred to as the Southern Cross flag or Starry banner, made by an eyewitness to the events at Bakery Hill and the stockade on the November, 29 and December, 3, 1854.

These watercolours by the Swiss-born digger Charles-Alphonse Doudiet, show the Southern Cross flag at these two events, but give no indication that there was a Union flag flown as well.

We do not know exactly when Doudiet made his sketches but the existing evidence suggests that he was present at both events and that he made these drawings shortly after they took place.

In any court of enquiry these drawings would have to take precedence over "early newspaper reports" and most especially over a cartoon from a book published in the 1950s.

The original flag of the Southern Cross (Eureka flag) is currently on loan to the Museum of Australian Democracy at Eureka (M.A.D.E), but from a curatorial perspective the Art Gallery of Ballarat still has a profound interest in the image-making related to these momentous events.

We have recently purchased Sidney Nolan's 1949 portrait on glass of John Joseph, the black American who was one of 13 diggers arraigned on treason charges after the storming of the stockade.

Joseph was the first to be brought before the magistrate and his acquittal by the jury gave the signal that none of the men would be convicted.

The gallery has held Nolan's drawings of the leading figures associated with Eureka since 2003 and we are delighted to have secured an example of the final painted versions as well.

Both drawing and painting are currently on display in the gallery.

== Post 19th century investigations and commemorations ==
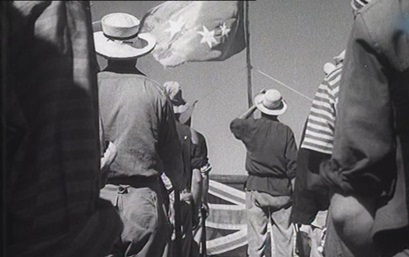
Oath swearing scene from the 1949 motion picture Eureka Stockade featuring the star-spangled Eureka flag

It is unknown whether William Withers, who investigated the fate of the Eureka Flag for his 1870 local history of Ballarat, made any enquiries concerning the Eureka Jack. He later published his findings in an article entitled "The Eureka Stockade Flag" in the Ballarat Star, 1 May 1896 edition. Withers includes the relevant extract from the Argus account that mentions two battle flags having been seized, yet he otherwise makes no further reference to the Eureka Jack.

The oath swearing ceremony in the 1949 motion picture Eureka Stockade features the star-spangled Eureka Flag with the Union Jack beneath. In The Revolt at Eureka, part of a 1958 illustrated history series for students, the artist Ray Wenban would remain faithful to the first reports of the battle with his rendition featuring two flags flying above the Eureka Stockade.

In 2013, the Australian Flag Society announced a worldwide quest and a $10,000 reward for more information and materials relating to the Eureka Jack Mystery. The AFS also released a commemorative artwork Fall Back with the Eureka Jack for the 160th anniversary of the battle in 2014.

== See also ==
- Australian Flag Society
- Eureka Flag
- The Flag on Prospect Hill debate over the flag flown by George Washington in 1776

== Bibliography ==
=== Historiography ===
- Blake, Gregory (2012). Eureka Stockade: A ferocious and bloody battle. Newport: Big Sky Publishing. ISBN 978-1-92-213204-8.
- Blake, Gregory (2009). To Pierce the Tyrant's Heart: The Battle for the Eureka Stockade. Loftus, ACT: Australian Army History Unit. ISBN 978-0-98-047532-6.
- FitzSimons, Peter (2012). Eureka: The Unfinished Revolution. Sydney: Random House Australia. ISBN 978-1-74-275525-0.
- Wenban, Ray (1958). The Revolt at Eureka. Pictorial Social Studies. Vol. 16. Sydney: Australian Visual Education.
- Withers, William (1999). History of Ballarat and Some Ballarat Reminiscences. Ballarat: Ballarat Heritage Service. ISBN 978-1-87-647878-0.

=== Vexillology ===
- Smith, Whitney (1975). Flags Through the Ages and Across the World. Maidenhead: McGraw-Hill. ISBN 978-0-07-059093-9.

=== Primary sources ===
==== Memoirs ====
- Craig, William (1903). My Adventures on the Australian Goldfields. London: Cassell and Company.
- Lynch, John (1940). Story of the Eureka Stockade: Epic Days of the Early Fifties at Ballarat (Reprint ed.). Melbourne: Australian Catholic Truth Society.
- MacFarlane, Ian (1995). Eureka from the Official Records. Melbourne: Public Record Office Victoria. ISBN 978-0-73-066011-8.
- Nicholls, H.R (May 1890). Reminiscences of the Eureka Stockade. The Centennial Magazine: An Australian Monthly. II: August 1889 to July 1890 (available in an annual compilation).

=== Newspaper reports ===
- "By Express. Fatal Collision at Ballaarat". The Argus. Melbourne. 4 December 1854. p. 5 – via Trove.
- "BALLAARAT". The Argus. Melbourne. 9 December 1854. p. 5 – via Trove.
- Cowie, Tom (22 October 2013). "$10,000 reward to track down 'other' Eureka flag". The Courier. Ballarat. p. 3.
- Henderson, Fiona (23 December 2014). "Reward offered for evidence of battle's Union Jack flag". The Courier. Ballarat. p. 5.

=== Reference books ===
- Corfield, Justin; Wickham, Dorothy; Gervasoni, Clare (2004). The Eureka Encyclopedia. Ballarat: Ballarat Heritage Services. ISBN 978-1-87-647861-2.
