= John King (police officer) =

Irish police officer (1830–1881)

- Born: 5 February 1830; Tumurah, County Down, Ireland
- Died: 23 October 1881; Warrnambool, Victoria, Australia
- Burial place: Dunmunkle Cemetery, Minyip
- Known for: Seizing the Eureka Flag

John King (1830-1881) was a police constable at the Battle of the Eureka Stockade who was responsible for seizing the rebel war flag.

== Early life ==
Born in the parish of Tumurah, County Down, Ireland, son of James King, farmer, and Jane (nee McAllister), he attempted to join the British Army several times but was rejected on account of his age. Finally on 24 November 1846, aged sixteen, he managed to enlist at Lisburn – partly by raising his age to eighteen. He served as a private in the 61st Regiment (The South Gloucestershire Regiment) for six years and 306 days – being with the Army of Punjab [sic] in India in 1848-49, being present during the ‘Passage of Cinaub’, and at the battles of Sadsolopoor, Chillianwalla and Goojerat. On 1 March 1853, he paid £18 to gain his discharge from the army and came to Australia. After trying his hand at mining, on 25 March 1854, he joined the police. His record sheet describes him as ‘age 25, height 5 feet six and a half inches, eyes grey, hair brown; complexion light’.

== Captures the Eureka Flag ==
King was at the Battle of the Eureka Stockade and was involved in seizing the Eureka Flag, volunteering for the honour whilst the battle was still raging. In his report dated 14 December 1854, Captain John Thomas mentioned "the fact of the Flag belonging to the Insurgents (which had been nailed to the flagstaff) being captured by Constable King of the Force". King had volunteered for the honour while the battle was still raging. W. Bourke, a miner residing about 250 yards from the stockade, recalled that: "The police negotiated the wall of the Stockade on the south-west, and I then saw a policeman climb the flag pole. When up about 12 or 14 feet the pole broke, and he came down with a run".

== Witness in high treason trials ==
After the fall of the Eureka Stockade, King was a witness at the subsequent 1855 Victorian high treason trials. George Webster, the chief assistant civil commissary and magistrate, testified that upon entering the stockade, the besieging forces "immediately made towards the flag, and the police pulled down the flag". King testified that, "I took their flag, the southern cross, down – the same flag as now produced".

The Eureka Flag was exhibited at the trials, and after pieces had been cut off, it was returned to King, who gained his discharge from the police on 29 March 1855.

== Later life and death ==
King initially tried mining again. However, he soon moved to Ararat, where he farmed for six years. On 16 July 1863, he married Isabella Convery, Daughter of Bernard King and Mary Ann (nee Moore) and they had seven children: Bernard James, born in 1864 at Warrnambool; Edward born in 1866 in Warrnambool (married Emily Jane Quinton in 1896); Lewis Peter Arthur, born in 1867 at Warrnambool (married Eliza Grose in 1896); Mary Ann, born in 1869 at Warrnambool (died in infancy); Albert John, born in 1872 at Lake Bolac; Amy Isabel, born in 1875 at Lake Bolac; and William Robert, born in 1878, in Minyip. In the late 1870s, he eventually settled near Minyip in the Victorian Wimmera district. It was here that the "King fragments" of the Eureka Flag "made occasional appearances at country bazaars". The family moved to Warrnambool, and John King ran an aerated water factory for nine years before he moved to Lake Bolac where he ran a mill. Moving again, this time to the Wimmera, he took up land called "Kingsley" at Nullan, near Minyip. There, they lived in their old house from Lake Bolac, which had been transported by bullock wagon – it was destroyed in a fire in 1951. John King was a member of the Minyip Shire Council and twice the President of the Shire. He died on 23 October 1881 at Warrnambool and was buried in the Dunmunkle Cemetery at Minyip. Isabella died in 1900 at Minyip.

== Legacy ==
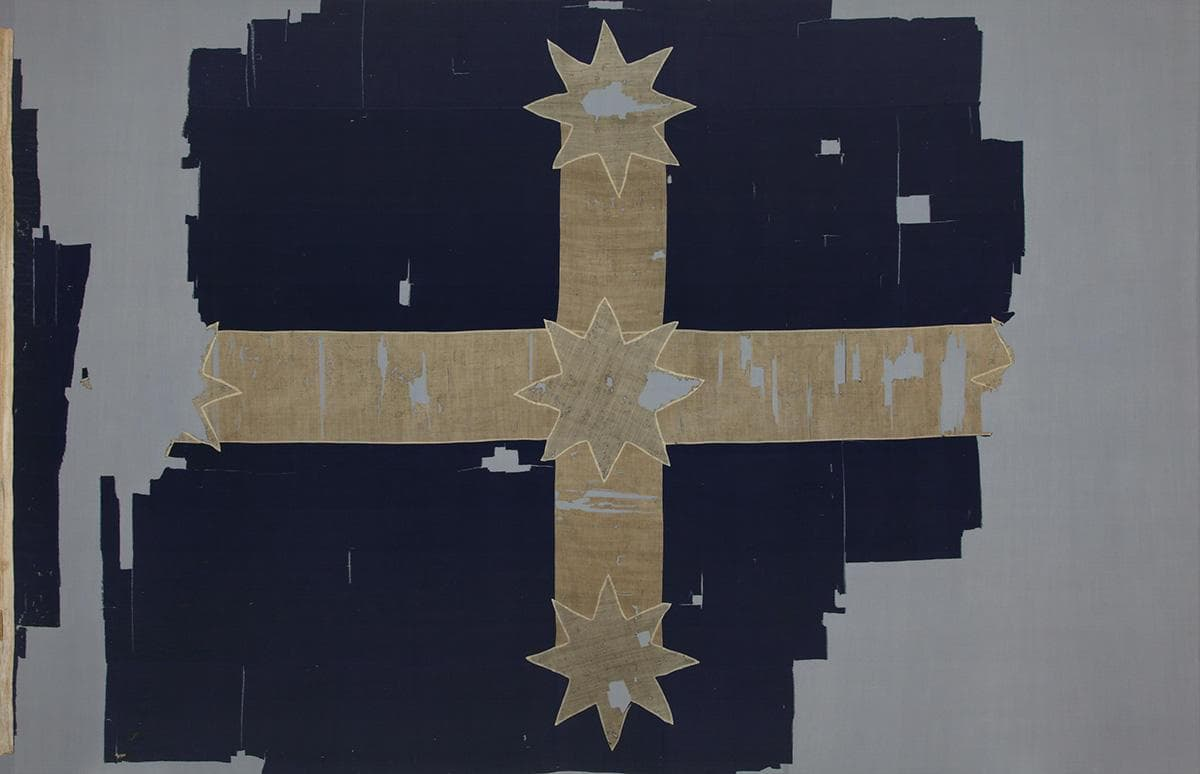
The Eureka Flag fragments donated by the family of Constable John King to the Art Gallery of Ballarat

In his 1870 history of Ballarat, William Withers said he had not been able to find out what had happened to the Eureka Flag. Professor Anne Beggs-Sunter thinks it is "likely that King read Withers's book, because he wrote to the Melbourne Public Library offering to sell the flag to that institution."

The head librarian, Marcus Clarke, approached Peter Lalor to authenticate the flag. He was unable, replying, "Can you find someone whose memory is more accurate than mine?" The library eventually decided not to acquire the flag due to the uncertainty over its origins. It would remain in the custody of the King family for forty years until 1895, when it was lent to the Ballarat Fine Art Gallery (now the Art Gallery of Ballarat). John King's widow Isabella would post the flag after being approached by art gallery president James Oddie, along with a letter to the secretary which reads:

Kingsley, Minyip,

1st October, 1895

Dear Sir, In connection with the wish of the president of the Ballarat Fine Arts and Public Gallery for the gift or loan of the flag that floated above the Eureka Stockade, I have much pleasure in offering loan of flag to the above association on condition that I may get it at any time I specify, or on demand of myself or my son, Arthur King. The main portion of the flag was torn along the rope that attached it to the staff, but there is still part of it around the rope so that I suppose it would be best to send the whole of it as it now is. You will find several holes, that were caused by bullets that were fired at my late husband in his endeavours to seize the flag at that memorable event:- Yours, &c.,

Mrs J. King (per Arthur King)

In 1967, it was proven authentic and was formally unveiled by Prime Minister Gough Whitlam on 3 December 1973. John King’s single barrel fowling piece, used at the Eureka Stockade, is on display at Ballarat’s Eureka Centre.

== Bibliography ==
- Bate, Weston (1978). Lucky City, The First Generation at Ballarat, 1851–1901. Carlton: Melbourne University Press. ISBN 978-0-52-284157-2.
- Beggs-Sunter, Anne (2004). "Contesting the Flag: the mixed messages of the Eureka Flag". In Mayne, Alan (ed.). Eureka: reappraising an Australian Legend. Paper originally presented at Eureka Seminar, University of Melbourne History Department, 1 December 2004. Perth, Australia: Network Books. ISBN 978-1-92-084536-0.
- Corfield, Justin; Wickham, Dorothy; Gervasoni, Clare (2004). The Eureka Encyclopedia. Ballarat: Ballarat Heritage Services. ISBN 978-1-87-647861-2.
- FitzSimons, Peter (2012). Eureka: The Unfinished Revolution. Sydney: Random House Australia. ISBN 978-1-74-275525-0.
- Wickham, Dorothy; Gervasoni, Clare; D'Angri, Val (2000). The Eureka Flag: Our Starry Banner. Ballarat: Ballarat Heritage Services. ISBN 978-1-87-647813-1.
- Withers, William (1999). History of Ballarat and Some Ballarat Reminiscences. Ballarat: Ballarat Heritage Service. ISBN 978-1-87-647878-0.
