= Robert Nickle (British Army officer) =

British Army officer (1786–1855)

Major-General Sir Robert Nickle KH
- Born: 12 August 1786; At sea
- Died: 26 May 1855 (aged 68) Melbourne, Colony of Victoria

Major-General Sir Robert Nickle, KH (12 August 1786 – 26 May 1855) was a commander of the forces in Australia.

Nickle was born at sea, the son of Robert Nicholl, an officer in the 17th Light Dragoons, and entered the army at an early age. He served with the Connaught Rangers in various parts of the world for upwards of twenty-two years, seeing much hard service and winning great distinction for bravery.

Nickle went to the West Indies in 1830, and was appointed Governor of St. Christopher and its dependencies. He served during the insurrection in British North America in 1838, and was knighted in 1844. In 1853 he was appointed commander of the forces in Australia, and during the Eureka Rebellion of 1854 displayed great forbearance and tact. Coming on the scene shortly after the affair of the Eureka stockade, where Captain Thomas was in command of the Queen's troops, he induced the rioters to disperse without further bloodshed. Miner and diarist Charles Evans recorded the effect of Nickle's conduct as follows:

Sir Robert Nichol [sic] has taken the reins of power at the Camp. Already there is a sensible and gratifying deference in its appearance. The old General went round unattended to several tents early this morning & made enquiries from the diggers relative to the cause of the outbreak. It is very probable from the humane & temperate course he is taking that he will establish himself in the goodwill of the people.

He was nearly seventy years of age at the time of his death, which occurred in Melbourne, Victoria, Australia on 26 May 1855.
