= Charles Evans (colonial businessman) =

English businessman and entrepreneur

Charles James Evans (1827 – 3 April 1881) was an English businessman and entrepreneur present in the colony of Victoria, Australia from the early days of the Victorian Gold Rush. His personal diary is notable as being one of the few contemporary eyewitness accounts of the Eureka Rebellion.

Charles Evans was born in Ironbridge, in the county of Shropshire, England, in 1827. In 1852, along with his brother, George, he emigrated to Victoria on the ship, Mobile.

After selling their confectionery business in Brunswick and working as timber cutters, they decided to set out for the goldfields of Ballarat where they established the Criterion Auction Mart, followed by the Criterion Printing Office. It was during this time that Evans recorded his experiences in his personal diary, including the scenes at Ballarat in the time leading up to the Eureka Rebellion, as well as its chaotic aftermath.

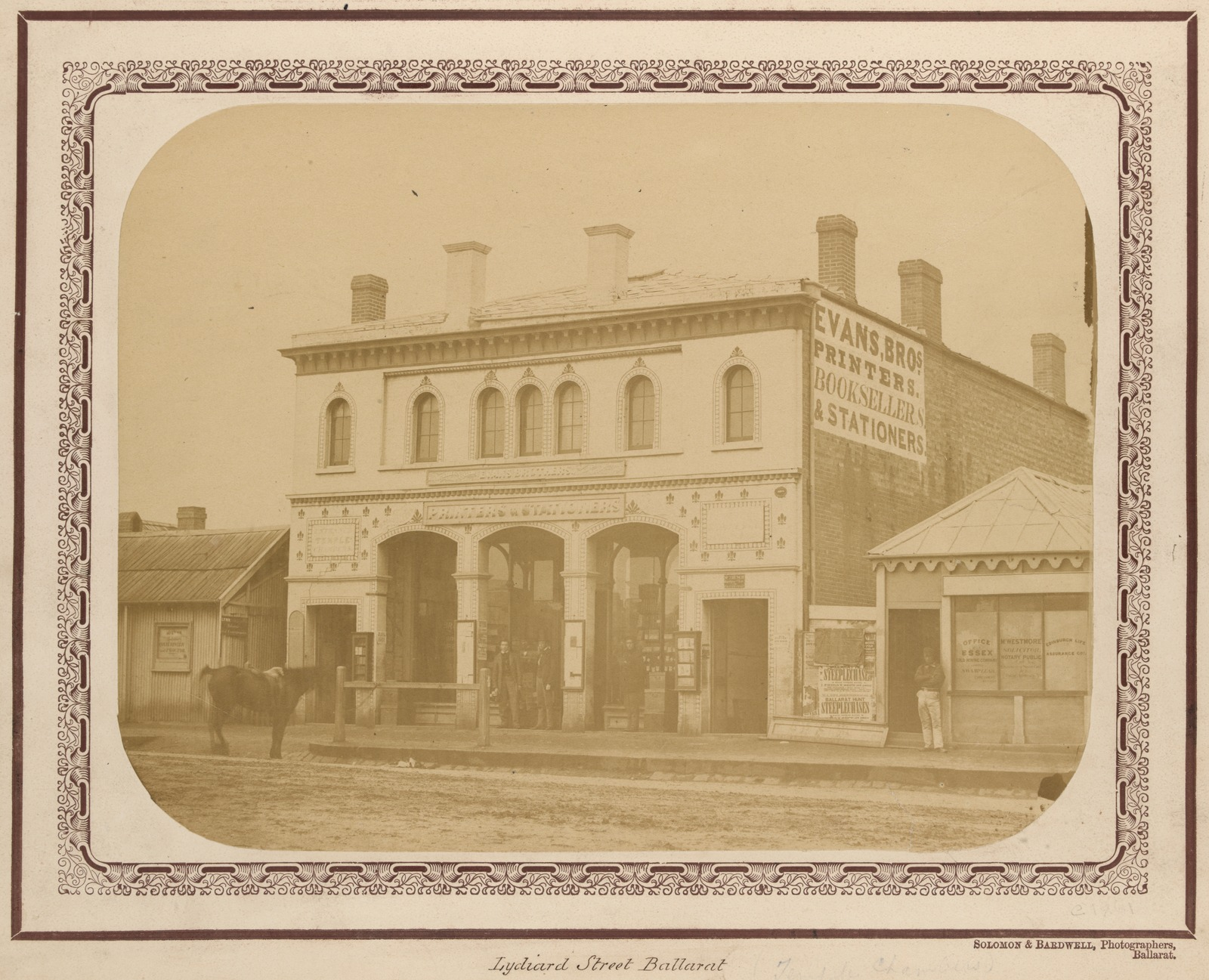
A view of Lydiard street, Ballarat, showing the Evans Bros. shop front in 1861.

In 1864 the brothers relocated to St Kilda, and, while still maintaining the printing business in Ballarat (now trading as Evans Brothers), expanded to open a second printing business in Collins st, Melbourne, which in 1874 merged with the firm of Arnall and Jackson. Charles died at age 54 on 3 April 1881 leaving behind his wife, Catherine, who only two months earlier had given birth to their eleventh child.

Charles Evans’ diary was acquired by the State Library Victoria in 2006. The diary’s contents had long been attributed to another Victorian colonist, Samuel Lazarus, until the true authorship of the diary was discovered in 2012.
