= John Lishman Potter =

John Lishman Potter (1834–1931) was an English goldminer, stonemason and builder, who emigrated to New Zealand to work. He was born in Sunderland, England in 1834.
