= John Wellesley Thomas =

British Army general

Lieutenant-General Sir John Wellesley Thomas KCB
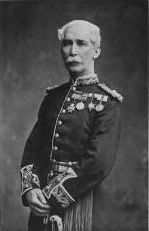
- Born: 22 May 1822; Bath, Somerset
- Died: 6 February 1908 (aged 85)
- Burial place: Kensal Green Cemetery
- Military career
- Allegiance: United Kingdom
- Branch: British Army
- Service years: 1839–1881
- Rank: Lieutenant-General
- Commands: 67th (South Hampshire) Regiment of Foot
- Conflicts: First Anglo-Afghan War; Eureka Rebellion; Second Opium War; Taiping Rebellion
- Awards: Knight Commander of the Order of the Bath; Mentioned in Despatches
- Other work: Colonel of the Hampshire Regiment (1893–1908)

Lieutenant-General Sir John Wellesley Thomas, KCB (22 May 1822 – 6 February 1908) was a distinguished British military officer who served in Afghanistan, Australia, and China. He was the commander of the British military and police forces that quelled the rebellion at the Eureka Stockade in Ballarat, Victoria, in 1854.

Thomas, who was an elder son of the Admiral Jennings Thomas, was born in 1822. He received his first commission in 1839 and served with the 40th Regiment of Foot in Afghanistan in 1841–42, during the First Anglo-Afghan War. He was present at the action of Maharajpur when he was severely wounded. His decorations for those engagements included the clasps "Kandahar, Kabul, Ghuznee" and the bronze star for Maharajpur. In 1854, he commanded detachments in the operations in Australia against rebellious miners on the Ballarat goldfields. In North China, he served with the 67th Regiment of Foot and was wounded when in command of a half-battalion attacking the North Taku Fort in 1860. For this campaign, he was mentioned in despatches and appointed a Companion of the Order of the Bath. Two years later, when being promoted to colonel, he commanded the 67th Regiment and a brigade at the second capture of Khading in the Taiping Rebellion. This was his last active service. He was promoted to major general in 1877, and retired in 1881 with the honorary rank of lieutenant general. In 1882, he was appointed to the colonelcy of the Hampshire Regiment, and in 1904 was made a Knight Commander of the Order of the Bath.

Thomas died on 8 February 1908, and was buried at Kensal Green, London.

Military offices
Preceded by Thomas Edmond Knox	Colonel of the Hampshire Regiment; 1893–1908	Succeeded by Sir Charles Benjamin Knowles
