= Eureka Stockade (1949 film) =

1949 British Australian Western film by Harry Watt

- British quad poster by John Minton
- Directed by: Harry Watt
- Written by: Harry Watt; Walter Greenwood addit. scenes Ralph Smart research Rex Rienits
- Produced by: Michael Balcon associate Leslie Norman
- Starring: Chips Rafferty; Jane Barrett; Jack Lambert; Gordon Jackson
- Cinematography: George Heath
- Edited by: Leslie Norman
- Music by: John Greenwood
- Production company: Ealing Studios
- Distributed by: General Film Distributors
- Release dates: 26 January 1949 (UK); 7 May 1949 (Australia)
- Running time: 103 minutes
- Countries: United Kingdom; Australia
- Language: English
- Budget: £200,000
- Box office: £55,855 (UK)

Eureka Stockade is a 1949 British film of the story surrounding Irish-Australian rebel and politician Peter Lalor and the gold miners' rebellion of 1854 at the Eureka Stockade in Ballarat, Victoria, in the Australian Western genre.

Starring Chips Rafferty, it was produced by Ealing Studios and directed by Harry Watt, following their success with The Overlanders. The movie was the most expensive film made in Australia at that time, and was a critical and commercial disappointment. It has been called "a case of a filmmaker coming off a big fat hit and given carte blanche for his next project, then picking a story that gave him full scope to spend a lot of money on production value, but it was beyond his capabilities to dramatise."

== Plot ==
An introductory montage establishes Australia of 1851 – a place of both wealth and poverty, transformed by the discovery of gold. This causes a massive drain in manpower which puts a strain on the country. The Governor of Victoria, La Trobe, appoints an army officer, Rede, commissioner of the goldfields and orders him to tax the miners via licences, and to keep law and order.

In 1854 Ballarat, civil engineer Peter Lalor arrives to prospect for gold with his Italian friend Rafaello Carboni. They discover the license fee system is strictly enforced. The miners are upset at the conditions under which they work. Lalor and Carboni befriend a Scottish sailor, Tom. Lalor meets a school teacher, Alicia, and the two begin a romance.

Governor La Trobe resigns and Governor Hotham arrives, ordering Rede to force people off the gold fields in order to encourage them back to other jobs. Things get militant on the goldfields after the murder of miner James Scobie by James Bentley goes unpunished. The miners riot, despite Lalor's efforts and burn down Bentley's hotel. Governor Hotham sends in the military to keep the peace.

The miners form the Ballarat Reform League and Lalor emerges as their leader. They rally under the Eureka Flag.

Lalor and the miners arm themselves and make camp at the Eureka Stockade. The rebellion is overpowered by the British Army. Many of the miners are killed and Lalor is injured, ultimately having to have his arm amputated. However the reforms wanted by the miners are ultimately pushed through and Lalor is elected to Parliament.

At the court case the authorities are over-confident of a guilty verdict against the ring-leaders – which would mean the death penalty. However, the jury find all not guilty. This paves the way to abolition of the digger licences and sale of the land.

The film ends at a public auction of farmland at Ballarat where Lalor makes the winning bid. When asked to give his name the crowd gasp and a trooper rides up to him. But rather than be arrested he is praised.

== Cast ==
- Chips Rafferty as Peter Lalor
- Jane Barrett as Alicia Dunne
- Jack Lambert as Commissioner Rede
- Peter Illing as Raffaello Carboni
- Gordon Jackson as Tom Kennedy
- Ralph Truman as Governor Charles Hotham
- Sydney Loder as Frederick Vern
- John Fernside as sly grog seller
- Grant Taylor as Sergeant Major Milne
- Peter Finch as Humffray
- Alexander Cann as McGill
- Kevin Brennan as Black
- John Fegan as Hayes
- Al Thomas as James Scobie
- Ronald Whelan as Bentley
- Dorothy Alison as Mrs Bentley
- Reg Wykeham as Dr Moore
- Betty Ross as Mary O'Rourke
- John Wiltshire as Father Smythe
- Nigel Lovell as Captain Wise
- Charles Tasman as Governor Charles La Trobe
- Mary Ward as Lady Hotham
- John Cazabon as Henry Seekamp
- Nick Yardley as schoolboy
- Paul Delmar as Henry Ross
- Leigh O'Malley as Nelson
- Jean Blue as Ma McGinty
- Marshall Crosby as postmaster
- Rex Dawe as auctioneer
- Adrianna Watton as little girl
- Reg Lye as digger
- Leonard Teale

== Development ==
=== Rex Rienits ===
According to Rex Rienits, writing in 1948, there had been little interest in Eureka Stockade in the early 20th century. Rienits wrote that "except for spasmodic attempts to keep its memory alive by a few minor enthusiasts, whose crusading zeal outweighed their writing skill, it has been an almost dead chapter in our history for many years." This changed during World War II, with six publications in six years on the rebellion: two re-issues of Raffaello Carboni's account of the rebellion, Eureka Stockade (one with a preface by Doc Evatt); a novel by Rienits, Who Would Be Free (1944); a play by Louis Esson about the battle, Southern Cross (1946); a biography of Peter Lalor by Clive Turnbull; and a play by Les Haylen, Blood on the Wattle. Rienits argued "during this time of crisis hundreds of thousands of people began to realise actively something they had never realised before-that they were Australians" which he felt led to them examining their past, and "attention became focussed on the story of Eureka. For there can be little doubt that the crackle of musketry in the early dawn of Sunday, 3 December 1854, was a fanfare that heralded the democratic way of life we know today."

Rienits said the best sources on Eureka Stockade were Raffaelo's, and History of Ballarat by W.B. Withers (1870), as well as Further Papers Relative to the Discovery of Gold in Australia, 1852-57, and other government papers.

Rienits felt that the story of the Stockade "is a drama of masses, not of individuals. Lalor and Raffaello are no more the heroes than Hotham and Rede are the villains. Its conflict is between the people and authority; between the ideal of democracy and the fact of autocracy."

=== Harry Watt ===
Following the success of The Overlanders (1946), Ealing Studios were keen for Harry Watt to make another film in Australia. Rex Rienits claimed he had heard Watt wanted to make a historical picture, and sent the director a manuscript about Eureka Stockade while the latter was in London.

In September 1946 Watt said he had commissioned Jon Cleary to write a melodrama set in Sydney after the war about an RAF veteran who gets into trouble. Other topics he was interested in included Eureka Stockade and other Gold Rushes, Kalgoorlie, bushrangers, explorers like MacDougall Stuart or Burke and Wills, or the story of an outback family.

Watt left for Australia in late October 1946. Before he left, he said the plan was to make one film a year, and that the leading subjects were Eureka Stockade, a bushranger story, or the tale of a young RAF soldier emigrating to Australia. Watt added it was "premature to say that every film made" in Australia "will be a gold mine. I think the best policy from Australia's viewpoint, and also from that of producers, is to go cautiously and produce a small number of high-quality films, instead of rushing out a large number of second-raters, which would do more harm than good. Our own policy will be to make the film I am now planning next year. If that is successful, we will make another one the following year."

By the time Watt arrived in Australia, a few days later, he said his next film would be about Eureka Stockade and would star Chips Rafferty as Peter Lalor, with a script based on the research of Rex Rienits. He added:

I want to make, in The Eureka Stockade, a kind of film that has not been made before—an historical documentary. Documentary is a ghastly word that makes people, think of gasworks in the moonlight. But it means the realist approach to films, and the basis on fact. The incidents of Eureka fall dramatically into place without any distortion of facts. The story is an essential and integral part of Australian history. I don't want to make a political platform of this picture... It represents the turning point, in Australian history, to that democracy for which Australia has been known for so many years to the world. The history of the Eureka Stockade is unknown in England, and every person to whom I showed the historical material is vastly enthusiastic about it. We also want to make entertainment. and the Eureka Stockade is a terrifically dramatic subject—action, action, all the way.

A few days later Les Haylen said he was part of a syndicate that intended to make a rival film about Eurkea Stockade.

It was intended that production of the film would be on a more expensive, organised basis than The Overlanders. Leslie Norman later claimed Watt wanted to make the film because he "was a great socialist".

=== Script ===
The script was derived from a 75,000 word original research document prepared by Australian writer Rex Rienits, who was later given the credit "research". Watt decided to use this as the basis of the film. He decided that every main character would be factual – there would be no fictional characters. Watt said Rienits' research document in itself was too long to make a film script and that Australians were not good film script writers, as they were too influenced by radio. Accordingly, he brought Walter Greenwood, author of Love on the Dole, out to Australia to work on the script. Rienits stayed on the project as researcher. He arrived in Ballarat in December 1946 to do further research. It was only while there did Rienits become aware of the 1906 film made about the Stockade.

The first draft of the script was written by Greenwood, Watt and associate producer Leslie Norman during the voyage from England to Australia in February–March 1947. Greenwood focused on the dialogue while Norman and Watt did the story. "We had no typewriter, so Walter wrote it all in long hand", said Norman. Greenwood said he had done two months reading about Australian history beforehand. The writers tried to make the script as accurate as possible but had to make some changes for the sake of drama. Greenwood was back in London by July 1947.

Production of the movie triggered inevitable historical controversies. Various historical societies claimed ownership of the original Eureka flag. The design of the flag used in the film differs from the original Eureka flag. Peter Lalor's great-grandson complained about Chips Rafferty's casting, claiming he was nothing like Lalor.

=== Casting ===
Although Chips Rafferty had been in two recent hits, The Overlanders and Bush Christmas, his casting as Lalor was criticised almost immediately.

In March 1947 Ealing announced the actors supporting Rafferty would include John McCallum (an Australian then based in England) as Commissioner Rede, Jack Lambert, and Gordon Jackson. By May Peter Illing was added. Another Australian based in England was mentioned – Lloyd Jackson. In April 1947 John McCallum said reports of him appearing in the movie were premature, and he wound up not appearing in the movie.

When Watt arrived in Australia he said he wanted an Australian to play the female lead. He also said he wanted to cast eleven speaking parts in Australia.

In September 1947 it was announced Peter Finch would be casting director on the film. Finch announced shortly afterwards that he was seeking 16 Chinese to play coolies but "He's convinced now that Australia's Chinese are too well off to want to play a bit part in a film"

In late October 1947 Watt announced the cast, after a reported 150 screen tests, 200 auditions and 250 interviews: the leads would be played by Rafferty and Jane Barrett of England; Jack Lambert, Gordon Jackson and Peter Illing would be imported from England for support roles; Australians in the cast would be Grant Taylor (Milne), Peter Finch (Humfray), John Cazabon (newspaper editor), John Fegan (Hayes), Sydney Loder (Vern), Kevin Brennan (Black), Paul Delmar (Ross), John Wiltshire (Father Smythe), Al Thomas (Scobie), Marshall Crosby (postmaster Sullivan), Ron Whelan (hotel keeper Bentley), Nigel Lovell (Capt. Wise), Alex. Cann (McGill), Leigh O'Malley (Nelson), along with a thousand extras. Parts which remained to be cast included Mrs Bentley and Sir Charles Hotham. Nick Yardley, who was in Bush Christmas, was among several children cast.

In November 1947 Peter Illing, Jack Lambert and Gordon Jackson left England for Australia to play roles. They were accompanied by screen tests for the one remaining role to be cast out of England, the part of Sir Charles Hotham. A few days later, Harry Watt cabled his approval over the casting of Guy Rolfe as Hotham. In January 1948 Ealing announced that Guy Rolfe would be unable to go to Australia for medical reasons. Jane Barrett flew out to Australia in January 1948. She was signed under contract to ABC radio to perform in some plays.

Production was threatened when Actor's Equity placed a black ban on film contracts issued by Ealing Studios, Columbia Pictures Ltd. and Charles Chavel. However this issue was resolved.

== Pre production ==
When Watt returned to Australia in April 1947 he was accompanied by Leslie Norman, who would be assistant producer, screenwriter Walter Greenwood, Charles Woolveridge, Ealing art director, and Tom Shenton, make-up expert. Watt said "This is going to be an entertainment film, but we want to show how the story of this pathetic little movement of men fighting for their rights as citizens was really a vital part of the development of the Australian Commonwealth."

Watt said he intended to follow Stockade with Robbery Under Arms and a modern love story. Ealing would ship out £80,000 worth of equipment to help this. The intention was to start filming by September.

By June 1947 it was decided to make the film in Maitland. Shooting was scheduled to begin in September 1947 but was delayed for two months due to uncertainty about the film's classification as a "British" film. The British government had introduced a tax on film hire revenue earned by foreign films and for a time it was feared that Eureka Stockade would fall under this ambit. Ealing had to import a large number of British cast and crew to ensure its classification as a British film, which caused the budget to increase. It is estimated £20,000 of equipment was imported from England, and over 1,500 people worked on the film.

Interiors were shot at Pagewood and Cinesound studios, which were completely refurbished to make the film. A great deal of work in particular had to be done on Pagewood, which had fallen into disrepair during the war.

Because the country around Ballarat was no longer suitable, an alternative location was found in a valley near Singleton, New South Wales. A complete township was constructed, including buildings and mineshafts. The army helped in construction of the town.

== Shooting ==
Shooting began on 19 November 1947. The unit encountered a great deal of unfavourable weather, particularly rain and intense heat, forcing them to quickly get behind schedule. A member of the crew was involved in a car accident with a retired policeman in which the latter was killed.

From 19 December, the unit moved to Cinesound studios for two weeks of studio shooting. By this stage the production was already a month behind schedule. The unit returned to Singleton in January.

During filming Watt was dissatisfied with Chips Rafferty's performance; Leslie Norman suggested they replace him with Peter Finch who had a small support role. Watt ultimately decided not to do this and always regretted it.

Two crew members were married on the location, with Watt giving the bride away. Cast member Cecil Perry was arrested for getting drunk and taking off all his clothes in a public street. Female star Jane Barrett was hospitalised for a few days after an insect bite. A wardrobe assistant on the film, Richard Mason went on to have a successful career in Australian film as a producer.

Exterior shooting was completed in May 1948 with interiors done by August.

The budget eventually blew out from £160,000 to £200,000 (Another figure said £220,000 making it the most expensive film shot in Australia.) The final budget of £200,000 was the same amount Ealing had intended to spend on six films shot over two years in Australia. There were rumours that this would be Ealing's swan song. However the studio initially said they were happy with the footage and bought Pagewood Studios from Cinesound Productions with a view of making it a base for their future Australian operations.

In September 1948 Finch left Australia for England.

== Music ==
In March 1947 it was announced Vaughan Williams would come to Australia to do music for the movie.

== Reception ==
The film was released in London in January 1949. Early reviews were poor. Rafferty went to London for a ten-week promotional tour. He claimed the film was "packing them in in the provinces." However it was a financial disappointment. The film earned distributor's gross receipts of £55,855 in the UK of which £40,258 went to the producer.

The movie was given a gala premiere in Sydney in May. However it was not as well received as The Overlanders, either critically or with the public.

Filmink argued Watt "wound up making a dramatised documentary rather than a dramatic film, where every main character gives speeches rather than talks in dialogue, and the cast are almost entirely men of the same age, and almost no one comes across like a real person... Watt knows how to make his characters move – they storm stockades, burn hotels, yell at meetings – but they never come alive as humans."

== Impact ==
Ealing wound back its Australian production plans, including a proposed version of Robbery Under Arms. However, they did make three more movies in the country: Bitter Springs (1950), The Shiralee (1957) and The Siege of Pinchgut (1959).

It has been argued that the film prompted Rafferty to steer away from romantic roles for the rest of his career.

== Alternate title ==
An abridged version of the film was released in the United States of America under the title, Massacre Hill.

== Book ==
Rex Rienits wrote a book based on the script, which was published in 1949. The book included stills from the film.

== Notes ==
- Rienits, Rex. The Eureka Stockade [online]. Meanjin, Vol. 7, No. 4, Summer 1948: 249–254. ISSN 1324-1745.
