= Hotham =

Hotham may refer to:

== Places ==
=== Australia ===
- Hotham, Northern Territory, a locality
- Division of Hotham, electoral division
- Mount Hotham
- Mount Hotham Alpine Resort
- The original name of North Melbourne

=== Elsewhere ===
- Hotham, East Riding of Yorkshire, England
- Hotham, Ontario
- Hotham Park, Bognor Regis, England

== People ==
- Alan Hotham (1876–1965), Royal Navy officer and cricketer
- Beaumont Hotham, 3rd Baron Hotham (1794–1870), British soldier, peer, and Member of Parliament
- Charles Hotham (1806–1855), Governor of Victoria, Australia
- Sir Charles Frederick Hotham (1843–1925), British Royal Navy Admiral who was Commander-in-Chief, Portsmouth
- Henry Hotham (1777–1833), British naval officer who served during the Napoleonic Wars
- Jazmin Hotham (born 2000), New Zealand rugby sevens player
- John Hotham (1589–1645), Parliamentarian military leader of the English Civil War who sought an accommodation with the Royalist side
- John Hotham the younger (1610–1645), son of the above, an English Member of Parliament during the English Civil War
- John Hotham (bishop) (died 1337), English medieval Bishop of Ely
- John de Hotham (died 1361), English medieval university chancellor
- Richard Hotham (1722–1799) East India merchant, property developer and politician
- Thomas Hotham (fl. 1320s), English medieval university chancellor
- William Hotham, 1st Baron Hotham (1736–1813), British admiral who saw service during the American Revolutionary War and French Revolutionary Wars
- William Hotham (1772–1848), British naval officer who saw service during the French Revolutionary and Napoleonic Wars

== Ships ==
- HMS Hotham, the name of more than one ship of the British Royal Navy
- USS Hotham, the name of more than one United States Navy ship

== See also ==
- de Hotham
