= Victorian gold rush =

Period in the history of Victoria, Australia

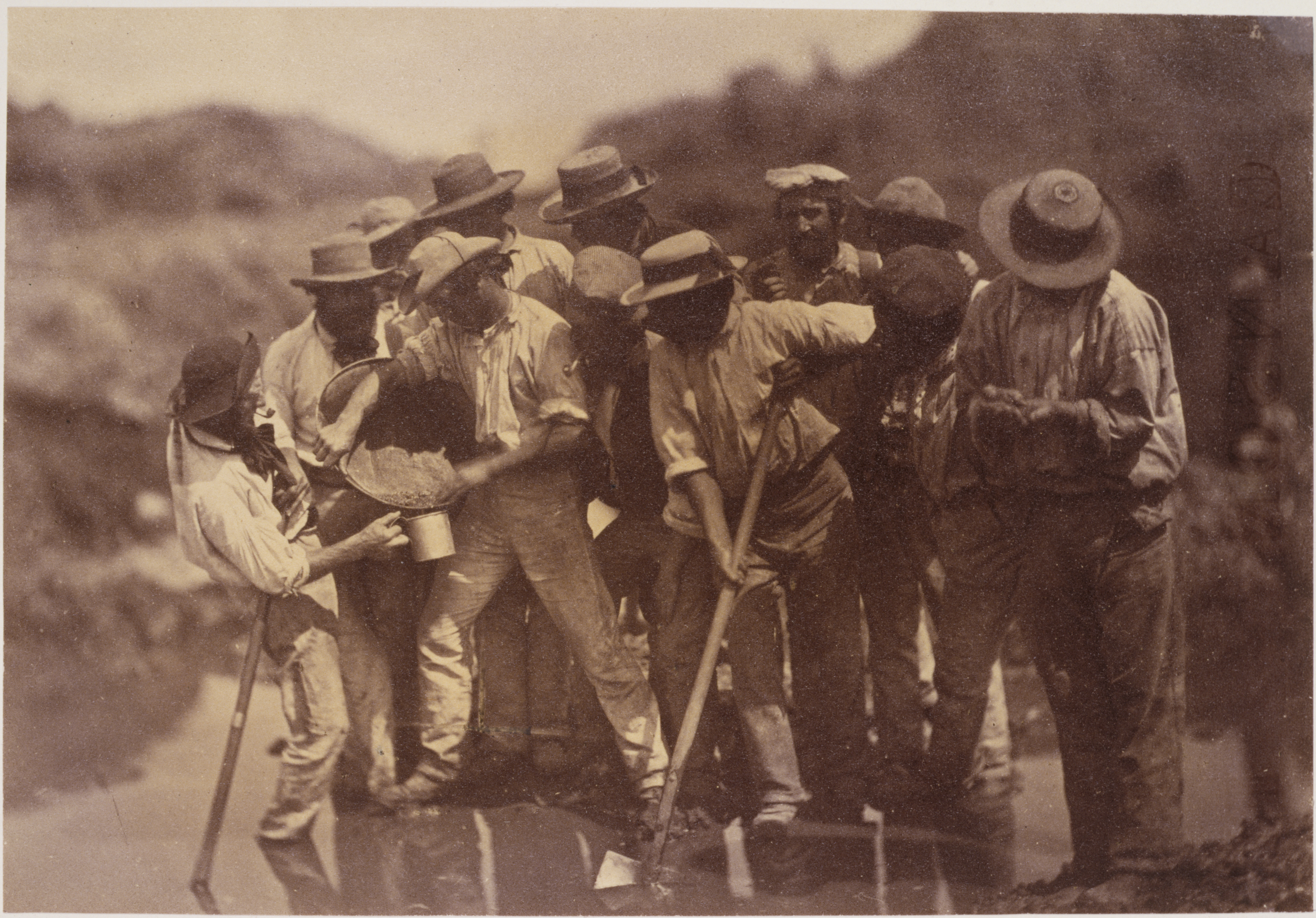
Richard Daintree and Antoine Fauchery (circa 1858) A gang of diggers at Forrest Creek, Chewton

The Victorian gold rush was a period in the history of Victoria, Australia, approximately between 1851 and the late 1860s. It led to a period of extreme prosperity for the Australian colony and an influx of population growth and financial capital for Melbourne, which was dubbed "Marvellous Melbourne" as a result of the procurement of wealth.

== Overview ==
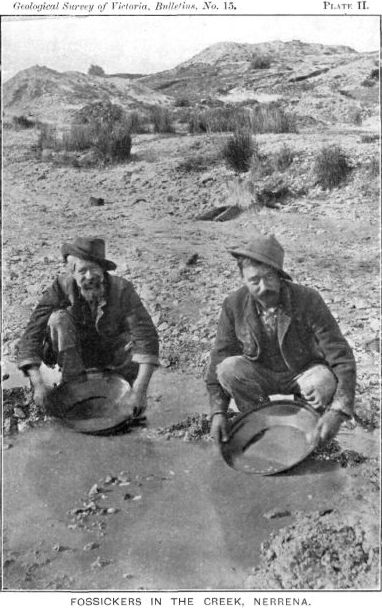
Fossickers in the Nerrena Creek outside Ballarat

The Victorian Gold Discovery Committee wrote in 1854:

The discovery of the Victorian Goldfields has converted a remote dependency into a country of worldwide fame; it has attracted a population, extraordinary in number, with unprecedented rapidity; it has enhanced the value of property to an enormous extent; it has made this the richest country in the world; and, in less than three years, it has done for this colony the work of an age, and made its impulses felt in the most distant regions of the earth.

With the exception of the more extensive fields of California, for a number of years the gold output from Victoria was greater than in any other country in the world. Victoria's greatest yield for one year was in 1856, when 3,053,744 troy ounces (94,982 kg) of gold were extracted from the diggings. From 1851 to 1896 the Victorian Mines Department reported that a total of 61,034,682 oz (1,898,391 kg) of gold was mined in Victoria.

Gold was first discovered in Australia on 15 February 1823, by assistant surveyor James McBrien, at Fish River, between Rydal and Bathurst (in New South Wales). The find was considered unimportant at the time and was not pursued for policy reasons.

In the 1850s gold discoveries in Victoria, in Beechworth, Castlemaine, Daylesford, Ballarat and Bendigo sparked gold rushes similar to the California Gold Rush. At its peak, some two tonnes of gold per week flowed into the Treasury Building in Melbourne.

The gold exported to Britain in the 1850s paid off all of Britain's foreign debts and helped lay the foundation of her enormous commercial expansion in the latter half of the century.

Melbourne was a major boomtown during the gold rush. The city became the centre of the colony with rail networks radiating to the regional towns and ports.

Politically, Victoria's gold miners sped up the introduction of greater parliamentary democracy in Victoria, based on British Chartist principles adopted to some extent by the miners' activist bodies such as Bendigo's Anti-Gold Licence Association and the Ballarat Reform League.

As the alluvial gold dwindled, pressures for land reform, protectionism and political reform generated social struggles, and a Land Convention in Melbourne during 1857 recorded demands for land reform.

By 1854, Chinese people were contributing to the gold rushes. Their presence on the goldfields of Bendigo, Beechworth and the Bright district resulted in riots, entry taxes, killings, and segregation in the short term, and became the foundations of the White Australia policy. In short, the gold rush was a revolutionary event and reshaped Victoria, its society and politics.

== Background ==
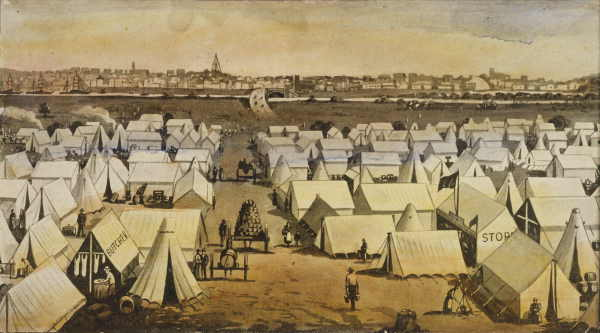
Canvas Town, South Melbourne in the 1850s

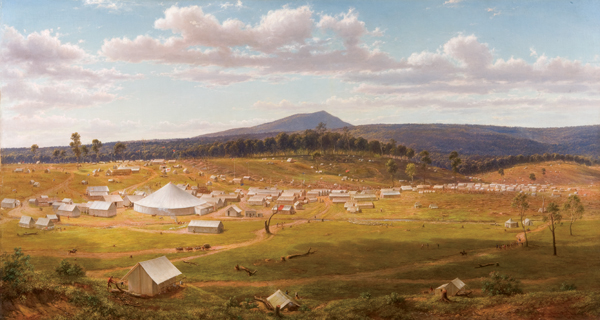
Ballarat's tent city just a couple of years after the discovery of gold in the district. Oil painting from an original 1853 sketch by Eugene von Guerard.

There were rumours abroad about the presence of gold in Australia, but Government officials kept all findings secret for fear of disorganising the young colony. However the Colonial Secretary, Edward Deas Thomson, saw a great future for the country when Edward Hargraves proved his theory that Australia was a vast storehouse of gold. Hargraves had been in the California gold rush and knew gold country, when he first saw it, round Bathurst. The news spread and soon the race was on from coast to gold fields. Flocks were left untended, drovers deserted their teams, merchants and lawyers rushed from their desks and entire ships' crews, captains included, marched off to seek their fortunes.

=== Gold discovery ===
In March 1850, William Campbell of Strath Loddon, found on the station of his brother-in-law, Donald Cameron, of Clunes several minute pieces of native gold in quartz. This was concealed at the time but on 10 January 1851, Campbell disclosed it. Others had found indications of gold. Dr. George H. Bruhn, a German physician, whose services as an analyst were in great demand, had been shown specimens of gold from what afterwards became the Clunes diggings. In spite of these and other discoveries, however, it was impracticable to market the gold, and James Esmond's "find" which was made on Creswick's Creek, a tributary of the Loddon River, at Clunes on 1 July 1851, was the first marketable gold field.

A party formed by Mr. Louis John Michel, consisting of himself, Mr. William Haberlin, James Furnival, James Melville, James Headon, and B. Groenig, discovered the existence of gold in the quartz rocks of the Yarra ranges, at Andersons Creek, near Warrandyte, in the latter part of June, and showed it on the spot to Dr. Webb Richmond, on behalf of the Gold Discovery Committee on 5 July.

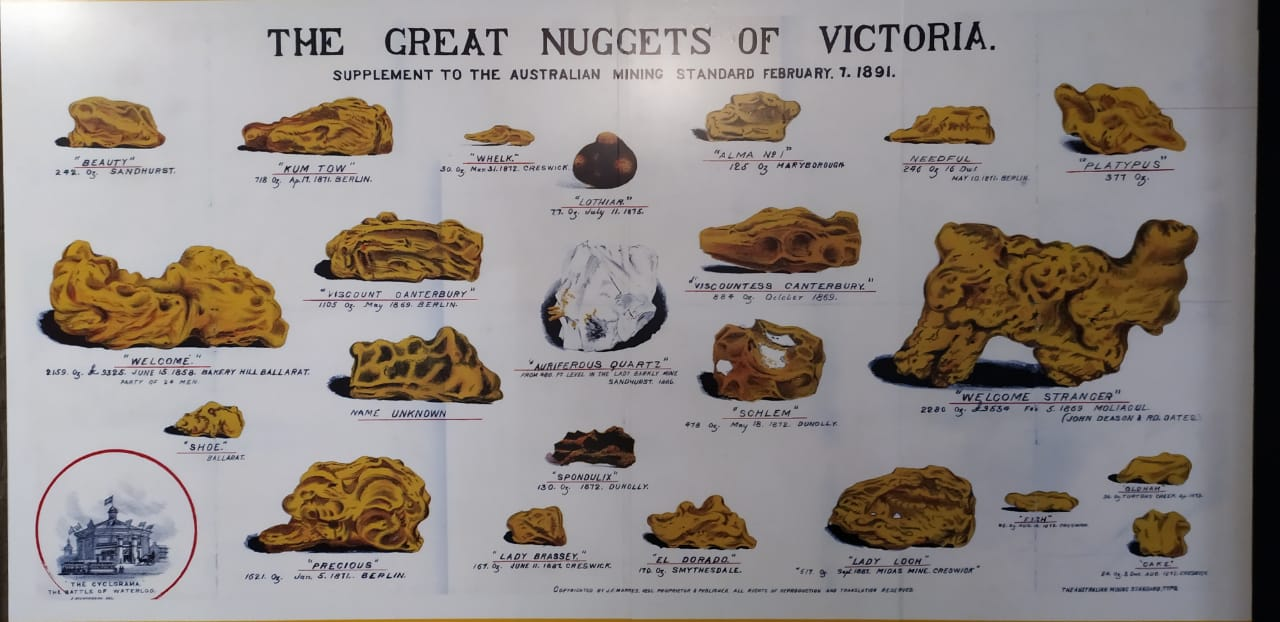
A chart showing the great nuggets of Victoria at Museums Victoria

The third discovery was by Mr. Thomas Hiscock, a resident at Buninyong; induced by the writings of the Rev. W. B. Clarke, and by the discovery of Brentani's nugget in the Pyrenees district two years before, he had kept a constant lookout for gold in his neighbourhood. He discovered an auriferous deposit in the gully of the Buninyong ranges now bearing his name, on 8 August 1851, and he communicated the fact, with its precise locality, to the editor of the Geelong Advertiser on the 10th of that month.

Dr. George H. Bruhn, a German physician, in the month of January, 1851, (i.e. before Mr. Hargraves' discovery at Summerhill) started from Melbourne to explore "the mineral resources of this colony'. During his lengthened tour, he found, in April, indications of gold in quartz about two miles from Mr. Barker's station, and on arriving at Mr. Cameron's station was shown by that gentleman specimens of gold at what are now called the Clunes diggings. This information he made widely known through the country in the course of his journey, and communicated to Mr. James Esmond, at that time engaged in erecting a building at Mr. James Hodgkinson's station. Dr. Bruhn forwarded specimens, which were received by the Gold Discovery Committee on 30 June 1851.

The Gold Discovery Committee awarded £1000 to Michel and his party; £1000 to Hiscock, as the substantial discoverer of the Ballarat deposits; £1000 to Campbell as the original discoverer of Clunes; £1000 to Esmond as the first active producer of alluvial gold for the market and £500 to Dr. Bruhn.

On 20 July 1851 Thomas Peters, a hut-keeper on William Barker's Mount Alexander station, found specks of gold at what is now known as Specimen Gully. This find was published in the Melbourne Argus on 8 September 1851, leading to a rush to the Mount Alexander or Forest Creek diggings, centred on present-day Castlemaine, claimed as the richest shallow alluvial goldfield in the world.

These discoveries were soon surpassed by Ballarat and Bendigo. Further discoveries including Beechworth in 1852, Bright, Omeo, Chiltern (1858–59) and Walhalla followed.

Year	Non-indigenous population of Melbourne
1835	0
1840	10,000
1851	29,000
1854	123,000

The population of Melbourne grew swiftly as the gold fever took hold, as did the colony's total population: from 1851 to 1861, it grew from 75,000 to 500,000.

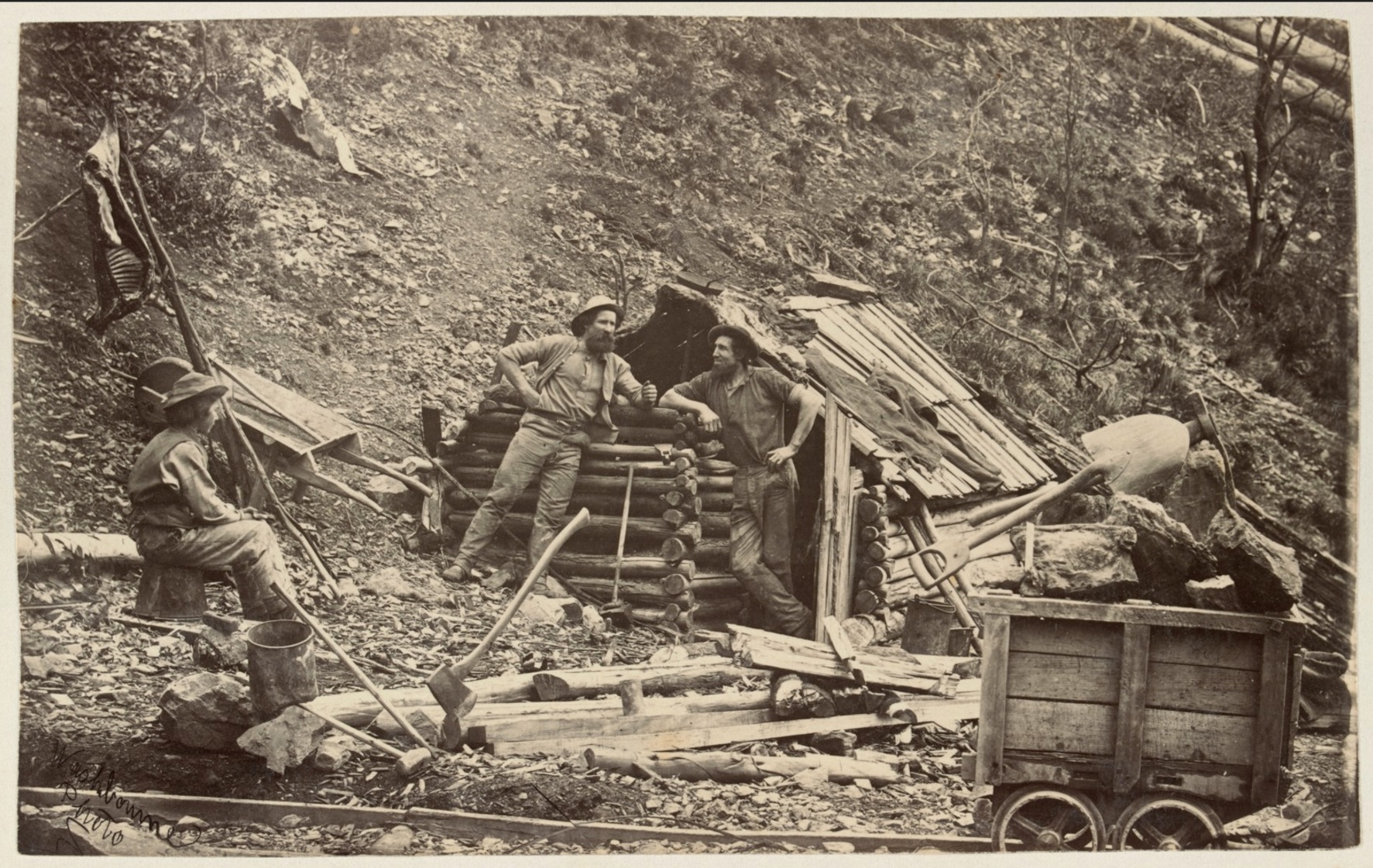
Prospector's Hut, Upper Dargo, Victoria (Gippsland), 1870

Surface alluvial gold was the first to be exploited. It is reported that in 1851, when the first miners arrived on the Mount Alexander goldfield, near Castlemaine, nuggets could be picked up without digging. Then followed the exploitation of alluvial gold in creeks and rivers, or deposited in silt on river banks and flats. The gold-seekers used pans, sluice boxes and cradles to separate this gold from the dirt.

As surface alluvial gold ran out, gold seekers were forced to look further underground. Miners discovered so-called deep leads, which were gold-bearing watercourses that had been buried at various depths by centuries of silting and, in some Victorian goldfields such as Ballarat, volcanic action. They also began to exploit the underground gold reefs which were the original sources of the gold. Deep mining was more difficult and dangerous. Places such as Bendigo and Ballarat saw great concentrations of miners, who were forming partnerships and syndicates to enable them to sink ever-deeper shafts. Coupled with erratic and vexatious policing and licence checks, tensions flared around Beechworth, Bendigo and Ballarat. These frictions culminated in the Eureka Rebellion in Ballarat in 1854. Following that uprising, a range of reforms gave miners a greater say in resolving disputes via Mining Courts, and extended electoral franchise to them.

As gold-rush immigrants flooded into Victoria in 1852, a tent city, known as Canvas Town, was established at South Melbourne. The area soon became a massive slum, home to tens of thousands of migrants from around the world who arrived to seek their fortunes in the goldfields. Significant Chinatowns became established in Melbourne, Bendigo and Castlemaine.

At Walhalla alone, Cohens Reef produced over 50 tonnes (1.6 million tr oz) of gold in 40 years of mining.

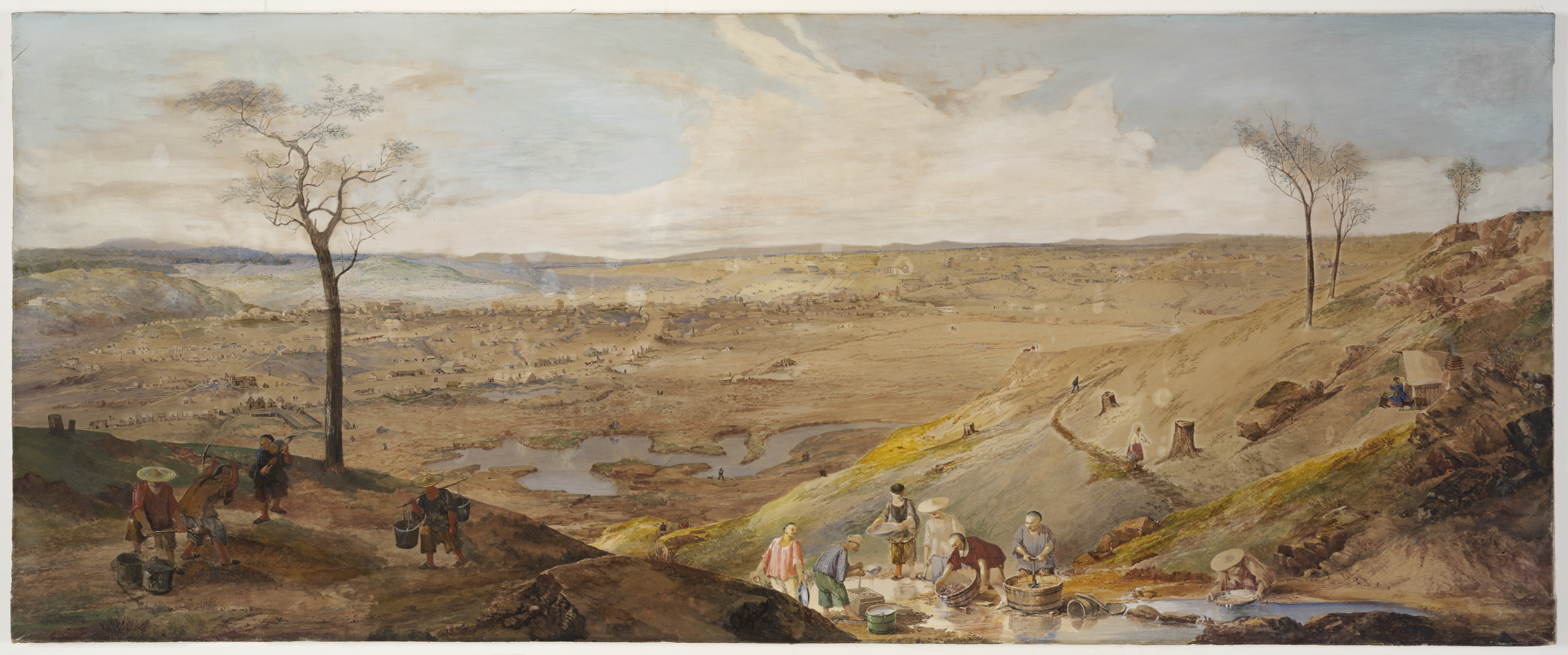
Bird's-eye view of Ballarat with Chinese gold miners in the foreground, 1858, by George Rowe

== Chinese involvement in the Victorian gold rush ==
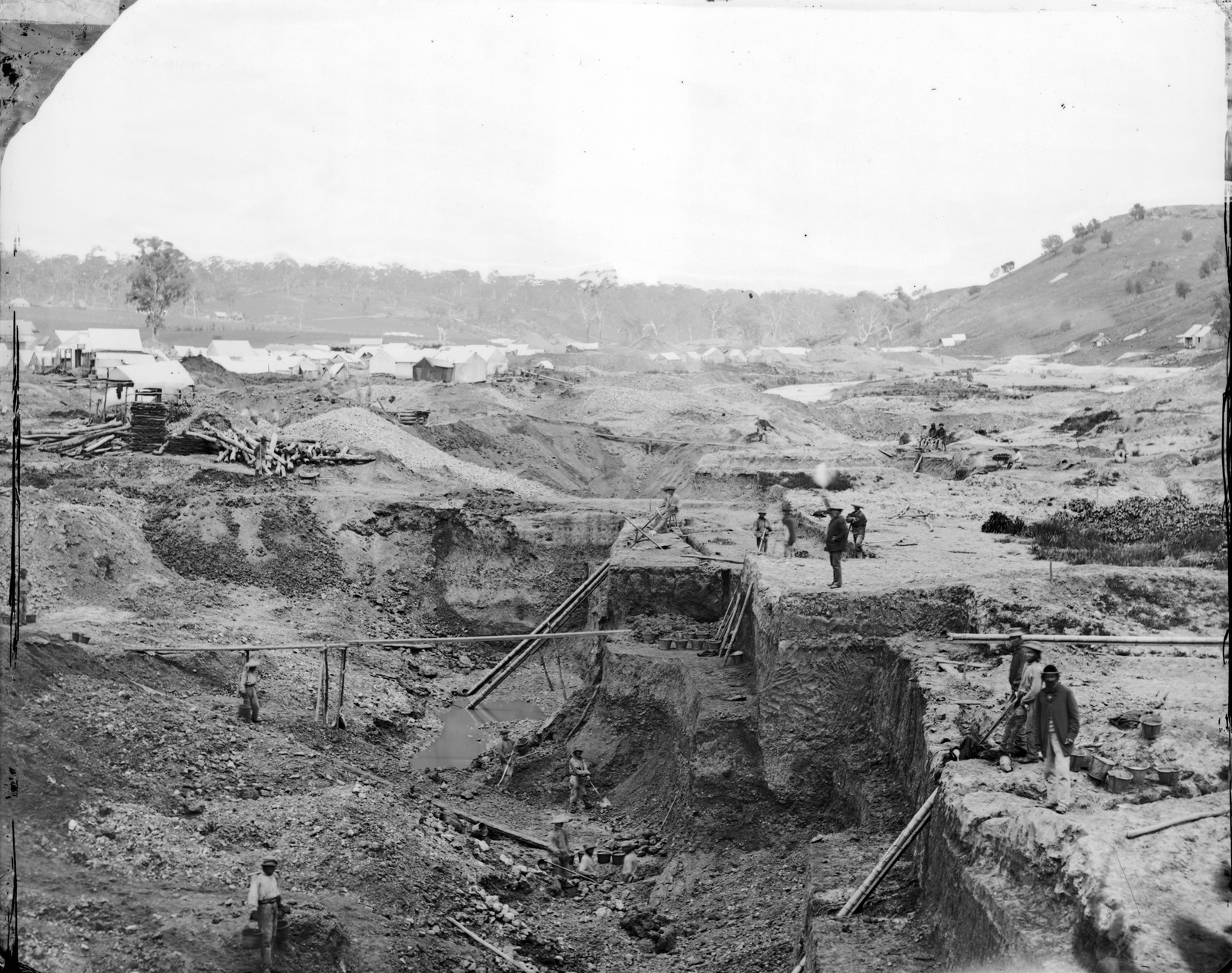
Chinese mining operation at Guildford, Victoria

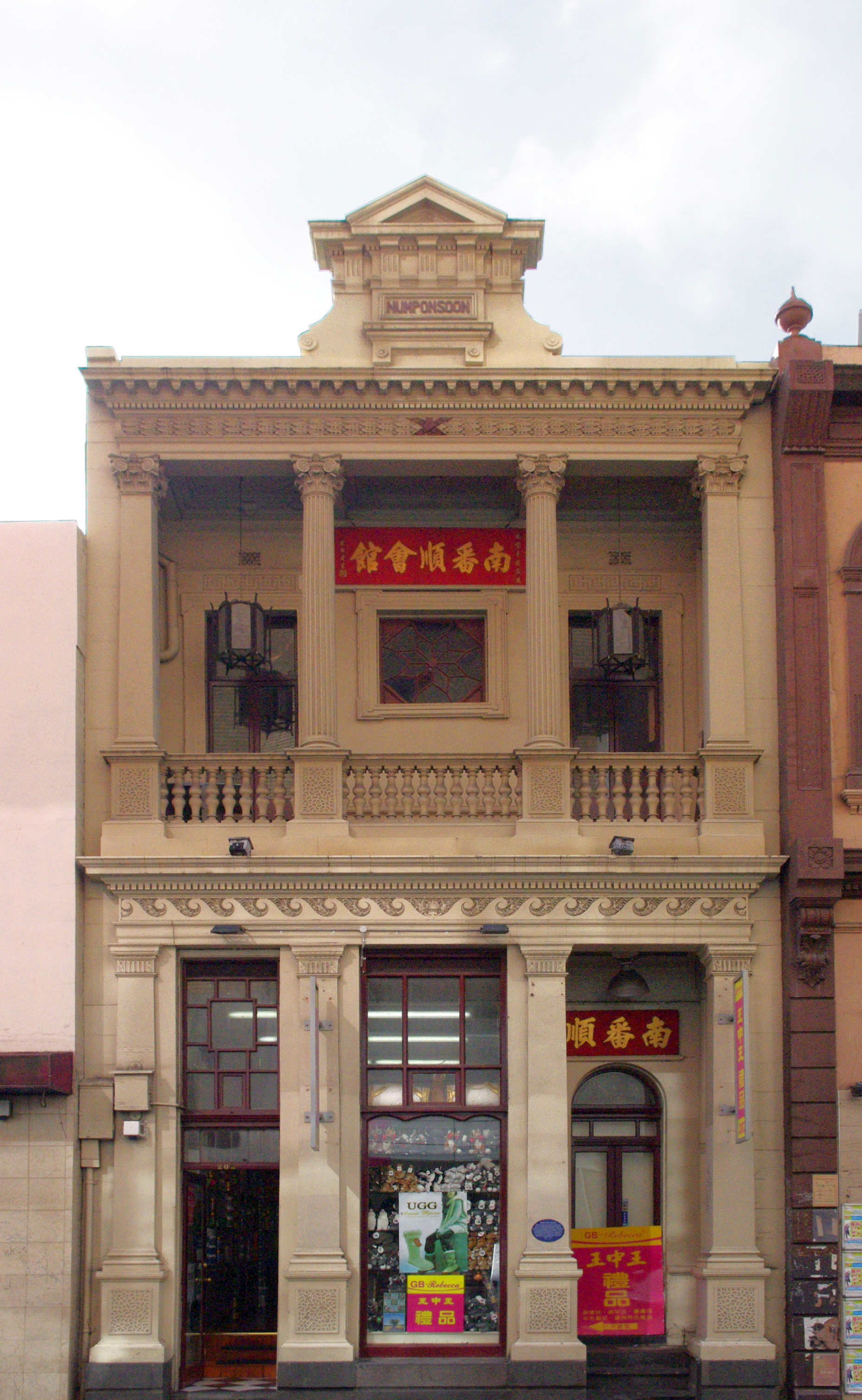
The Num Pon Soon building in Chinatown, Melbourne. Chinatown was founded by Chinese immigrants who came to Victoria during the Victorian Gold Rush. The Num Pon Soon Society was one of a number of district societies and benevolent associations aimed at supporting Chinese immigrants during the Victorian gold rush.

News of the gold discoveries in the colonies of New South Wales and Victoria in 1851 quickly arrived in the provinces of Southern China. By the end of 1855, more than 19,000 Chinese immigrants, particularly from the Guangdong province of China, were estimated to be working on the Victorian goldfields of Ararat, Ballarat, Ovens, Bendigo, Castlemaine and Maryborough. By 1858 this number increased to roughly 33,000 and Chinese miners were estimated to have made up approximately one fifth of Victoria's miner population. Figures suggest that Victoria's Chinese population began to dwindle after 1858. This is likely due to a decrease in the number of new gold discoveries in Victoria during this period.

Like European gold diggers, the majority of Chinese miners in Victoria worked either independently or with a partner upon arrival. As gold however became harder to find in Victoria's goldfields the Chinese population of Victoria began to form their own mining cooperatives and companies. An unofficial 1868 census on the Chinese population in Victorian gold districts suggests that 660 out of the 765 Chinese miners in Daylesford and half of the 4000 Chinese miners in the Oven District had "form[ed] themselves into small companies" by 1868.

A minority of Chinese miners in Victoria were also employed by European mining companies. The 1868 census on the Chinese population in Victoria suggests that 700 Chinese miners in the Oven District were working for European companies which were paying their employees £1 to £2 per week. Smaller numbers of Chinese miners were also reported to be working for European companies in Maryborough, Ballarat and Daylesford.

The rapid influx of Chinese migrants into the Colony of Victoria aroused large amounts of anxiety within Victoria's European population. On April the 14th 1855, The Argus, a daily newspaper in Melbourne, described the growing Chinese population within Victoria as an "invading army" whose presence will "subject the community to the demoralizing influence of their ideas".

In June 1855, the Victorian government passed 'an act to make provision for certain immigrants'. The act sought to limit the number of Chinese immigrants that a vessel could carry to one for every ten tons of shipping and required the ship's master to pay a £10 poll tax for each Chinese passenger it carried. The act however failed to reduce the number of Chinese arriving on Victorian Gold Fields. By landing at the port of Robe in the colony of South Australia and travelling more than 400 km across country to the Victorian goldfields, Chinese gold seekers were able to successfully evade the restrictions of Victoria's immigration act.

In November 1857, the Victorian government passed 'an act to regulate the residence of the Chinese Population in Victoria'. This act required all Chinese residing in Victoria to obtain a £1 license which had to be renewed every two months for an additional £1 in order to remain in the Colony of Victoria. The residence tax was, however, reduced in February 1859 and repealed in 1862 due to Chinese protests against the legislation, increasing levels of tax evasion, and a downturn in Victoria's mining population.

The increasing presence of Chinese miners on Victorian goldfields eventually resulted in anti-Chinese riots taking place on several Victorian goldfields. On 8 July 1854, an estimated 1500 European miners meeting at a hotel in Bendigo planned a riot to drive the Chinese out of Bendigo. This riot was, however, brought to a stop by the arrival of police. The worst attack on Victoria's Chinese miners occurred at the goldfields of Buckland River on 4 July 1857. Following a group meeting at the Buckland Hotel, an estimated 100 European miners sought to expel all 2500 Chinese miners that occupied the goldfields of the Buckland River through the use of tent and store burning, robbery and beatings. Drowning and severe beatings are believed to have resulted in the death of several Chinese miners. This event has come to be known as the Buckland Riot.

== Lead-up to the Eureka Stockade ==
The conditions which led up to the Eureka Stockade arose mainly from the actions taken by the Government in supervising the various goldfields. To meet the expense of securing order and to restrain unauthorised mining on Crown land, a local act of January 1852 imposed on all diggers a licence fee of 30 shillings per month, the penalty for mining without a licence being £6 for the first offence and afterwards imprisonment for terms up to six months. Clause 7 of this act also appropriated half the fine to the use of the informer or prosecutor, a provocative and irritating provision. In December 1853, the Goldfields Act 1853 reduced the fee to £1 per month, but did not alter the diggers' greatest grievance, that they could be imprisoned for not having the actual licence on them, though their possession of one could be proved from the official record. They were also unrepresented in Parliament, and in 1854 the population on the Ballarat goldfields was estimated at 20,000.

Charles Hotham, who arrived in Victoria in June 1854, was alarmed at the depleted state of the Treasury and the growing expense of goldfields administration. He ordered the police to redouble their exertions in collecting the fees. To miners just scraping by, the payment of £12 per annum was impossible, and there is no doubt that hundreds did endeavour to evade payment, but the innocent suffered with the guilty. The police, too, had been largely recruited from Tasmania, and many were ex-convicts. These grievances were common to all the Victorian fields, and had under Latrobe's administration produced riots at Beechworth and Castlemaine, but Ballarat, always the most domestic of the goldfields, was renowned for its peaceful progressiveness and quietness.

On the night of 6 October, however, a Scottish miner named James Scobie was killed at the Eureka Hotel, near Ballarat, and the murdered man's associate blamed the murder on the proprietor, Bentley, a Tasmanian ex-convict. Bentley was brought up before a magistrate, who was alleged to be financially under Bentleys' thumb, and he was discharged. The miners were indignant; a meeting was called and a demand made for a fresh prosecution. The meeting itself was orderly, but towards the end of proceedings a cry was raised that the police (who had been ordered to protect the hotel) were trying to disperse the meeting, and the miners, becoming furious, swept aside the police, smashed the windows and furniture, and burned the building. The police arrested three men- who could not be proved to have been ringleaders or active in the riot, and they were sentenced to three, four, and six months' imprisonment.

At an indignation meeting held on 11 November on Bakery Hill, the Ballarat Reform League was formed, with John Basson Humffray (a Welshman) as its first secretary, and Peter Lalor, Frederic Vern (a Hanoverian), Raffaello Carboni (an Italian teacher, of languages), Timothy Hayes (an Irishman), and George Black, a well-educated Englishman, as prominent members. A deputation of three men waited on Governor Hotham to demand the release of the prisoners, but he refused and had already sent additional troops to Ballarat, which gave considerable offence by marching through the town with fixed bayonets and by other exasperating conduct. On 29 November, Black, Humffray, and Kennedy reported to a mass meeting held at Bakery Hill the result of their deputation to the Governor, and Vern proposed a burning of the hated licences, which was then carried out. Next day the police carried out a specially vicious and vigorous licence-hunt, and when the troops marched back to camp, the diggers hastened to a conference with the leaders of the Reform League.

Peter Lalor was elected leader, and under a blue flag adorned with the stars of the Southern Cross the assembled diggers swore 'to stand truly by each other and fight to defend our rights and liberties.' An area of about an acre on the present Eureka site was hastily enclosed with a pallisade and a deputation was sent to the military camp demanding the release of the morning's prisoners and the cessation of licence-hunting. The Commissioner flatly refused the request, saying that the agitation was 'only a cloak to cover a democratic revolution.' On 1 December the occupants of the stockade were hard at work by 5 a.m. drilling and improving the barrier, and a German blacksmith was fashioning pike-heads. But neither food nor ammunition was available within the stockade, so that by the evening of the 2nd after a very hot day, not more than 200 remained within.

Spies informed the Commissioner of the situation and about 4.30 a.m. on Sunday morning (3 December) a troop of 276 men was marched silently to the stockade. Inside the stockade only 50 diggers had rifles; there was also a troop of Californian diggers armed with revolvers and another of Irishmen with pikes. Many of them were asleep when the signal gun was fired and a storming party of 64 'rushed' the stockade. In the first volleys several men fell on both sides, but the line of advancing bayonets, flanked on both sides by cavalry and mounted police, was too much for the diggers. They turned to seek shelter and all was over. Of the military force Captain Wise and four private soldiers were killed, and about a dozen injured. Sixteen miners were killed, and at least eight others died of their wounds, 114 prisoners were taken, and Lalor, badly wounded, managed to escape; so did Black and Vern. The Government then offered £500 for the apprehension of Vern, and £200 each for Black and Lalor.

== Legacy ==
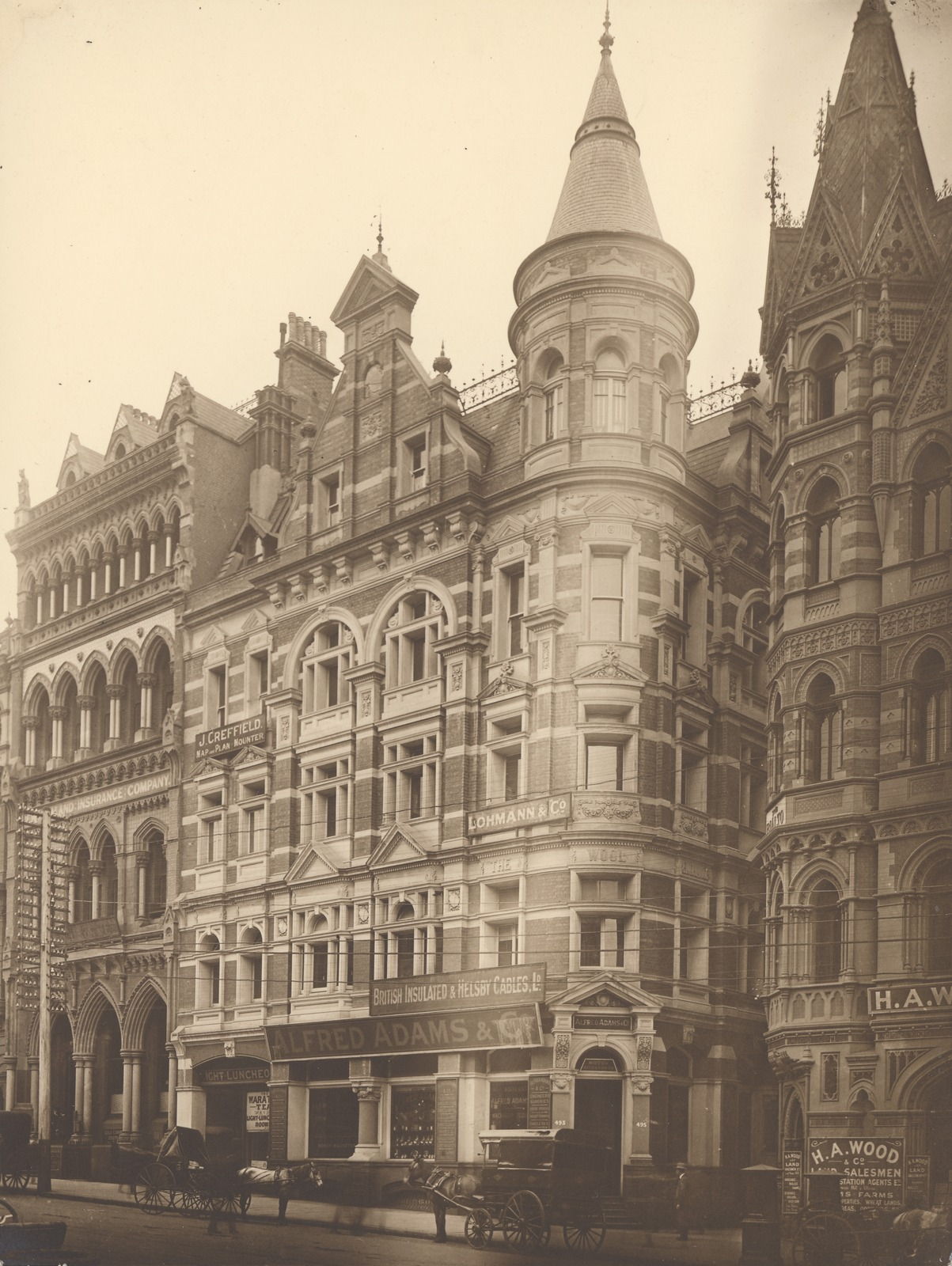
Wool Exchange (1891) in Melbourne's city centre, which saw many elaborate buildings erected during this period.

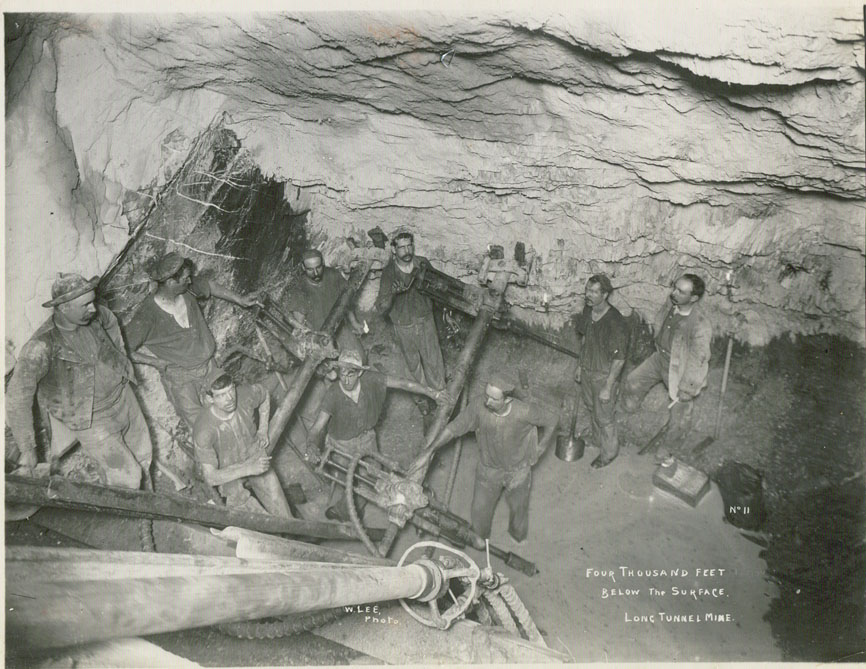
Underground mining at Walhalla, Victoria in 1910

Australia's population changed dramatically as a result of the rushes. In 1851 the Australian population was 437,655, of which 77,345, or just under 18%, were Victorians. A decade later the Australian population had grown to 1,151,947 and the Victorian population had increased to 538,628; just under 47% of the Australian total and a seven-fold increase. In some small country towns where gold was found abundantly, the population could grow by over 1000% in a decade (e.g. Rutherglen had a population of about 2,000. Ten years later, it had approximately 60,000 which is a 3000% increase). The rapid growth was predominantly a result of the gold rushes.

The gold rush is reflected in the architecture of Victorian gold-boom cities like Melbourne, Castlemaine, Ballarat, Bendigo and Ararat. Ballarat today has Sovereign Hill—a 60-acre (24 ha) recreation of a gold rush town—as well as the Gold Museum. Bendigo has a large operating gold mine system which also functions as a tourist attraction.

The rushes left Victorian architecture in towns in the Goldfields region such as Maldon, Beechworth, Clunes, Heathcote, Maryborough, Daylesford, Stawell, Beaufort, Creswick, St Arnaud, Dunolly, Inglewood, Wedderburn and Buninyong whose economy has differing emphases on home working, tourism, farming, modern industrial and retired sectors. With the exception of Ballarat and Bendigo, many of these towns were substantially larger than they are today. Most populations moved to other districts when gold played out in a given locality. At the other end of the spectrum ghost towns, such as Walhalla, Mafeking and Steiglitz exist.

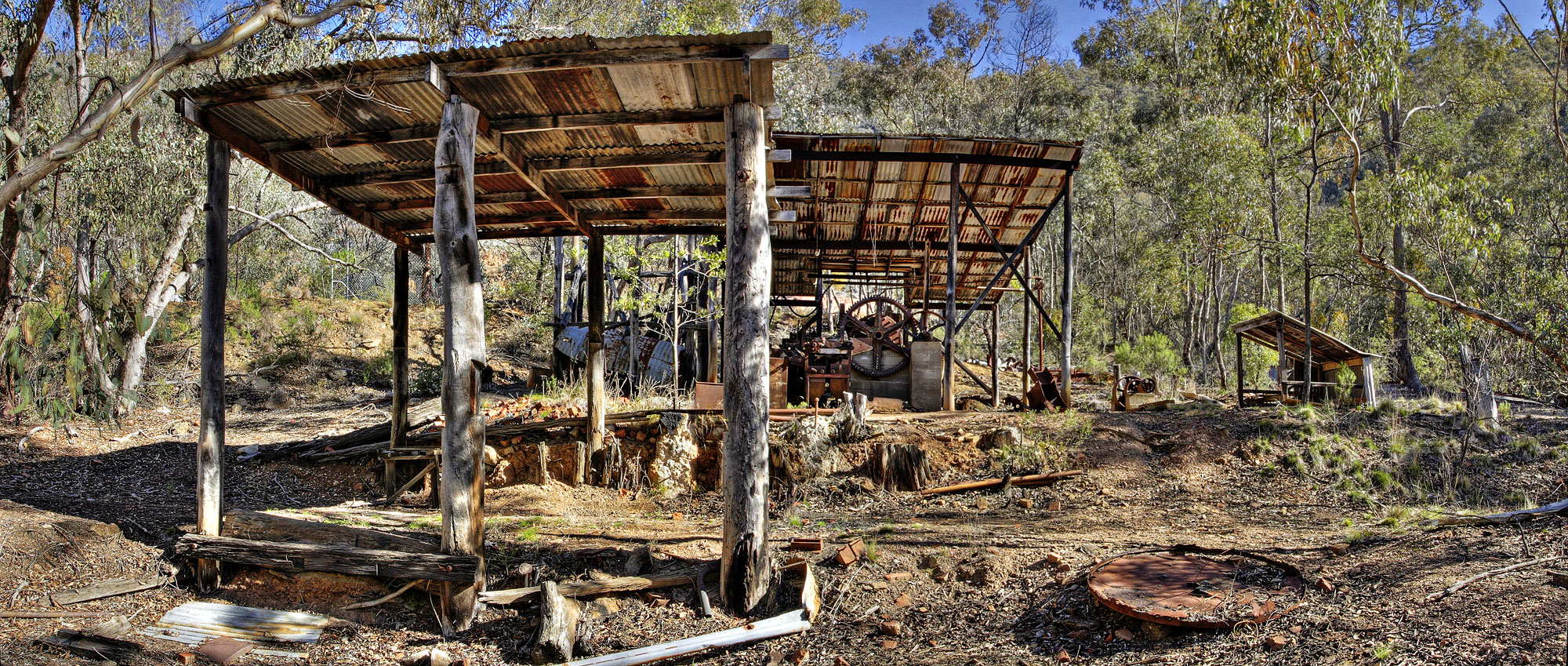
As with many gold towns, after deposits of gold had been exploited, the town of Cassilis ceased to exist. This picture shows the remains of part of King Cassilis Mine

The last major gold rush in Victoria was at Berringa, south of Ballarat, in the first decade of the 20th century. Gold mining became nothing more than a hobby in Victoria for decades mainly because of the depth and cost of pumping. The First World War also drained Australia of the labour needed to work the mines. More significantly, the prohibition on the export of gold from Australia in 1915 and the abolition of the gold standard, winding down stockpiling of gold and production of sovereigns throughout the Empire saw Australian gold towns shrink, in some cases, being totally abandoned. The slump in gold production never recovered. Gold mining ceased in Stawell in 1920, but recommenced in 1982 and continued into the 21st century. However, as of 2005 the recent increase in the gold price has seen a resurgence in commercial mining activity with mining resuming in both of the major fields of Bendigo and Ballarat. Exploration also proceeds elsewhere, for example, in Glen Wills, an isolated mountain area near Mitta Mitta in north-eastern Victoria.

== See also ==
- Australian gold rushes
- New South Wales gold rush
- California Gold Rush (1848–1855)
- Colonial liberalism
- Gold rush
- Goldfields region of Victoria
- Klondike Gold Rush
- Oriental Claims
- Welcome Stranger
- The Cheese Stick, sculpture inspired by the gold rush
