= Clara Seekamp =

Australian newspaper editor

- Born: Clara Maria Lodge; 1819; Ireland
- Died: January 22, 1908 (aged 88–89); Pascoe Vale, Victoria, Australia
- Occupations: Editor; Actress

Clara Maria Seekamp (born Clara Maria Lodge; 1819–1908) was the first female editor of The Ballarat Times, an Australian newspaper.

== Early life ==
She was born Clara Lodge in Ireland, in 1819 to Francis Lodge. She married her dancing teacher, George William Du Val (brother of portrait painter Charles Allen Du Val) on 25 September 1832 when she was a young teenager. By 1841, they were living in Liverpool in the boarding house of Elizabeth Lodge, a possible relation of Clara. They had three children; Oliver, Francis and Clara, and came to the attention of the law on several occasions. In one incident her husband was arrested in Liverpool after being involved in a kidnapping gone wrong.

== Arriving in Australia ==
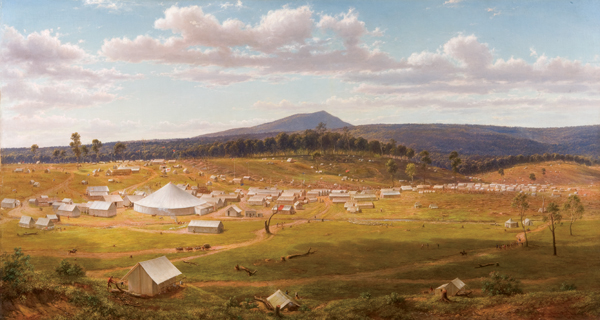
How Ballarat appeared in the summer of 1853–54, around the time of Clara's arrival. Painting by Eugene von Guerard

Clara Du Val arrived in Melbourne, Australia in May 1853, with two of her children, but without her husband, and having recorded her age as 20 (she was actually 34). There is no further record of George Du Val; it is not known whether he died, or they separated. Her two sons accompanied her, but her daughter Clara was left behind in Ireland.

She became an actress at a tent theatre set up in an area known as the Gravel Pits in the gold mining town of Ballarat, and conducted a theatrical company there.

== The Ballarat Times ==
By 1854, Clara had become the de facto wife of Henry Seekamp, editor and publisher of The Ballarat Times, and 10 years her junior. Although they referred to each other as husband and wife, and Clara and her younger children took Seekamp's name, no official record of a marriage has been found. The Ballarat Times was run in their household, which was on Bakery Hill, close to the Gravel Pits. The newspaper was successful, and the little building they had had before was turned into a compound which consisted of: a printing office, stables, a kitchen, a separate residence, office and a coach-house. Her husband was a supporter of the Ballarat Reform League, and the newspaper's fiery editorials on behalf of the miners eventually drew government attention. The day after the Eureka Stockade, Henry Seekamp was arrested for seditious libel on 4 December 1855.

== Writing ==
Historian Clare Wright speculates that Clara herself may have written some of the offending editorials, (Henry claimed in his defence that he had not written all of them) as she was erudite enough, and more convenient than other candidates that have been suggested. Certainly while Henry was in jail, Clara took over the running of the Ballarat Times, becoming the first female editor of an Australian newspaper, and her editorials proved equally, if not more outspoken than her husband's.

After Governor Hotham accused unnamed 'foreigners' of stirring up the rebellion, Clara responded with the New Year's Day editorial of 1855, writing:

What is it that constitutes a foreigner? ... 'Could you not have found some other and' more truthful excuse for all the illegal and even murderous excesses committed by your soldiery and butchers ? Could you not admit that the whole affair was brought about by acts of our tyrannical, corrupt, and unjust local government? ... What is this country else than Australia? Is it any more England than it is Ireland or Scotland, France or America, Italy or Germany ? Is the population, wealth, intelligence, enterprise and learning wholly and solely English ? ... No, the population of Australia is not English but Australian, and sui generis. Any one who immigrates into this country, no matter from what clime or of what people, and contributes towards the development of its resources and its wealth, is no longer a foreigner ... The latest immigrant is the youngest Australian

The Geelong Advertiser commented that "The Ballarat Times contains ... a manifesto from Mrs Seekamp ... startling in its tone ... and the free use of the words sedition, liberty and oppression" and hoped for a "lenient sentence upon Mr Seekamp and a quick return to his editorial duties" to relieve the "dangerous influence of a free press petticoat government"

She protested her husband's sentence, amassing 3000 signatures for a petition to have him freed, and due to public outcry Henry was released after only 3 months. Before he could return, on 1 March she and a guest were held at gunpoint and robbed by a former employee while tallying up the newspapers accounts. The thieves escaped with almost 100 pounds, but were later arrested and jailed after Clara gave evidence.

== Later life ==
Henry was not well after being released from jail, and his poor health led to the eventual sale of the Ballarat Times in late 1856. Clara's daughter, now seven, had travelled from Ireland, and joined the family. The government, wanting to expand the road the Ballarat Times was situated on, compulsorily acquired portions of the land in 1856 and 1859. Clara petitioned for money from the government to make up for her loss of business income and property value; after many delays the government eventually awarded her 500 pounds in 1862. Whether Clara and Henry were still living together is not clear. He appears to have been in New South Wales in 1860, and Queensland at some point in 1862. He died there in January 1864. Clara and her three children had moved to Melbourne.

In 1868 her daughter Clara died from diphtheria at the age of 18, and later that year her son Oliver was arrested for stealing building materials from empty houses. She is reported as appearing in court "much grieved with her son's position" and offered that "his name was down for a situation in the General Post Office" in his defence. She wrote a letter asking for financial help from the Victorian Press Association in 1873, and a letter of correction to The Age confirming her former husband's status as founder of The Ballarat Times in 1877. Oliver died of lead poisoning in 1884.

Clara herself died in Pascoe Vale, Melbourne at her son Francis' house on 22 January 1908. She is buried with Oliver in Melbourne General Cemetery.
