= Henry Seekamp =

Australian journalist (1829-1864)

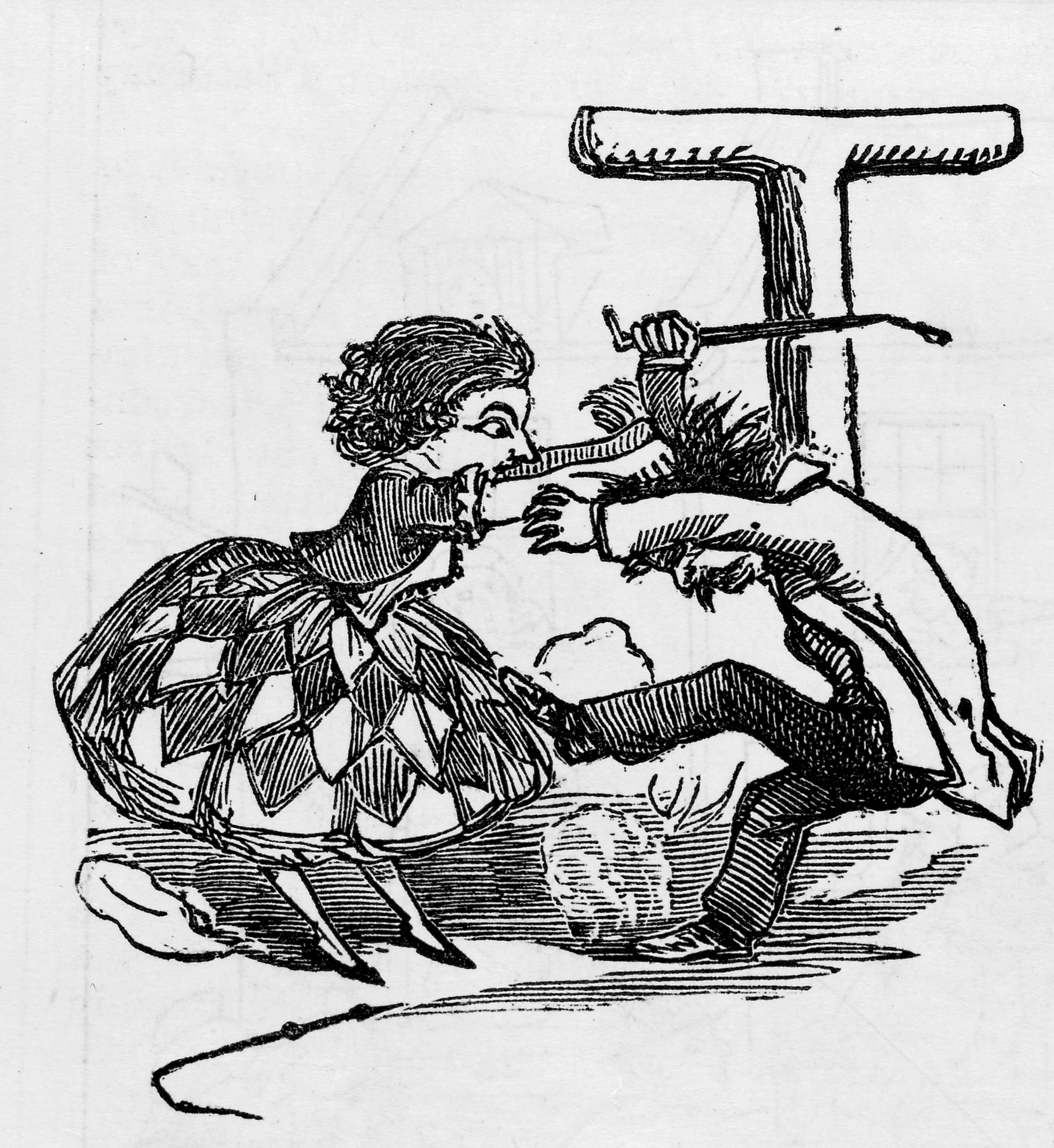
- Lola Montez and Henry Seekamp as published in Melbourne Punch,1856
- Born: 1829; England
- Died: 19 January 1864 (aged 34–35); Clermont, Queensland
- Occupation: Australian journalist
- Known for: Seditious libel

Henry Erle Seekamp (1829 - 19 January 1864) was a journalist, owner and editor of the Ballarat Times during the 1854 Eureka Rebellion in Victoria, Australia. The newspaper was fiercely pro-miner, and he was responsible for a series of articles and several editorials that supported the Ballarat Reform League while condemning the government and police harassment of the diggers. After the Rebellion was put down, he was charged, found guilty of seditious libel, and imprisoned, becoming the only participant to receive gaol time.

After an embarrassingly public squabble with visiting actress Lola Montez and the court case that resulted from it, he sold The Times and left Ballarat.

He died eight years later, aged only 35.

== Life ==
Seekamp is thought to have been born in 1829 in London, England, however some historians point to his surname being of German origin. After achieving a degree in Bachelor of Arts from an unknown university, and arriving in Victoria in 1852, he had reached the Ballarat goldfields by 1853. He tried prospecting for gold, presumably meeting with some success as he was able to afford a printing press and the not inconsiderable cost of its transport to Ballarat in 1854. During December 1853 he began living with another recent arrival, Irish born actress Clara Maria Duvall. She and two of her three children adopted his surname, but there is no record of a marriage. The Ballarat Times was run in their household, on Bakery Hill, close to Gravel Pits. The newspaper was successful, more land was purchased, and the small house they started with grew into a collection of buildings consisting of a printing office, stables, kitchen, separate residence, office and coach-house.

He served as secretary to the committee that planned to build a hospital for the miners of Ballarat, and was a great supporter of The Ballarat Reform League in their lobbying to improve conditions for the men working at the diggings.

He was also responsible for printing the Ballarat Reform Charter and the many flyers advertising speakers and dates for the "monster meetings" organising support prior to the rebellion.

His fellow rebel, Raffaello Carboni described him as "a short, thick, rare sort of man, of quick and precise movements, sardonic countenance; and one look from his sharp round set of eyes, tells you at once that you must not trifle with him" commenting that he was; "Of a temper that must have cost him some pains to keep under control, he hates humbug and all sort of yabber-yabber".

== Writings ==
red coats [ie.soldiers] in the Camp rushed in to gaze on this wild elephant, whose trunk it was supposed, had stirred up the hell on Ballaarat... his energy was never abated, though the whole legion of Victorian red-tape wanted to dry his inkstand, and smother his lamp in gaol. That there are too many fools at large, he knows... what he can not put up with, is their royal cant, religious bosh, Toorak small-beer, and first and foremost, their money-grubbing expertness. Hence, now and then, his ink turns sour, and thereby its vitriol burns stronger.

— Rafaello Carboni, describing Seekamp's arrival after his arrest

At first Seekamp was hopeful of change from new Victorian Governor Sir Charles Hotham, who had told the miners he would not neglect their interests, and wrote an approving editorial after the Governors visit to the goldfields. But by September 1854 he was suggesting that despite protestations, Hotham had secretly ordered the police to invigorate the search for unlicensed miners. (Ballarat Times, 30 September 1854)

In increasingly strident editorial tone the four-page weekly broadsheet newspaper criticised the Government and supported the diggers movement. On the Ballarat reform movement Seekamp wrote:

"This league is nothing more or less than the germ of Australian independence. The die is cast, and fate has cast upon the movement its indelible signature. No power on earth can now restrain the united might and headlong strides for freedom of the people of this country ... The League has undertaken a mighty task, fit only for a great people – that of changing the dynasty of the country." (Ballarat Times 18 November 1854).

His writing has been described as "flowery", to the point of causing some courtroom amusement at police difficulty in translating what they actually considered "sedition" from the somewhat florid language, but Geoffrey Blainey considers that while "extravagant at times... many of his sentences were compelling, eloquent and even pithy."

Much later in life, Clara Seekamp was quoted as saying "If Peter Lalor was the sword of the movement, my husband was the pen."

== Arrest and trial ==
On the day after the massacre at the Eureka Stockade, on 4 December 1854, Governor Hotham declared Martial law in Ballarat. Seekamp was arrested in his office, all copies of the newspaper were confiscated, and he was charged with sedition for a series of articles published in the Ballarat Times. The articles may actually have been written by George Lang, son of prominent politician the Reverend John Dunmore Lang, or James Manning; historian Clare Wright theorises that his wife Clara may have been the author. Certainly Seekamp claimed that he had not written them, and had been away from Ballarat on business when they were printed as part of his defence. He was tried and convicted of seditious libel on 23 January 1855, after the judge directed the jury that as a point of law, an editor was liable for the contents of his newspaper and stated that in his opinion, the articles were seditious. After a series of appeals, the Chief Justice, Sir William à Beckett, sentenced him to six months imprisonment on 23 March 1855. The thirteen men brought to trial after him were found either not guilty, or had their charges dropped. He was released from prison on 28 June 1855, three months early, after public outcry and a 3,000 signature petition organised by Clara Seekamp. He was the only man to spend time in prison as a result of actions during the rebellion.

During his imprisonment, his wife took over the editorial duties on the newspaper and proved similarly outspoken. He returned to Ballarat after he was released and continued to edit the Ballarat Times.

== Later life ==
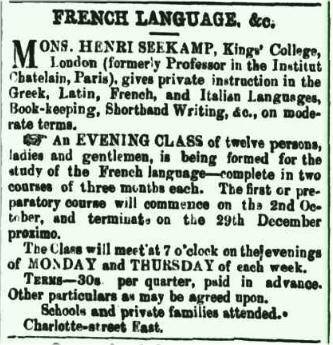
Seekamp's advertisement in The Courier in 1862

In 1856 Seekamp wrote a scathing review in the Ballarat Times of visiting actress Lola Montez and her erotic Spider Dance, criticising her for immorality. After taunting him onstage, Montez accosted him while he was drinking at a local hotel, chasing and beating him with her riding whip; Seekamp responded in kind, and the pair had to be separated by onlookers. Montez sued him for slander, and he sued her for assault. Both of these claims were dismissed, but Mr. Lewis, solicitor to Montez, personally sued for libel and was awarded 100 pounds. This widely publicised, embarrassing incident and the consequent loss of popularity combined with Seekamp's failing health, led to the final sale of the Ballarat Times in October 1856. Although present at the 2nd-anniversary celebrations of the Eureka Stockade in 1856, by 1860 he was editor of The Telegraph in Twofold Bay, although that position ended in charges of embezzlement which were later dismissed. Seekamp eventually moved to Brisbane, where he advertised under the name "Mons. Henri Seekamp, formerly Professor in the Institut Chatelain, Paris" as a French language teacher in 1862. Clara and the children remained in Melbourne.

He died of "natural causes accelerated by intemperance" at the Clermont gold diggings in Queensland on 19 January 1864, at the age of 35.

He was inducted into the Melbourne Press Club's Hall of Fame in 2012.

== See also ==
- Eureka Rebellion
- Australian sedition law
- Ballarat
