= De Hotham =

de Hotham is a surname. Notable people with the surname include:

- John de Hotham (died 1361), English medieval university chancellor
- Thomas de Hotham (fl. 1320s), English medieval university chancellor

== See also ==
- Hotham (disambiguation)
