= James Scobie =

Australian murder victim

- Born: 29 November 1826
- Died: 7 October 1854 (aged 27); Ballarat, Victoria, Australia

James Scobie (29 November 1826 – 7 October 1854) was a Scottish gold digger murdered at Ballarat, Victoria, Australia. His death was associated with a following of events which led to the Eureka Rebellion.

At the later Supreme Court trial in Melbourne, gold-miner Peter Martin gave eyewitness testimony regarding the death, as published in Bell's Life in Sydney and Sporting Reviewer. He stated that he and Scobie went to Bentley's Hotel "to get something to drink", but found "the house was shut up". When Scobie went up to one of the front windows, a hand broke through the window and struck him. Scobie then tried to get into the hotel, but Martin managed to get him to go "100 or 150 yards" away in the direction of Scobie's tent. Some men and a woman followed the pair. The woman told the men that Scobie had broken the window. Martin was knocked down, and one of the men struck Scobie with what Martin thought "resembled a battle-axe". Martin fetched a doctor, but Scobie was already dead.

An inquest into Scobie's death was held the same afternoon. At the inquest, the hotel keeper, James Bentley, and his staff denied taking part in the death, despite a sound case against them. The magistrate found that there was not enough evidence against Bentley and as a result the matter was adjourned.

Miners felt that justice had not been served and made a plan. The diggers had a meeting that grew out of control and ended with a riot outside Bentley's Hotel. This resulted in it burning to the ground on 17 October because of the miners' anger. Three men were arrested, and extra troops were sent from Melbourne.

These actions caused more frequent license inspections, and with rumours of the death of a drummer boy, soldiers were pelted with rocks and more arrests were made.

A petition was sent to His Excellency Sir Charles Hotham, Lieutenant-Governor of the Colony of Victoria regarding the investigation of the death of James Scobie. New evidence came to light and a trial was held in Melbourne's Supreme Court commencing 18 November: Queen v. James Francis Bentley, Catherine Bentley, William Henry Hance and Thomas Farrell in the murder of James Scobie. Judge Redmond Barry presided over the case. James Bentley, William Hance and Thomas Farrell were all found guilty of manslaughter and were each sentenced on 20 November to three years hard labour on the roads; Catherine Bentley was found not guilty.

On the afternoon of 20 November, Judge Barry presided over the trial of the Bentley's Hotel rioters. Thomas Fletcher, Andrew McIntyre, and Henry Westerly were respectively sentenced to three, four, and six months imprisonment.

Scobie's death and the acquittal of the hotel keeper at the inquest were part of the catalyst of the events leading to the Eureka Rebellion.

Scobie is buried in the Ballarat Old Cemetery. His grave is marked by a broken column, a symbol of a life cut short.

He was a character in the 1949 film Eureka Stockade.
