= John Lutterell =

English philosopher, theologian and university chancellor

John Lutterell (died 1335) was an English medieval philosopher, theologian, and university chancellor.

Lutterell was a Dominican and a Canon of Salisbury Cathedral. He was Chancellor of Oxford University from 1317 to 1322. However, he was so disliked by the regent masters at Oxford that he was expelled as Chancellor there.

John Lutterell went to Avignon in 1323 where he hoped to advance his career at the papal court. He carried with him a booklet of 56 errors taken from a commentary on the Sentences of Peter Lombard by William of Ockham. Lutterell presented this to Pope John XXII. Lutterell may have been given the task of compiling a report on Ockham's views. Even though he was a Doctor of Theology, he demonstrated a poor understanding of Ockham's ideas. As a result, the papal commission appointed to examine Ockham was forced to revise the list of 56 errors prior to beginning its own inquiry.

Lutterell believed that a reality (God's essence) can have rational differences (ideas). Opposing Ockham, he argued that these ideas cannot be created things. Instead these ideas are eternal and immutable, but creatures are not. Ockham was questioned by Lutterell and five other theologians. They found difficulties with the young friar's ideas. He was not condemned formally but was forced to remain in Avignon under a type of house arrest.

Lutterell appears in the story “Thus We Frustrate Charlemagne” by R.A. Lafferty, in which a cabal of scientists manipulating time cause a catastrophe by killing him before he reaches Avignon.

Academic offices
Preceded by Richard de Nottingham? or Henry Harclay	Chancellor of the University of Oxford; 1317–1322	Succeeded by Henry Gower
