= William de Alburwyke =

English singer and university chancellor

William de Alburwyke was an English medieval singer, college fellow, and university chancellor.

William de Alburwyke was chantor of York in northern England. He was also at Merton College, Oxford and a Doctor of Divinity. He was Principal of Broadgates Hall, which later became Pembroke College, Oxford. Between 1324 and 1326, he was Chancellor of the University of Oxford.

Academic offices
Preceded by Henry Gower	Chancellor of the University of Oxford; 1324–1326	Succeeded by Thomas Hotham
