= HMS Hotham =

HMS Hotham may refer to more than one ship of the British Royal Navy:

- HMS Bahamas (K503), a frigate in commission from 1943 to 1946 briefly named Hotham while under construction in 1943
- HMS Hotham (K583), a frigate which served in the Royal Navy from 1944 to 1956
