= Henry Gower =

British bishop

Henry Gower (or Henry de Gower) was a medieval canon lawyer, college fellow, university chancellor, and bishop.

Gower was a Fellow of Merton College, Oxford in England and Chancellor of the University of Oxford during 1322–24. He was a professor of canon law. He was briefly Archdeacon of St David's in Wales before becoming Bishop of St David's from 1328 to 1347.

== See also ==
- Gower in Wales

Academic offices
Preceded by John Lutterell	Chancellor of the University of Oxford; 1322–1324	Succeeded by William de Alburwyke
Catholic Church titles
Preceded by David Martyn	Bishop of St David's; 1328–1347	Succeeded by John of Thoresby
