= USS Hotham =

USS Hotham may refer to more than one United States Navy ship:

- USS Hotham (PF-75), a patrol frigate transferred to the United Kingdom while under construction which served in the Royal Navy as HMS Bahamas (K503) from 1943 to 1946
- USS Hotham (DE-574), a destroyer escort transferred to the United Kingdom while under construction which served in the Royal Navy as the frigate HMS Hotham (K583) from 1944 to 1952
