= Twofold Bay Telegraph =

Front page of the Twofold Bay Telegraph, 19 October 1860

The Twofold Bay Telegraph, also published as the Twofold Bay and Maneroo Telegraph, was a weekly English language newspaper published in Eden, New South Wales, Australia.

== History ==
The paper was originally published as the Twofold Bay and Maneroo Telegraph, also known as The Two Fold Bay Telegraph. It was issued under this title for approximately 6 months until 16 October 1860. On 19 October 1860, the title changed The Twofold Bay Telegraph. The paper ceased publication 28 December 1860.

== Digitisation ==
The Twofold Bay Telegraph has been digitised as part of the Australian Newspapers Digitisation Program of the National Library of Australia.

== See also ==
- List of newspapers in New South Wales
