= Ballarat Reform League =

The Ballarat Reform League came into being in October 1853 and was officially constituted on 11 November 1854 at a mass meeting of miners in Ballarat, Victoria to protest against the Victorian government's mining policy and administration of the goldfields.

As with the Bendigo protests the previous year (the Red Ribbon Rebellion), the primary objective of the League was to oppose the Miner's Licence. The League also strove for justice for James Scobie, a Scottish miner who had recently been murdered outside Bentley's Hotel in Eureka, and for the release of three miners who had been wrongly imprisoned for burning down the hotel.

John Basson Humffray was elected secretary of the League. He urged civil disobedience to resist the government. But, when tensions boiled over on 30 November 1854, his pacifist strategy was overturned and the miners opted to use arms to fight the authorities. The miners elected Peter Lalor as their commander, although he had no military experience. Lalor led them to build the Eureka Stockade on 2 December 1854 and to use weapons to defend themselves against the military force sent to quell them on 3 December 1854.

The actions of the League were reported in sensational and inflammatory terms by Henry Seekamp, editor and owner of the local newspaper, the Ballarat Times, Buningyog and Creswick Advertiser. Propaganda such as posters calling meetings was also printed by Seekamp's office.

== Precursors ==
The leaders of the Ballarat Reform League used the models of many recent protest movements to shape their organization and prepare their petition.

As shown on the web site of the Museum of Australian Democracy, Milestones in Australian Democracy these precursors included the following:

- 1837-1848: the British Chartists, who produced the first of four People’s Charters in 1838
- 1848: various European revolutions
- 1848: the NSW Constitutional Association
- 1850: the Australian League

Additional inspiration for the League came from nationwide debate about Electoral reform: the new Victorian Legislative Council that first met on 11 July 1851, would eventually (in 1856) include in the Victorian Constitution the introduction of the secret ballot, as pioneered in Victoria by the former mayor of Melbourne, William Nicholson and simultaneously in South Australia by William Boothby.

In 1853, perhaps the most direct influence on the League was the Anti-Gold Licence Association that had been formed in another Victorian goldfield, Bendigo, on 6 June. The Association's protests became known as the Red Ribbon Rebellion, since at the public meetings in June and July the thousands of miners who gathered all wore red ribbons in their hats, to highlight their solidarity.

The Anti-Gold Licence Association prepared a petition that was endorsed by more than 20,000 people from Bendigo and surrounding goldfields such as Castlemaine and Ballarat. La Trobe was presented with the document on 1 August 1853. As stated in the copy of the manuscript shown on the eGold web site, at its heart were six claims for improved conditions.

It requested the government:

First: To direct that the Licence Fee be reduced to Ten Shillings a Month

Secondly: To direct that Monthly or Quarterly Licenses be issued at the option of the Applicants

Thirdly: To direct that new arrivals or invalids be allowed on registering their names at the Commissioners Office fifteen clear days residence on the Gold Fields before the License be enforced

Fourthly: To afford greater facility to Diggers and others resident on the Gold Fields who wish to engage in Agricultural Pursuits for investing their earnings in small allotments of land

Fifthly: To direct that the Penalty of Five Pounds for non-possession of License be reduced to One Pound

Sixthly: To direct that (as the Diggers and other residents on the Gold Fields of the Colony have uniformly developed a love of law and order) the sending of an Armed Force to enforce the License Tax be discontinued.

(eGold, The Bendigo Goldfields Petition 1853)

Fourteen months later, the Ballarat Reform League's Charter resembled the Bendigo Petition in its demands concerning miners' rights. The documents differ in that the Petition begins with a clear statement of the problems caused by the lack of rights, whereas the Charter opens with aspirational statements about universal political equality; and the Petition avowed loyalty to Britain, whilst the Charter openly threatened the seizure of independence.

== Leaders of the Ballarat Reform League ==
Wright, reporting in the Canberra Times in 1953, for the centenerary of the rebellion, describes the main characters in the story:

George Black, a well-educated Englishman was editor of the "Digger's Advocate." Through his paper he worked to form the diggers into a cohesive group which would resist oppressive laws.

A Welshman, John Basson Humffray, took the conservative view and believed the solution should be gained by constitutional means.

Frederic Vern, a Hanoverian, was full of fine talk about righting wrongs and because of the noise he made, was wrongly believed by the Government to be directing the forces.

But the man who held the loyalty of the diggers was Peter Lalor, an Irish engineer. Because of his courage and integrity he was a man whom other men would follow loyally.

The most picturesque personality among the leaders was an Italian, Raffaello Carboni, and it is to his dynamic and emotional narrative that we owe much of the detail of those bitter days.

The sixth man, Timothy Hayes, was an Irishman and a rousing speaker.

(Canberra Times, 29 November 1953, p. 4)

On the other hand, Hocking lists the leaders of the League as:

Henry Holyoake, a London chartist

George Black, a well-educated Englishman who published the Diggers Advocate

The more moderate Welshman J B Humffray

The German Frederick Vern who promoted ‘red republicanism'

Tom Kennedy, the Scottish chartist, was in favour of direct and physical action

(Hocking p. 170)

== The Charter ==
The manifesto of the Ballarat Reform League can be seen in its original manuscript form, and in transcription, at the Public Records Office of Victoria (PROV) in Melbourne, from where it is also available online.

It has come to be known as the Ballarat Reform League Charter, but at the time of writing the document was labeled by its writers as 27 Nov. 1854 Resolutions passed at a Public Meeting on Bakery Hill Ballarat. Within the document it refers to itself as "this prospectus". It is often unclear because:

- unlike its predecessor the Bendigo Petition, the Charter suffers from a loss of focus, veering from minor practical demands, such as a tent for administration premises, to grandiose threats that the colony will secede from Britain and the rule of Queen Victoria.

- the document is written in quasi-legal terminology and is sometimes illogical, with such statements as "the Reform League will endeavor to supersede such Royal Prerogative by asserting that of the People which is the most Royal of all Prerogatives".

- whilst claiming to express the "principles and objects" of the Ballarat Reform League, it soon becomes way-laid with cavilling at the authorities.

Despite these flaws, the Charter has enjoyed a glowing reputation ever since Seekamp's claim in the Ballarat Times of 18 November 1854, that the League was "nothing more or less than the germ of Australian independence" that would "change the dynasty of this country".

One of the aspirational statements made in the Charter lists "Political changes contemplated by the Reform League: 1. A full and fair representation 2. Manhood suffrage 3. No property qualification of Members for the Legislative Council. 4. Payment of Members 5. Short duration of Parliament." (Page 2 of Charter) These points are a re-statement of five of the six points of the British Chartists People's Charter 1838, whose sixth point, the secret ballot, is not mentioned in the Ballarat Reform League's Charter. These demands were preceded by a preamble indicating the Ballarat league's "object" was to replace "paid Officials" who made the law to suit "their selfish ends and narrow views," and to instead place power in the hands of "responsible representatives of the people."

In summary the Charter consists of three sections with the following components:

Ultimate goals: responsible government, the right to vote to be given to all men, parliamentary terms to be shortened, members of parliament to be paid and to be able to stand for election regardless of property ownership

Immediate demands: Commissioners of the Gold Fields Commission to be sacked; licences for gold diggers and storekeepers to be discontinued; the Reform League to be given premises (a tent) and administrative authority

Additional complaints: censure of the disrespectful attitude of officials of the Gold Fields Commission; mistrust of politicians in Parliament; disapproval of the process establishing the Board of Enquiry

== Contemporary views of the League ==
Contemporary historians such as O'Lincoln and Headon and Uhr caution against the romanticism and the cult status that have frequently been attached to Eureka and its leaders. Headon and Uhr take as examples works by poets, playwrights and fiction writers, such as Henry Lawson’s poem of 1889, Eureka, Leslie Haylen’s play Blood on the wattle, of 1948, and Henry Handel Richardson's The Fortunes of Richard Mahony: Australia Felix of 1917. They also note that politicians from the left as well as the right have not hesitated to mould the story to suit their ideologies.

According to Hocking, it was not idealism but the exhaustion of Eureka's alluvial gold, amenable to their methods of deep mining, that drove the miners to desperate measures.

While there certainly were many disaffected diggers who did harbour truly revolutionary ideals, for most their resistance was rooted in economic reality and a distaste for arbitrary and perverse ‘justice’. (Hocking, p. 162)

Manning Clark (1999, p.136) condemned the excessive reverence given to Eureka as being "the great Australian illusion".

Geoffrey Blainey acknowledges that "we all barrack for Ballarat, we sympathise with the miners, and see largely through their spectacles" (Baliney, 1998, p. 18.) but he says that this partiality can cause us to manipulate the story and "make history do its handsprings"

Reinforcing the point that the Ballarat Reform League was important but not seminal, Blainey adds

The incentives and fears promoting democracy in Australia were already high before the Eureka Stockade quickened the movement towards popular control of Victoria’s new parliament. (Baliney, 2016, p. 18)

== List of notable Ballarat Reform League members ==
| Name | Birth year | Birthplace | Position | Legacy and notes | Ref(s) |
|---|---|---|---|---|---|
| George Black | | | | | |
| Timothy Hayes | | | | | |
| Henry Holyoake | | | | | |
| John Basson Humffray | | | | | |
| Thomas Kennedy | | | | | |
| Peter Lalor | | | | | |
| Henry Nicholls | | | | | |
| Frederick Vern | | | | | |

== Gallery ==
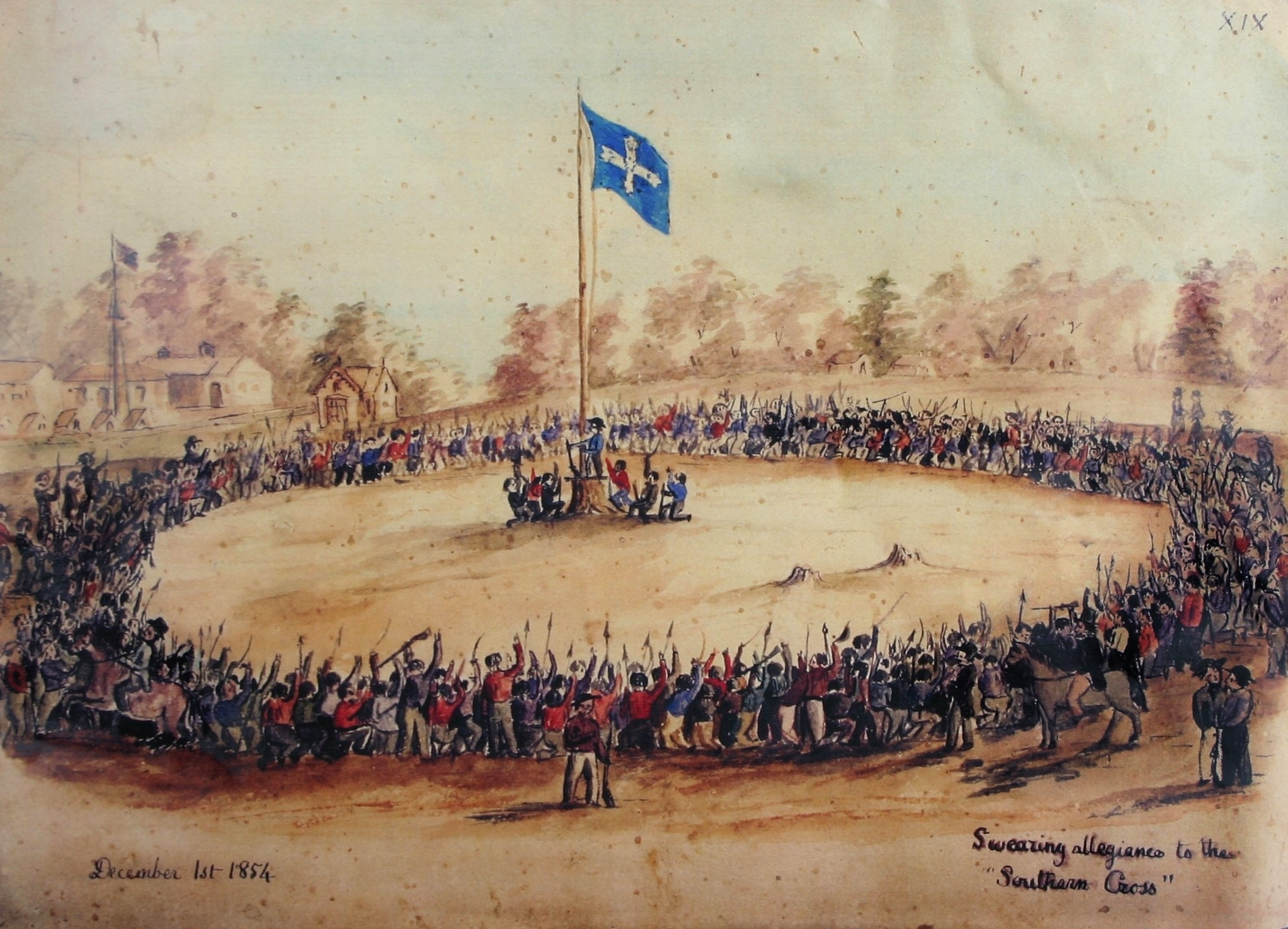
Swearing allegiance to the Southern Cross flag

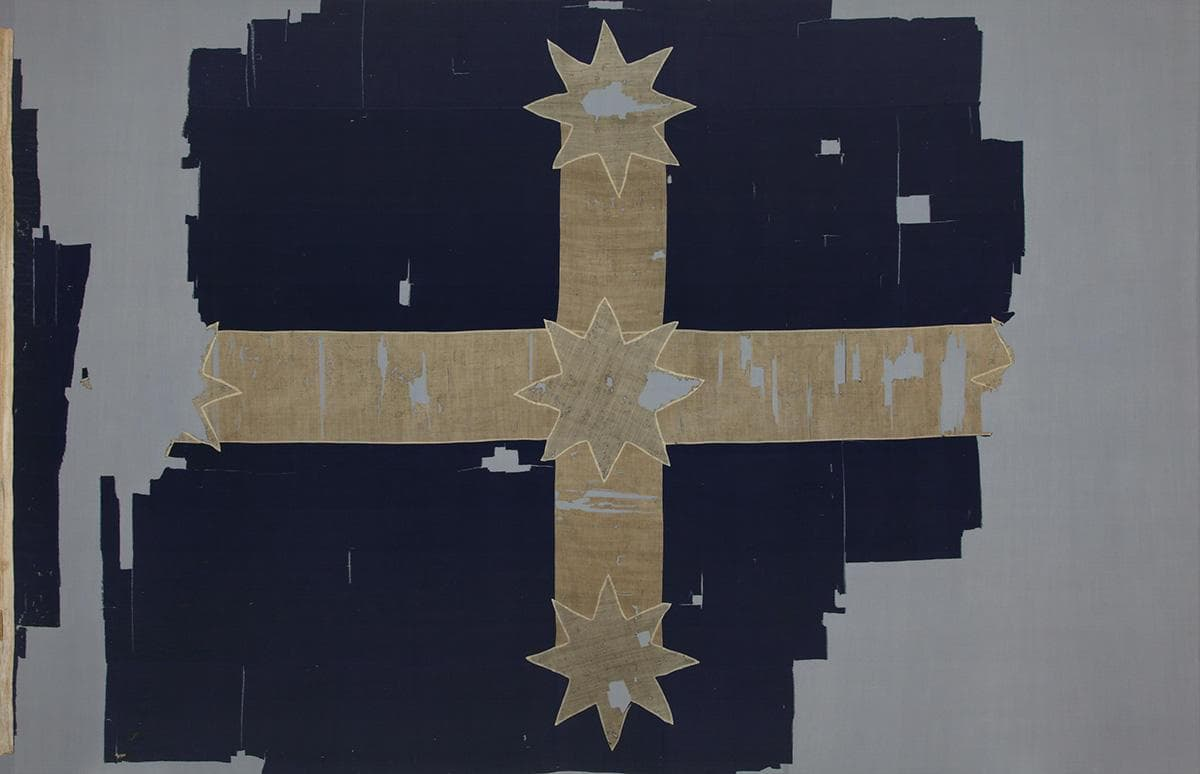
The original Eureka flag - the Southern Cross

Replica of the Eureka flag

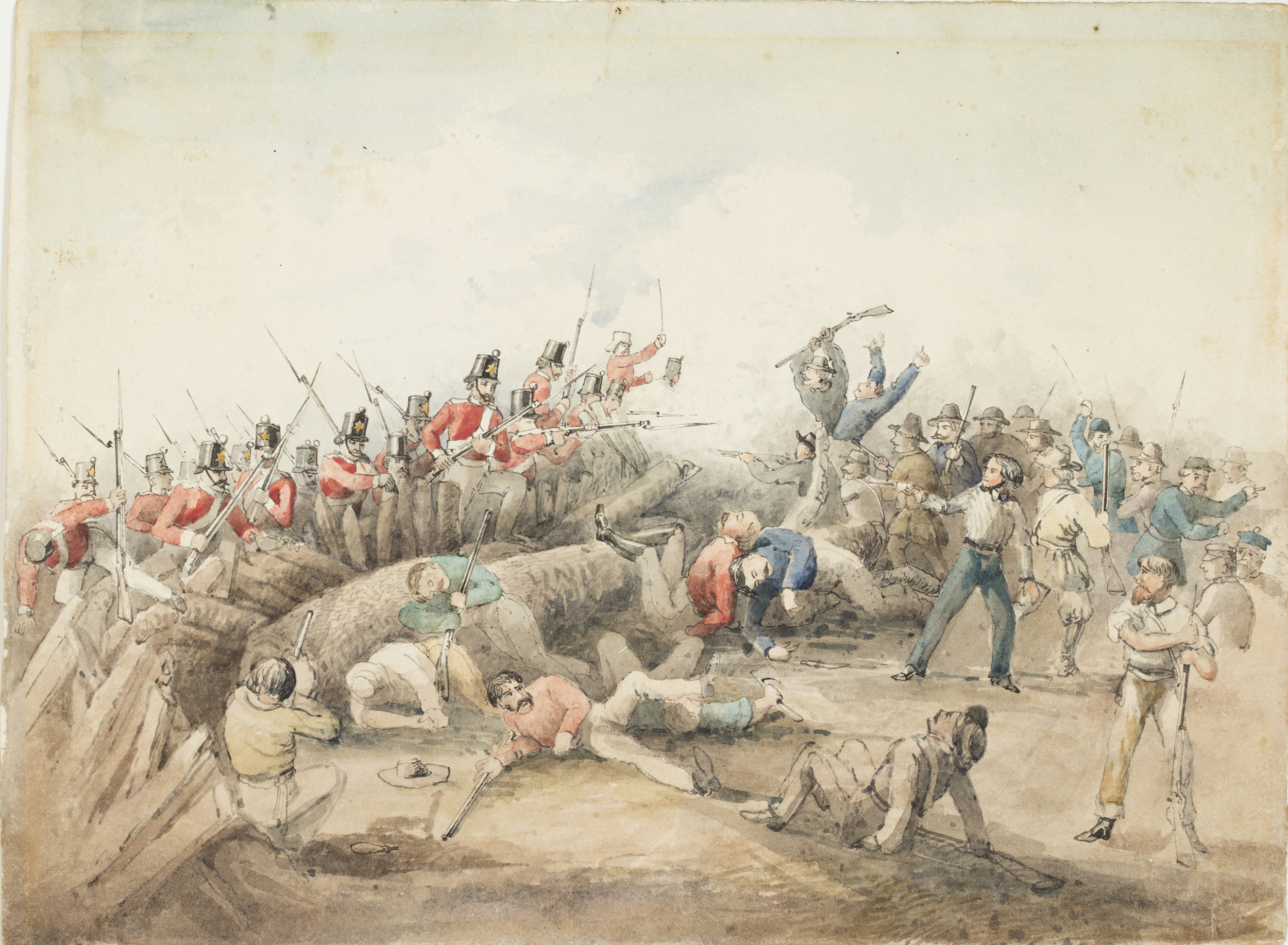
The Eureka stockade battle in progress

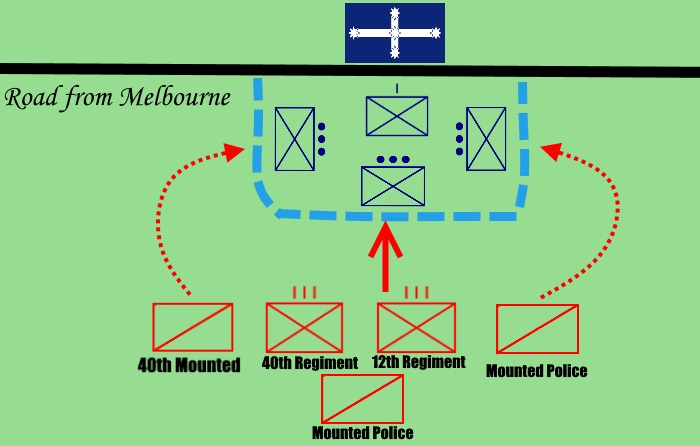
Map of the battle at the stockade

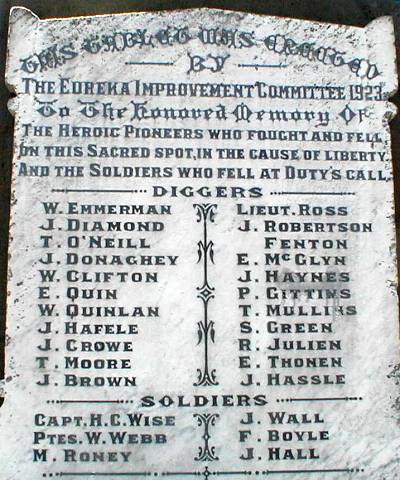
Memorial to those killed in the Eureka stockade

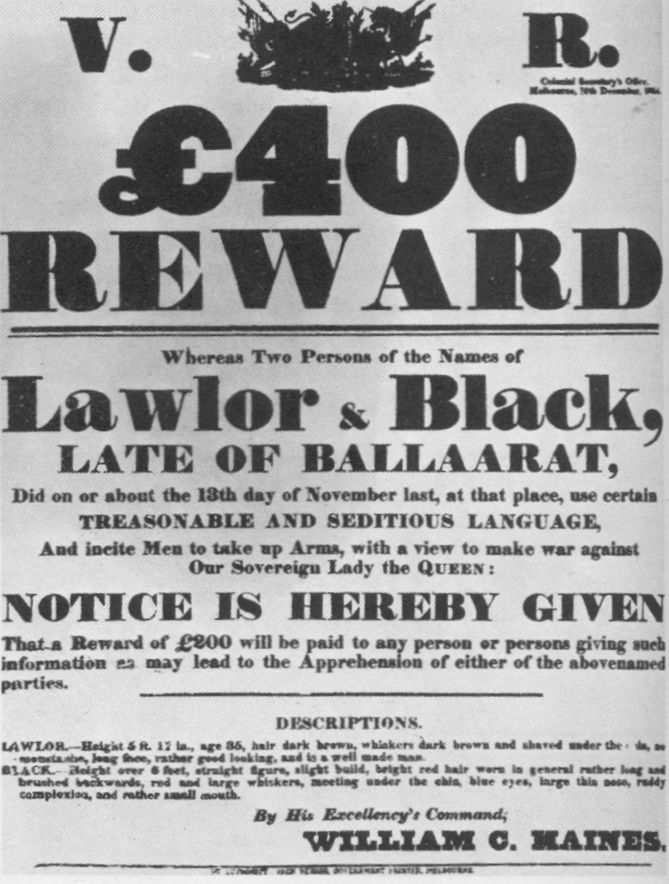
Reward for the capture of Lalor and Black

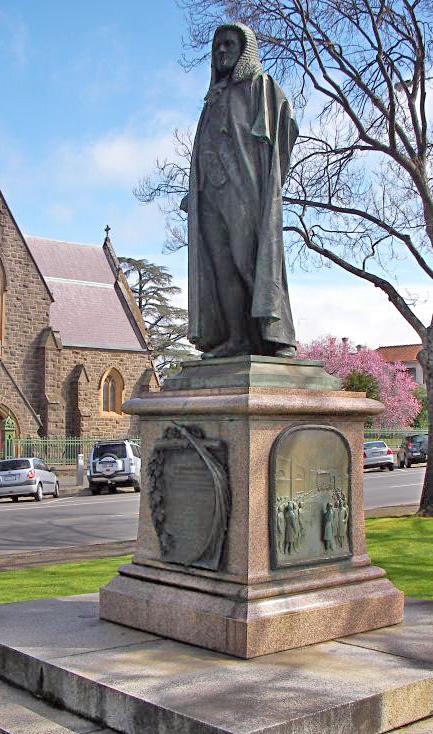
Statue of Lalor in Ballarat

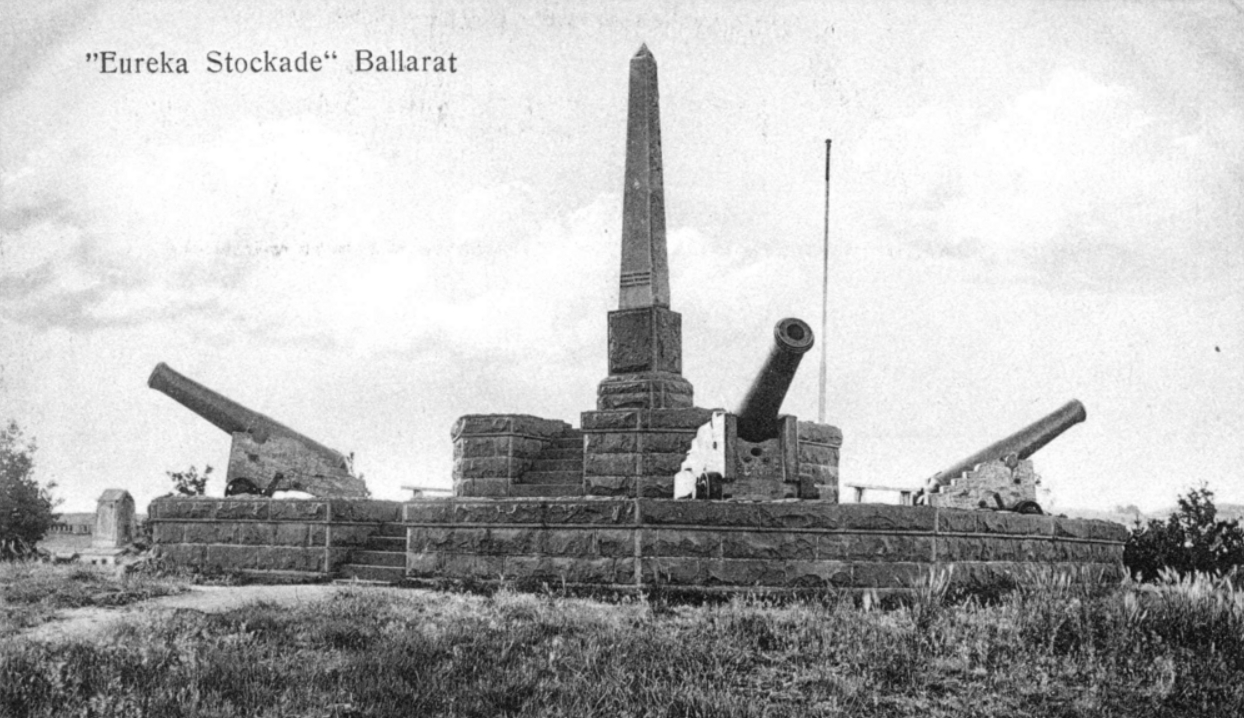
Eureka Rebellion Monument, in 1911

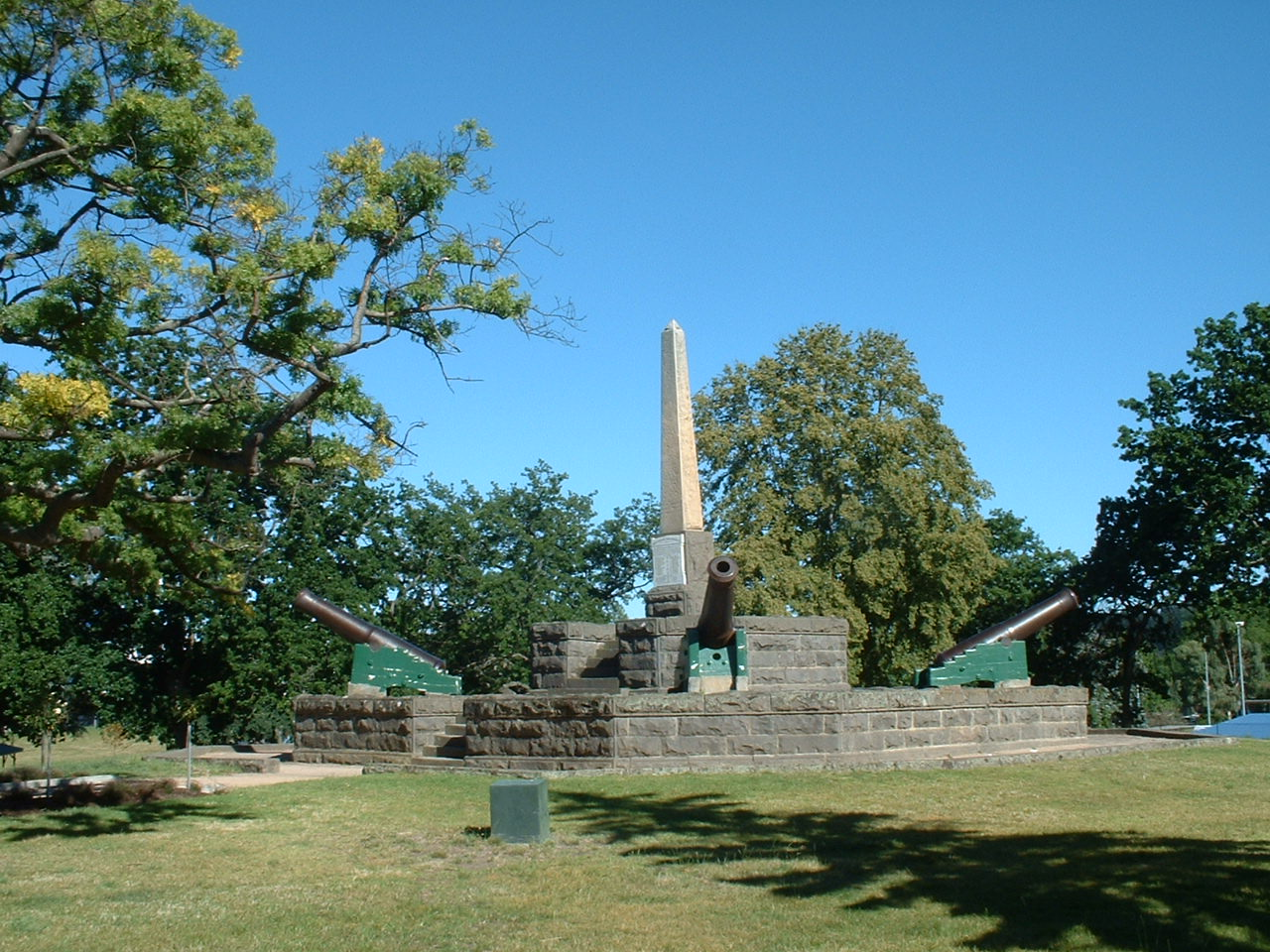
Eureka Rebellion Monument, in 2009

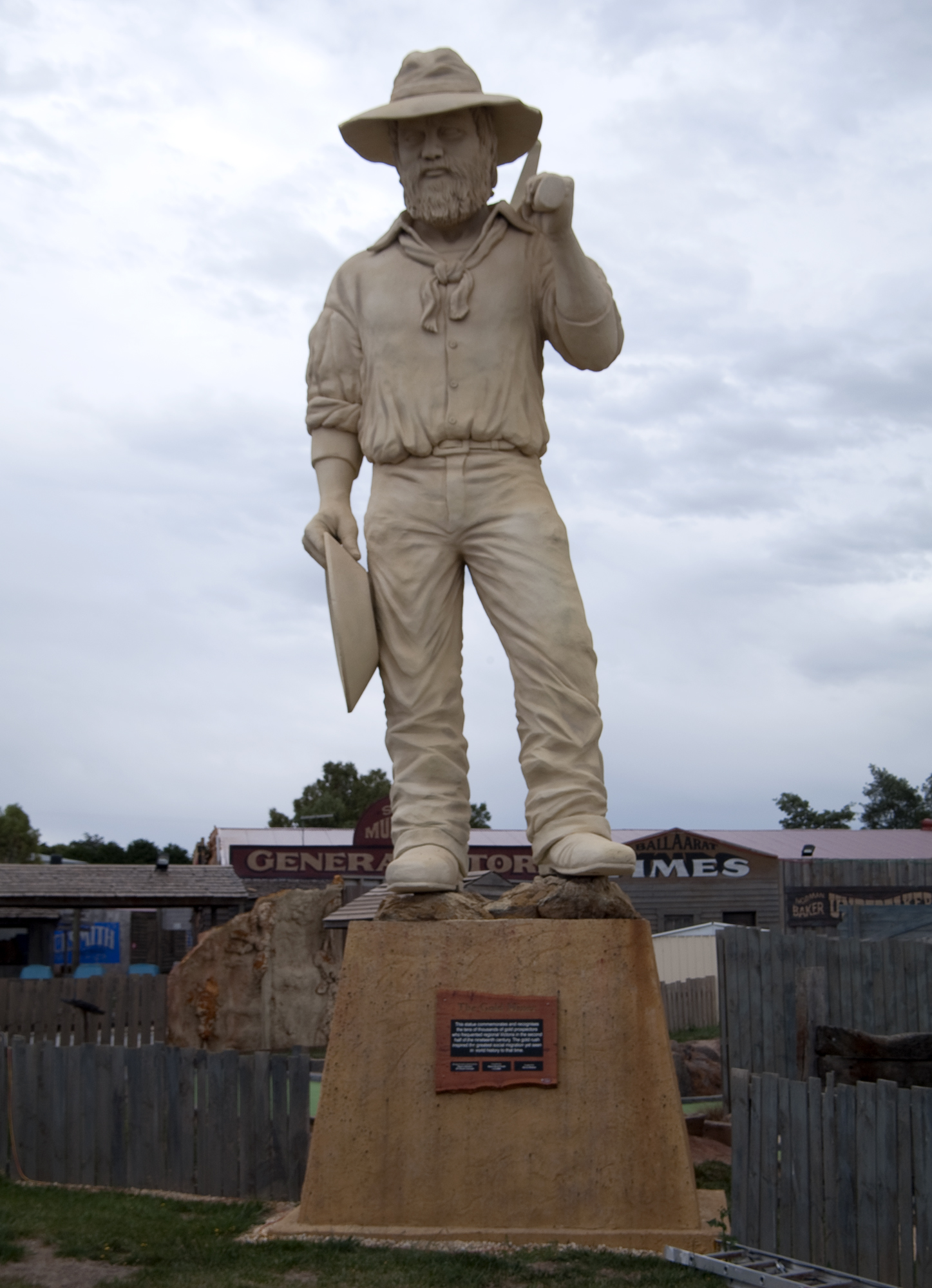
"The Big Miner", 2010

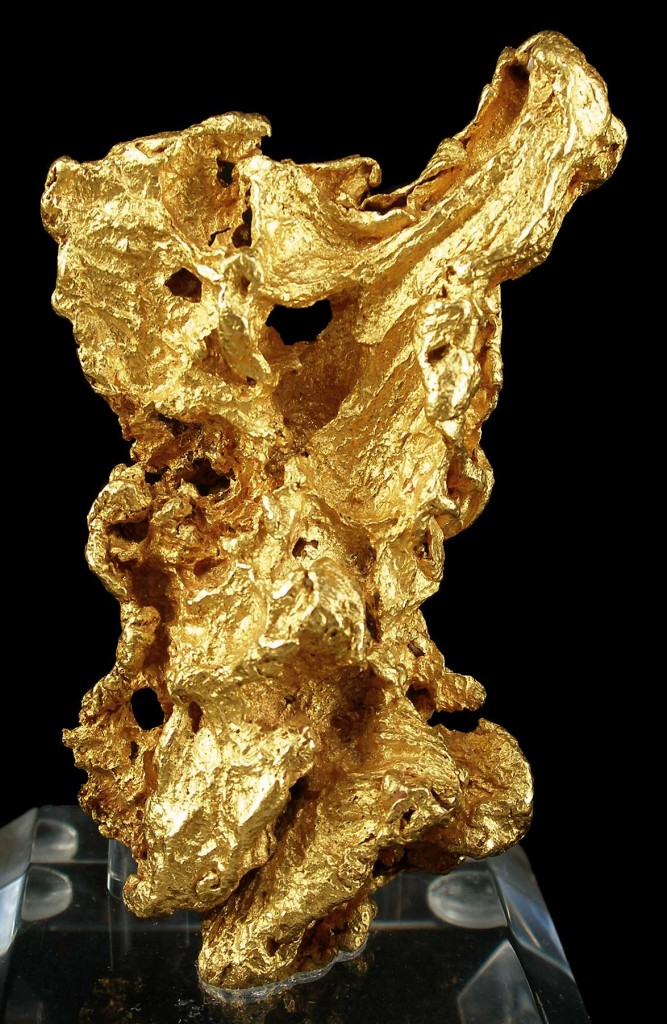
A famous nugget of Ballarat gold
