= Frederick Vern =

German leader in the Eureka Rebellion

Frederick Vern was a German who was one of the leaders in the Eureka Rebellion. He helped form the Ballarat Reform League. Vern went into hiding after the rebellion and spent a number of months on the run.

He was a character in the 1949 film Eureka Stockade.

== See also ==
- Bendigo Petition

== Bibliography ==
After the trials held in melbourne he came clean and served three months in prison.
