= Anti-Gold Licence Association =

1853–1854 organisation in Victoria

The Anti-Gold Licence Association, was formed in Bendigo, Victoria, Australia on 6 June 1853. The Association's protest became known as the Red Ribbon Rebellion, since at meetings in June and July thousands of miners gathered, wearing red ribbons around their hats, to show their solidarity in opposing the conditions imposed upon them by the government.

On 26 July 1853 Governor La Trobe was presented with a petition drawn up by the Association, and undersigned by more than 23,000 miners from the region.

The miners objected to the high miner's licence fee of 30 shillings per month, and resolved to pay only 10 shillings in licence fees and, if this was refused, to pay no more fees at all. All miners supporting the resolution would continue to wear red ribbons around their hats as a symbol of defiance.

In response to the agitation at Bendigo, all available military forces in the colony of Victoria were sent to the Bendigo gold field. At a meeting on 28 August 1853 shots were fired.

On 30 August 1853 Governor La Trobe appeared to accede to the demands when he announced the abolition of the licence system and its replacement by an export duty and a small registration fee.

But the Victorian Legislative Council rejected La Trobe's proposal and his promise was not enacted. The licence system continued until after the Eureka Rebellion on the Ballarat gold field caused the loss of life in December 1854, and led to the eventual reform of the government-imposed conditions for miners in 1855.
