= Thomas Hotham =

English university chancellor

Thomas Hotham DD (also de Hotham, Hothum, Hodham, and Hothun) was an English medieval university chancellor.

Hotham was a Doctor of Divinity at the University of Oxford. From 1326 to 1328, he was Chancellor of the University.

Academic offices
Preceded by William de Alburwyke	Chancellor of the University of Oxford; 1326–1328	Succeeded by Ralph of Shrewsbury
