= HMS Hotham (K583) =

Frigate of the Royal Navy

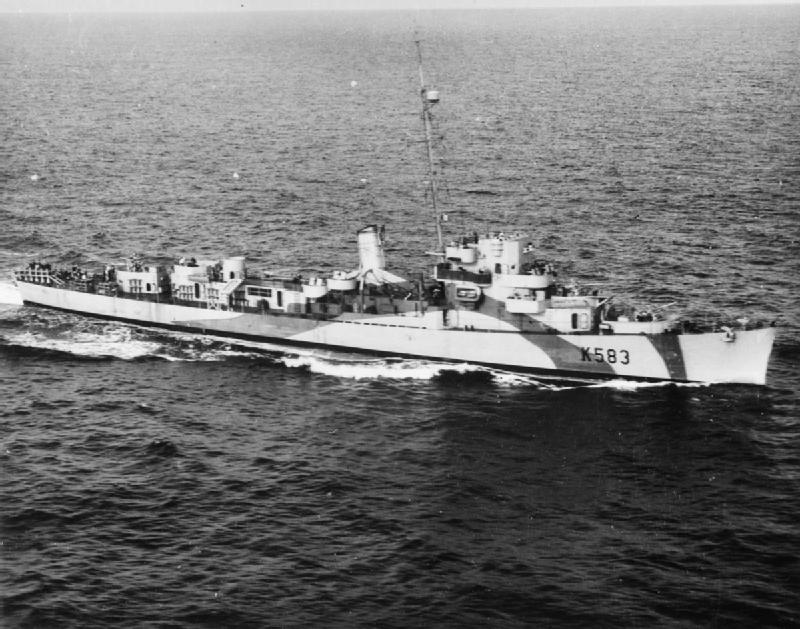
- HMS Hotham in February 1944, photographed by an aircraft operating from Royal Naval Air Station HMS Osprey, Dunoon, Scotland.

History

United States
- Name: unnamed (DE-574)
- Builder: Bethlehem-Hingham Shipyard, Hingham, Massachusetts
- Laid down: 5 November 1943
- Renamed: USS Hotham (DE-574) 1943
- Namesake: British name assigned in anticipation of transfer to United Kingdom
- Launched: 21 December 1943
- Completed: 8 February 1944
- Fate: Transferred to United Kingdom 8 February 1944
- Acquired: Nominally returned by United Kingdom 25 April 1952 under Lend-Lease
- Fate: Transferred back to United Kingdom 25 April 1952 under Mutual Defense Assistance Program
- Acquired: Returned to U.S. custody 13 March 1956
- Fate: Sold 1 November 1956 for scrapping

United Kingdom
- Name: HMS Hotham (K583)
- Namesake: Sir William Hotham
- Acquired: 8 February 1944
- Commissioned: 8 February 1944
- Identification: Pennant number K583
- Fate: Nominally returned to United States 25 April 1952 under Lend-Lease
- Acquired: Transferred back from United States 25 April 1952 under Mutual Defense Assistance Program
- Fate: Returned to U.S. custody 13 March 1956

General characteristics
- Displacement: 1,400 long tons (1,422 t)
- Length: 306 ft (93 m)
- Beam: 36.75 ft (11.2 m)
- Draught: 9 ft (2.7 m)
- Propulsion: Two Foster-Wheeler Express "D"-type water-tube boilers; GE 13,500 shp (10,070 kW) steam turbines and generators (9,200 kW); Electric motors for 12,000 shp (8,900 kW); Two shafts
- Speed: 24 knots (44 km/h)
- Range: 5,500 nautical miles (10,200 km) at 15 knots (28 km/h)
- Complement: 186
- Sensors & processing systems: SA & SL type radars; Type 144 series Asdic; MF Direction Finding antenna; HF Direction Finding Type FH 4 antenna
- Armament: 3 × 3 in (76 mm) /50 Mk.22 guns; 1 × twin Bofors 40 mm mount Mk.I; 7–16 × 20 mm Oerlikon guns; Mark 10 Hedgehog antisubmarine mortar; depth charges; QF 2-pounder naval gun

HMS Hotham (K583) was a Captain-class frigate of the Buckley class of destroyer escort, originally intended for the United States Navy. Before she was finished in 1944, she was transferred to the Royal Navy under the terms of Lend-Lease, and was in commission from 1944 to 1956, including service during World War II.

== Construction and transfer ==
The still-unnamed ship was laid down as the U.S. Navy destroyer escort DE-574 by Bethlehem-Hingham Shipyard, Inc., in Hingham, Massachusetts, on 5 November 1943. Allocated to the United Kingdom, she received the British name Hotham and was launched on 21 December 1943. She was transferred to the United Kingdom upon completion on 8 February 1944.

== Service history ==
Commissioned into service in the Royal Navy as the frigate HMS Hotham (K583) on 8 February 1944 simultaneously with her transfer, the ship served on escort duty for the rest of World War II. On 28 June 1944, she joined the escort destroyer HMS Eglinton (L87) in picking up survivors from the merchant ship SS Maid of Orleans southeast of St. Catherine's Point, Isle of Wight, at 50°06′00″N 000°41′00″W.

Unlike the other Captain-class frigates, Hotham was retained by the Royal Navy after the war, and was disarmed and sent to Singapore in 1945 for use as a floating power station, moving later in the year to Hong Kong for use as a station ship. She returned to the United Kingdom in 1947, and in 1948 was at Malta to serve as a floating power station. The Royal Navy later used her for experiments with gas turbine propulsion.

The Royal Navy nominally returned Hotham to the United States Government on 25 April 1952 under the terms of Lend-Lease, but the United States simultaneously transferred her back to the United Kingdom under the terms of the Mutual Defense Assistance Program.

== Disposal ==
The Royal Navy returned Hotham to U.S. custody for the final time on 13 March 1956, and she was sold for scrapping in the Netherlands on 1 November 1956.
