= Charles Hotham =

Royal Navy officer and colonial administrator (1806–1855)

Captain Sir Charles Hotham KCB
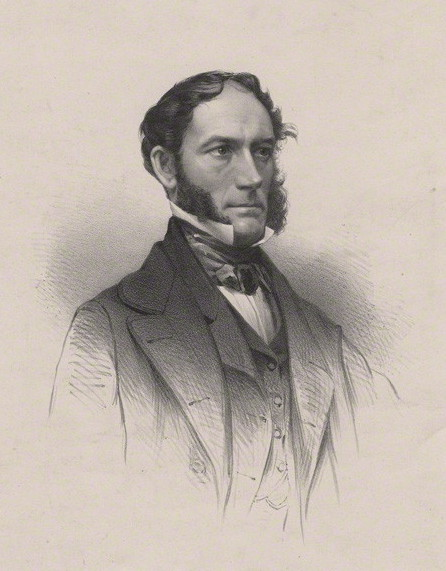
- Lithograph by James Henry Lynch, printed by Day & Son, 1859

2nd Lieutenant-Governor of Victoria
- In office 22 June 1854 – 22 May 1855
- Preceded by: Charles La Trobe

1st Governor of Victoria
- In office 22 May 1855 – 10 November 1855
- Monarch: Queen Victoria
- Succeeded by: Sir Henry Barkly

Personal details
- Born: 14 January 1806 Dennington, Suffolk, England
- Died: 31 December 1855 (aged 49) Melbourne, Colony of Victoria, British Empire
- Spouse: Jane Sarah Bridport

Captain Sir Charles Hotham KCB (14 January 1806 – 31 December 1855) was Lieutenant-Governor and, later, Governor of Victoria, Australia from 22 June 1854 to 10 November 1855.

== Early life ==
Hotham was born at Dennington, Suffolk, England. His father was Rev. Frederick Hotham, prebendary of Rochester, and his mother was Anne Elizabeth (née Hodges). Hotham entered the navy on 6 November 1818. He was in command of the steam sloop HMS Gorgon which ran aground in Montevideo Bay in May 1844 and showed skill and determination in getting her refloated by November.

One of the lieutenants on board was the future Admiral Sir Astley Cooper Key.

== Australia ==
Hotham was appointed lieutenant-governor of Victoria on 6 December 1853 by the Duke of Newcastle.

Hotham was governor at the time of the Eureka Stockade. When Hotham became lieutenant-governor, replacing La Trobe, he enforced mining licensing laws. On 19 November 1854, he appointed a Royal Commission on goldfields problems and grievances. According to historian Geoffrey Blainey "It was perhaps the most generous concession offered by a governor to a major opponent in the history of Australia up to that time. The members of the commission were appointed before Eureka...they were men who were likely to be sympathetic to the diggers."

The first eye witness account of the Massacre at the Eureka Stockade in December 1854 was published just a year after the event, by Raffaello Carboni. He was a principal Rebel, multilingual and better educated than most. He was in no doubt that the man most responsible for the massacre was Lieutenant-Governor Charles Hotham.

On 30 November 1854, Carboni, Father Smyth and George Black (newspaper editor), from the Central Council of the Eureka Rebels, asked Ballarat Goldfields Commissioner Rede to call off the licence hunts which had intensified on Hotham's secret orders and which were enraging miners. Rede said that 'the licence is a mere cloak to cover a democratic revolution'. Carboni wrote that Rede was 'only a marionette ... before us. Each of his words, each of his movements, was the vibration of the telegraph wires directed from Toorak' (p. xiii). H. V. Evatt, an esteemed legal mind of mid 20th century puts the blame for the massacre on Hotham's deliberate duplicity (p.xvi).

Carboni left the Stockade about midnight. He wrote that at that stage there was confidence about a resolution of the matter without bloodshed, but that was only because Hotham had told the miners and police and military, different things. No one was expecting an assault from the military and police Camp. He also wrote 'It was perfectly understood, and openly declared ... that we meant to organise for defence, and that we had taken up arms for no other purpose'. (p. 67). And 'the spies being sent from the Camp to enrol themselves amongst the insurgents, and who, report says, urged them to attack the Camp, which was repudiated by the diggers - they saying they would act upon the defensive'. (p. 132).

Carboni, with 18 others, was put on trial for his life. Hotham directed that American Rebels, some of whom were very prominent, not be prosecuted. He gave them an amnesty; but not quite all, the African American John Joseph was abandoned by Hotham and American officials. The prisoners appealed to Hotham, 'There is a paragraph in our petition to the effect, that if 'His Excellency had found sufficient extenuation in the conduct of American citizens', we thought there were equally good grounds for extending similar clemency to all, irrespective of nationality .... it is a violation of the very principle enunciated by His Excellency in his report, viz.'That it is the duty of a Government to administer equal justice to all' (p. 134). There was a Royal Commission into the Massacre and Hotham wasn't blamed, probably because Hotham's critics were not heard. Hotham's post was raised to a full governorship on 3 February 1855.

== Later life ==
Hotham, whose health was failing, caught a chill on 17 December 1855 while opening the Melbourne Gasworks. He died two weeks later on 31 December, and was buried in the Melbourne General Cemetery.

In December 1853, he had married Jane Sarah Hood, daughter of Lord Bridport Samuel Hood. She survived him.

== Legacy ==
Several places have been named after him, most notably:

- Mount Hotham
- the town of Hotham (now North Melbourne)
- the federal Division of Hotham
- the Sir Charles Hotham Hotels in Melbourne and Geelong
- roads including Hotham Streets in Preston, Collingwood, East Melbourne, Traralgon, Cranbourne, Hughesdale, Lake Wendouree, Lower Templestowe and Seddon; Hotham Road, Niddrie; and Hotham Avenue in Mount Macedon.

He was a character in the 1949 film Eureka Stockade.

== See also ==
- O'Byrne, William Richard (1849). "Hotham, Charles" . A Naval Biographical Dictionary . John Murray – via Wikisource.

Government offices
Preceded by Charles La Trobe (Lt.-Gov.)	Governor of Victoria; 1855	Succeeded by Sir Henry Barkly
