= Courier (disambiguation) =

A courier is a person, company or vehicle that transports mail and small items.

Courier may also refer to:

== Arts and entertainment ==
=== Film and television ===
- Courier (film), a 1986 Soviet film directed by Karen Shakhnazarov
- The Courier (1988 film), a British thriller film
- The Courier (2012 film), an action film
- The Courier (2019 film), an American-British thriller film
- The Courier (2020 film), a spy film starring Benedict Cumberbatch
- The Courier (2024 film), a crime thriller film
- "The Courier" (The Blacklist), a 2013 episode of TV series The Blacklist

=== Other arts and entertainment ===
- The Couriers, a series of graphic novels
- The Courier, a novel in the 1970s Tobin series by the British author Stanley Morgan
- The Courier or Courier 6, the player character in the video game Fallout: New Vegas
- Courier (Akudama Drive), a fictional character from the anime Akudama Drive
- Courier (album), 2002, by Richard Shindell

== Periodicals ==
=== Newspapers ===
==== Australia ====
- The Courier (Narrabri), a regional newspaper published in Narrabri, New South Wales
- The Courier (Mount Barker), an independent local newspaper published since 1880 in the town of Mount Barker, South Australia
- The Courier (Hobart), a 19th-century newspaper published in Hobart, Tasmania
- The Courier (Ballarat), a daily regional newspaper published in Ballarat, Victoria

==== Canada ====
- The Capilano Courier, a Canadian student newspaper published at Capilano University
- Vancouver Courier, a Canadian semi-weekly local newspaper

==== United Kingdom ====
- The Courier (Dundee) or The Courier & Advertiser, a broadsheet newspaper published in Dundee, Scotland
- The Courier (Newcastle University newspaper), a weekly student newspaper
- Leamington Courier, a newspaper in England
- South Oxfordshire Courier, a free newspaper, distributed throughout Southern Oxfordshire
- Tyrone Courier, a weekly newspaper based in Dungannon, County Tyrone, Northern Ireland

==== United States ====
- Claremont Courier, a local newspaper published in Claremont, California
- California Courier (19th century), a newspaper edited by Thomas J. Dryer
- Bridgeport Courier, Connecticut Courier, Easton Courier, Monroe Courier, East Haven Courier and North Haven Courier, various defunct Connecticut newspapers; see List of newspapers in Connecticut
- Champaign–Urbana Courier, called The Courier from 1971 to 1977, Illinois
- Lincoln Courier, a daily newspaper published in Lincoln, Illinois
- Ottumwa Courier, a newspaper published in Ottumwa, Iowa
- The Waterloo-Cedar Falls Courier, a daily newspaper published in Waterloo / Cedar Falls, Iowa
- The Houma Courier, a daily newspaper published in Houma, Louisiana
- Boston Courier, a newspaper published in Boston, Massachusetts
- Charlevoix Courier, a weekly newspaper of Charlevoix, Michigan
- Capital City Courier, a newspaper published between 1894 and 1903 in Lincoln, Nebraska
- The Courier (Findlay), a daily newspaper published in Findlay, Ohio
- Pittsburgh Courier, a newspaper published from 1907 to 1965 in Pittsburgh, Pennsylvania
- Bristol Courier, merged with the Bucks County Courier Times of Levittown, Pennsylvania
- The Courier (Conroe newspaper), a newspaper published in Conroe, Texas (Houston area)

==== Newspapers published elsewhere ====
- Clare Courier, a newspaper based in Ballycasey, Shannon, County Clare, Ireland
- Courier (Israeli newspaper), a Russian-language newspaper published in Tel Aviv
- The Timaru Courier, an A3 tabloid community newspaper in the Timaru South Canterbury area of New Zealand
- Courier du Bas-Rhin, published in the Prussian exclave of Kleve in the late 18th and early 19th centuries

=== Magazines ===
- Courier (Quarterly), a magazine published in Britain during the period 1938–1951
- The Courier (magazine), an American gaming magazine published from 1968 to 2005
- The Courier (ACP-EU), a magazine published by the Development Directorate General of the European Commission
- CERN Courier, a trade magazine covering current developments in high-energy physics and related fields
- Dhaka Courier, a Bangladeshi, English-language weekly news magazine

== Technology ==
- Courier (typeface), a monospaced slab serif typeface or font
- Courier, a line of modems, manufactured by USRobotics
- Courier 1B, telecommunications satellite
- Courier (email client), used in Microsoft Windows
- Courier Mail Server, computer software
- Microsoft Courier, a prototype tablet computer from Microsoft

== Transport ==
=== Aviation ===
- Airspeed Courier, a pre-Second World War, British, single-engined light aircraft
- C-38 Courier, US military designation for the Gulfstream G100
- Consolidated O-17 Courier, a US National Guard biplane
- Helio Courier, a STOL light aircraft
- Rans S-7 Courier, a modern, two–seat light aircraft

=== Maritime ===
- Courier (ship)

=== Rail ===
- Courier, a GWR Iron Duke Class steam locomotive
- Courier, a GWR 3031 Class locomotive, 1892–1914

=== Road ===
- Sandusky Courier, made by Sandusky in Sandusky, Ohio, US, 1904–1905
- Courier Car Co, Daytom, Ohio, US, 1909
- Ford Courier, a light truck
- Triumph Courier, a small van based on the Triumph Herald (1962–1966)

== Other uses ==
- Courier chess, a variant on the game of chess
- Courier (smuggling), someone who personally smuggles contraband across a border for a smuggling organization
- Courier City-Oscawana, a neighborhood within the city limits of Tampa, Florida, US
- Jim Courier (born 1970), American tennis player

== See also ==
- Courrier (disambiguation)
- Courier Mail (disambiguation)
- The Daily Courier (disambiguation)
- Currier (disambiguation)
