= Eureka Flag =

Australian rebel flag at the Eureka Stockade

- A modern digitisation of the flag
- The Flag of the Southern Cross
- Use: Symbol of Australian democracy and worker's rights. Has also been used by the Australian republican movement and far-right groups.
- Proportion: 13:20
- Adopted: 1854 (by the Eureka Rebels) (Never officially adopted)
- Design: 5 white eight-pointed stars representing the Southern Cross on a Prussian blue background, connected by a shape similar to a St George's Cross
- Designed by: Henry Charles Ross

The Eureka Flag was flown at the Battle of the Eureka Stockade, which took place on 3 December 1854 at Ballarat in Victoria, Australia on Bakers Hill. It was the culmination of the 1851 to 1854 Eureka Rebellion on the Victorian goldfields. Gold miners protested the cost of mining permits, the officious way the colonial authorities enforced the system, and other grievances. An estimated crowd of over 10,000 demonstrators swore allegiance to the flag as a symbol of defiance at Bakery Hill on 29 November 1854. It was then flown over the Eureka Stockade during the battle that resulted in at least 27 deaths. Around 120 miners were arrested, and many others were badly wounded, including five soldiers.

The field is Prussian blue, measuring 260 by 400 centimetres (100 in × 160 in) (13:20 proportion) and made from a fine woollen fabric. The horizontal arm of the cross is 37 centimetres (15 in) wide, and the vertical arm is 36 centimetres (14 in) tall. The central star is slightly larger (8.5%) than the others, being about 65 centimetres (26 in), all from point to point and the other stars 60 centimetres (24 in). The white stars are made from a fine cotton lawn, and the off-white cross is cotton twill. (Note: According to measurements made during the 1973 restoration, only seven per cent of the left star remains with about 130 square centimetres (20 sq in) missing. Five per cent of the top star remains with 130 square centimetres (20 sq in) missing. This star is positioned 18 centimetres (7.1 in) from the fly end of the flag and 20 degrees left of vertical. The top star has a number of irregularities and is missing 200 square centimetres (31 sq in). It also features several holes and stains. The bottom star is seventy degrees to the right of vertical and is mainly intact with two areas of about 20 square centimetres (3.1 sq in) missing, along with several smaller holes. Unlike the woollen field, the cotton material used for the cross is in a state of advanced decay. The horizontal arm has large holes along with brittle threads and dishevelled edges.) In addition to a modern, standardised version, there are also other Eureka Flag variants.

Since the 19th century, the Eureka Flag has achieved customary use as a general-purpose symbol of protest and has been adopted by supporters of the Australian republic and trade union movements. It has also been incorporated into the official logo of the far-right Australia First Party and is often seen on bumper stickers accompanied by white nationalist political slogans. There have been efforts, such as around the time of the 150th anniversary in 2004 by Ballarat MP Catherine King, to give legal standing to the Eureka Flag under the Flags Act and to reserve it for more progressive causes.

The Eureka Flag is listed as an object of significance on the Victorian Heritage Register and was designated as a Victorian icon by the National Trust of Australia in 2006. The "King" fragments are part of the collection of the Art Gallery of Ballarat, which is responsible for their conservation. Since 2013, they have been on a long-term loan to the interpretative centre located at the Eureka Stockade Memorial Park, where they remain on public display. There are also other notable authenticated Eureka Flag fragments to have been exhibited and sold at auction.

The disputed first report of the attack on the Eureka Stockade also refers to a Union Jack being flown during the battle that was captured, along with the Eureka Flag, by the foot police.

== History ==
The Port Phillip District was partitioned on 1 July 1851 by the Australian Constitutions Act 1850, as Victoria gained autonomy within the British Empire after a decade of de facto independence from New South Wales. Approval of the Victorian constitution by the Imperial parliament was pending, with an election held for a provisional legislative council consisting of 20 elected and ten appointed members subject to property-based franchise and membership requirements.

Gold prospectors were offered 200 guineas for making discoveries within 320 kilometres (200 mi) of Melbourne. In August 1851, the news was received worldwide that, on top of several earlier finds, Thomas Hiscock, outside of Buninyong in central Victoria, had found still more deposits. As gold fever took hold, the colony's population increased from 77,000 in 1851 to 198,496 in 1853. Among this number was "a heavy sprinkling of ex-convicts, gamblers, thieves, rogues and vagabonds of all kinds".

The local authorities soon found themselves with fewer police officers and lacked the infrastructure needed to support the expansion of the mining industry. The number of public servants and factory and farm workers leaving for the goldfields to seek their fortune led to a chronic labour shortage that needed to be resolved. The response was a universal mining tax based on time stayed, rather than what was seen as the more equitable option, being an export duty levied only on gold found, meaning it was always designed to make life unprofitable for most prospectors.

Licence inspections, known as "digger hunts", were treated as a great sport and "carried out in the style of an English fox-hunt" by mounted officials who received a fifty per cent commission from any fines imposed. Many recruits were former prisoners from Tasmania and prone to brutal means, having been sentenced to serve in the military. Miners were often arrested for not carrying licences on their person because of the typically wet and dirty conditions in the mines, then subjected to such indignities as being chained to trees and logs overnight.

In the years leading up to the Eureka Stockade, several mass public meetings were held to address the miners' grievances. The Bendigo Petition received over 5,000 signatures and was presented to Lieutenant-Governor Charles La Trobe by a miner's delegation in August 1853. There were also delegations received by the Ballarat gold commissioner Robert William Rede and La Trobe's successor Charles Hotham in October and November 1854. The ever-present "physical force" faction of the mining tax protest movement gained the ascendancy over those who advocated "moral force", including John Basson Humffray, after a judicial enquiry into the murder of miner James Scobie outside the Eureka Hotel. There was no finding of guilt regarding the owner, James Bently, who was deeply suspected of involvement, with the case being presided over by a police magistrate accused of having a conflict of interest.

Then, there was an uproar over the arrest of Catholic Father Smyth's disabled Armenian servant, Johannes Gregorius. He was subjected to police brutality and false arrest for licence evasion, even though it was revealed he was exempt from the requirement. Gregorius was instead convicted of assaulting a constable and fined 5 pounds despite the court hearing testimony to the contrary.

Eventually, the discontent began to spiral out of control. A mob of many thousands of aggrieved miners burned the Eureka Hotel on 17 October 1854. On 28 November, there was a skirmish as the approaching 12th Regiment (East Suffolk) had their wagon train looted in the vicinity of the Eureka lead, where the rebels ultimately made their last stand. The next day, the Eureka Flag appeared on the platform for the first time, and mining licences were burnt at the final fiery mass meeting of the Ballarat Reform League – the miners' lobby. The league's founding charter proclaims that "it is the inalienable right of every citizen to have a voice in making the laws he is called upon to obey" and "taxation without representation is tyranny", in the language of the United States Declaration of Independence.

On 30 November, there was further rioting where missiles were once again directed at military and law enforcement by the protesting miners, who had henceforth refused to cooperate with licence inspections en masse. That afternoon there was a paramilitary display on Bakery Hill. The oath-swearing ceremony took place around the Eureka Flag, and military companies were then formed. In the preceding weeks, the men of violence had already been aiming musket balls at the barely fortified government camp during the night.

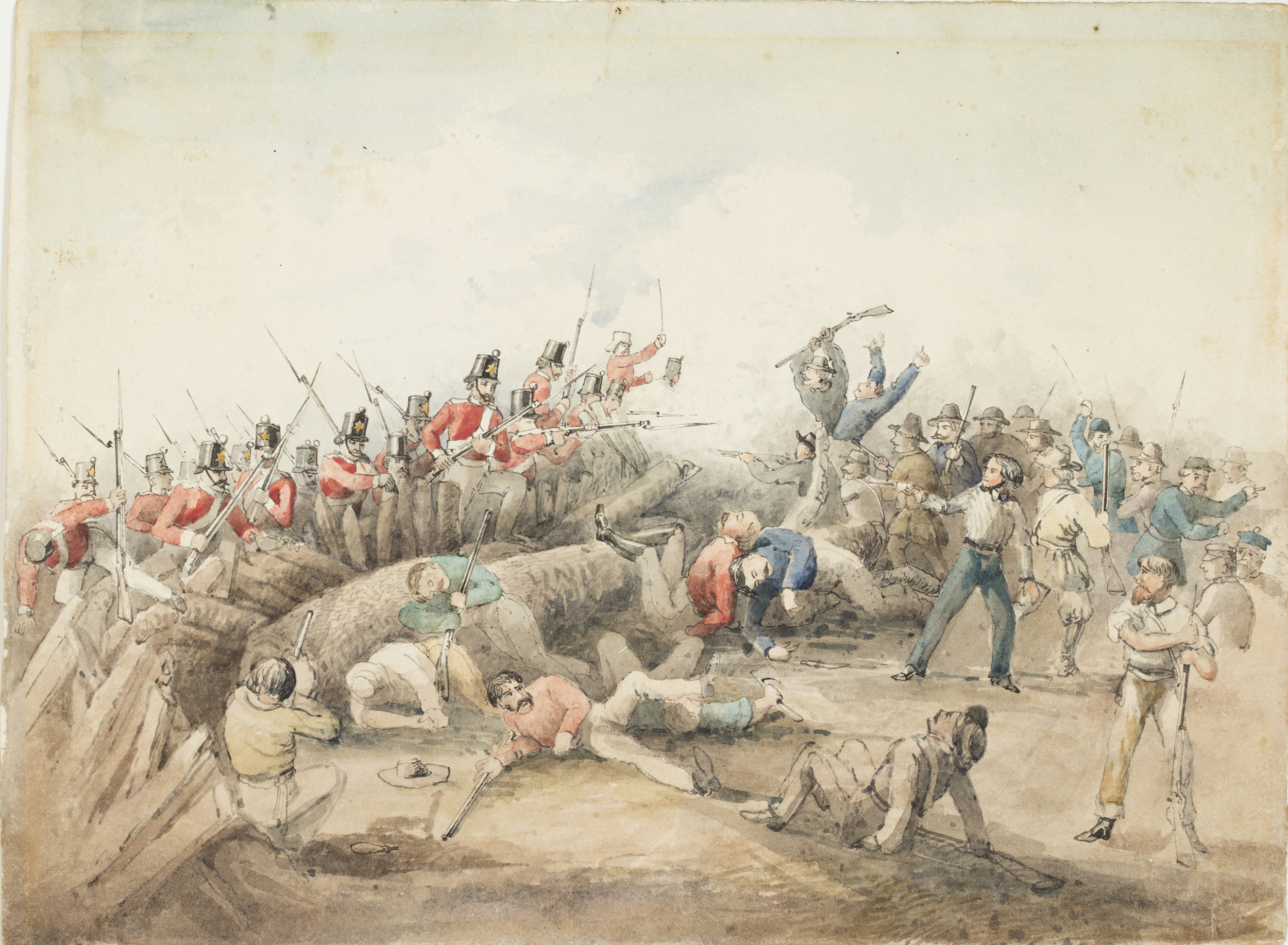
Eureka Stockade Riot by J. B. Henderson (1854)

The rebels, under their commander-in-chief Peter Lalor, who had left Ireland for the gold fields of Australia, were led down the road from Bakery Hill to the ill-fated Eureka Stockade. It was a crude "higgledy piggledy" battlement erected between 30 November and 2 December that consisted of diagonal spikes and overturned horse carts. In the ensuing battle that left at least 22 rebels and seven soldiers dead, the stockade was besieged and captured by the advancing government forces. They briefly wavered, with the 40th Regiment (2nd Somersetshire) having to be rallied amid a short, sharp exchange of ranged fire lasting around 15 minutes at dawn on Sunday, 3 December. The Victorian police contingent led the way over the top as the forlorn hope in a bayonet charge.

=== Origin and symbolism ===
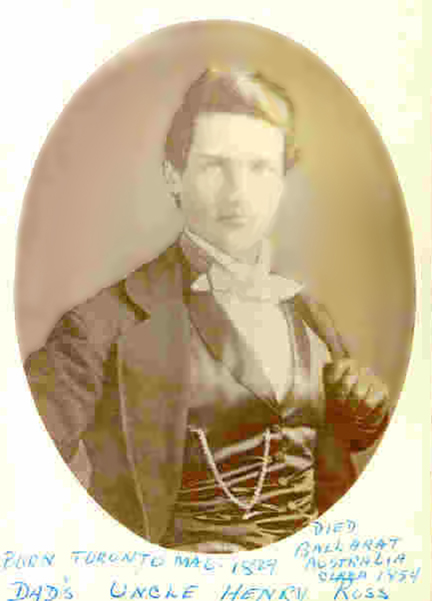
Portrait of Henry Ross, one of the rebel captains, who may be the designer of the Eureka Flag

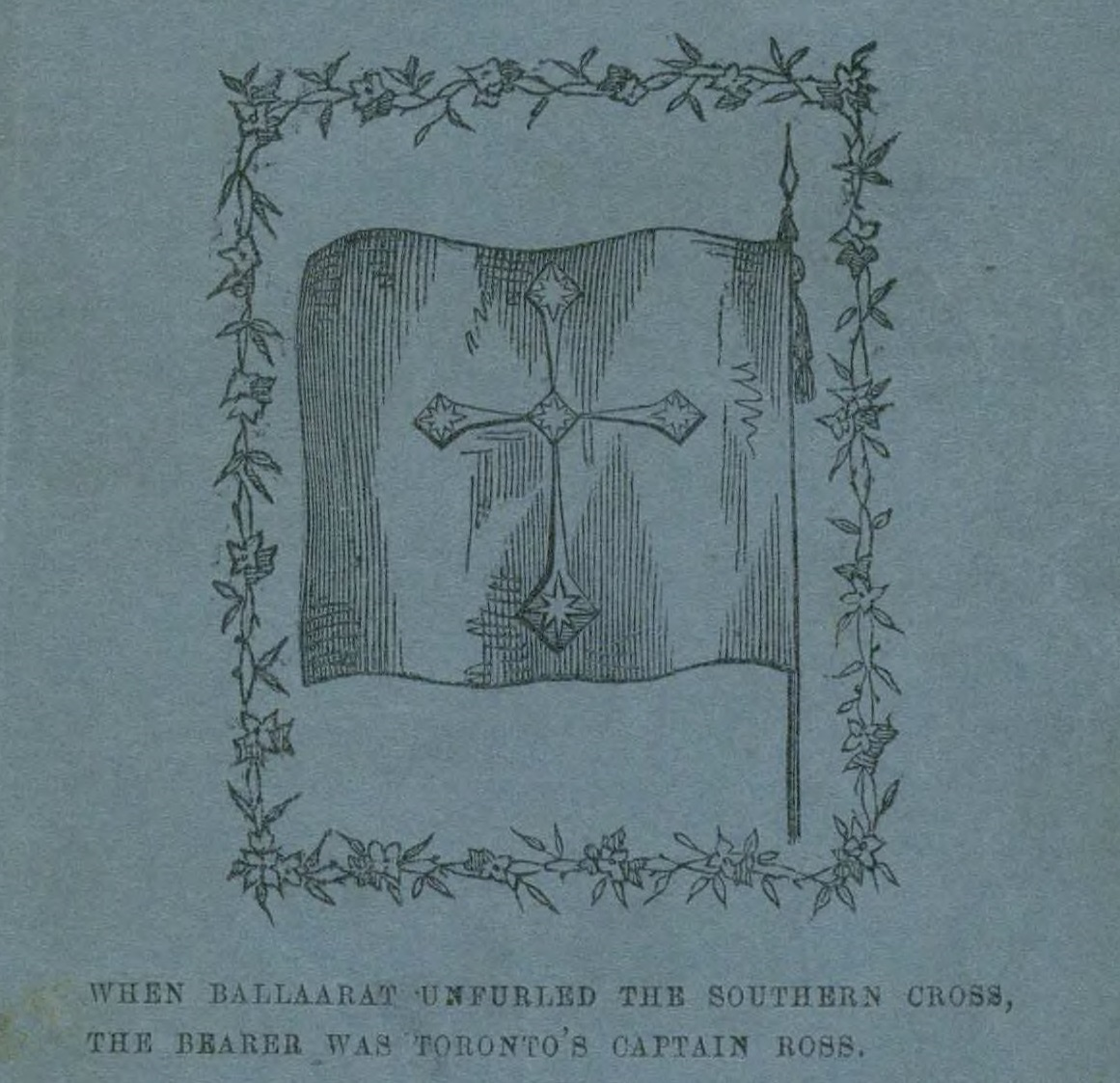
The front cover of Raffaello Carboni's 1855 The Eureka Stockade featuring a Eureka Flag with diamond-shaped stars

The earliest mention of a flag was the report of a meeting held on 23 October 1854 to discuss indemnifying Andrew McIntyre and Thomas Fletcher, who had both been arrested and committed for trial over the burning of the Eureka Hotel. The correspondent for the Melbourne Herald stated: "Mr. Kennedy suggested that a tall flag pole should be erected on some conspicuous site, the hoisting of the diggers' flag on which should be the signal for calling together a meeting on any subject which might require immediate consideration."

In 1885, John Wilson, whom the Victorian Works Department employed at Ballarat as a foreman, claimed that he had originally conceptualised the Eureka Flag after becoming sympathetic to the rebel cause. He then recalls that it was constructed from bunting by a tarpaulin maker. There is another popular tradition where the flag design is credited to a member of the Ballarat Reform League, "Captain" Henry Ross of Toronto, in Ontario, Canada. A. W. Crowe recounted in 1893 that "it was Ross who gave the order for the insurgents' flag at Darton and Walker's". Crowe's story is confirmed in that there were advertisements in the Ballarat Times dating from October–November 1854 for Darton and Walker, manufacturers of tents, tarpaulin and flags, situated at the Gravel Pits.

It has long been said that women were involved in constructing the Eureka Flag. In a letter to the editor published in the Melbourne Age, 15 January 1855 edition, Fredrick Vern states that he "fought for freedom's cause, under a banner made and wrought by English ladies". According to some of their descendants, Anastasia Withers, Anne Duke and Anastasia Hayes were all involved in sewing the flag. (Note: Anastasia Withers was first mentioned in connection with the Eureka Flag in a 1986 article entitled "Women and the Eureka Flag" published in Overland. The author Len Fox had received correspondence from Val D'Argri who had been informed by an aunt, May Flavell, that her great grandmother was one of three women responsible for sewing the Eureka Flag. In 1992, Fox also named Anne Duke for the first time on the basis of oral tradition preserved by the organisation Eureka's Children, which was formed in 1988 by descendants of those who took part in the Eureka Rebellion. Anastasia Hayes was only put forward in 2000 by her descendant Anne Hall, a Children of Eureka committee member. In 1889, William Withers interviewed Anastasia Hayes for his 1870 book on the history of Ballarat. Hayes recalled being present when Peter Lalor's arm was amputated in the St Alipius presbytery. However, she apparently mentioned nothing about the Eureka Flag.) The stars are made of delicate material, consistent with the story they were made out of their petticoats. The blue woollen fabric "certainly bears a marked resemblance to the standard dressmaker's length of material for making up one of the voluminous dresses of the 1850s" and also the blue shirts worn by the miners.

In his seminal Flag of Stars, Frank Cayley published two sketches he discovered on a visit to the soon-to-be headquarters of the Ballarat Historical Society in 1963, which may be the original plans for the Eureka Flag. One is a two-dimensional drawing of a flag bearing the words "blue" and "white" to denote the colour scheme. Cayley has concluded: "It looks like a rough design of the so-called King Flag." The other sketch was "pasted on the same piece of card shows the flag being carried by a bearded man" that Cayley believes may have been intended as a representation of Henry Ross. (Note: Ballarat militaria consultant Paul O'Brien has carried out an expert analysis of the Cayley sketches concluding that: "This sketch, once in the collection of the Ballarat Historical Society, location now unknown, was originally displayed with another sketch representing the 'Eureka' or 'King' flag and was labelled 'Found in a Tent After the Affair at Eureka'. The sketches were first reproduced in Frank Cayley's book Flag of Stars. The assumption made in the accompanying text was that the sketch was a draft design for the making of the flag. While this assumption is quite plausible, it would seem more likely that the sketch was made after the capture of the flag. Note the tattered leading edge and indistinct star. The number of points to the stars represented also does not tally with those on the surviving 'King' flag. This sketch was, perhaps, drawn after the flag was 'brought in triumph' to the government camp and while it was being savaged by eager souvenir hunters. The two sketches have been drawn by different hands, and many details of design differ considerably (notably the hoist edge and number of star points). The size of the flag in the sketch with figure does not tally with the enormous size of the 'King' flag, and is probably a later, not contemporary, representation.") Federation University history professor Anne Beggs-Sunter refers to an article reportedly published in the Ballarat Times "shortly after the Stockade referring to two women making the flag from an original drawing by a digger named Ross. Unfortunately no complete set of the Ballarat Times exists, and it is impossible to locate this intriguing reference."

The theory that the Eureka Flag is based on the Australian Federation Flag has precedents in that "borrowing the general flag design of the country one is revolting against can be found in many instances of colonial liberation, including Haiti, Venezuela, Iceland, and Guinea". Some resemblance to the modern Flag of Quebec has been noted, that was based on a design used by the French-speaking majority of the colony of the Province of Canada at the time Ross emigrated. Ballarat local historian Father Tom Linane thought women from the St Aliphius chapel on the goldfields might have made the flag. This theory is supported by St Aliphius raising a blue and white ecclesiastical flag featuring a couped cross to signal that mass was about to commence. Professor Geoffrey Blainey believed that the white cross on which the stars are arrayed is "really an Irish cross rather than being [a] configuration of the Southern Cross".

Cayley has stated that the field "may have been inspired by the sky, but was more probably intended to match the blue shirts worn by the diggers". Norm D'Angri theorises that the Eureka Flag was hastily manufactured, and the number of points on the stars is a mere convenience as eight was "the easiest to construct without using normal drawing instruments".

=== Oath swearing at Bakery Hill ===
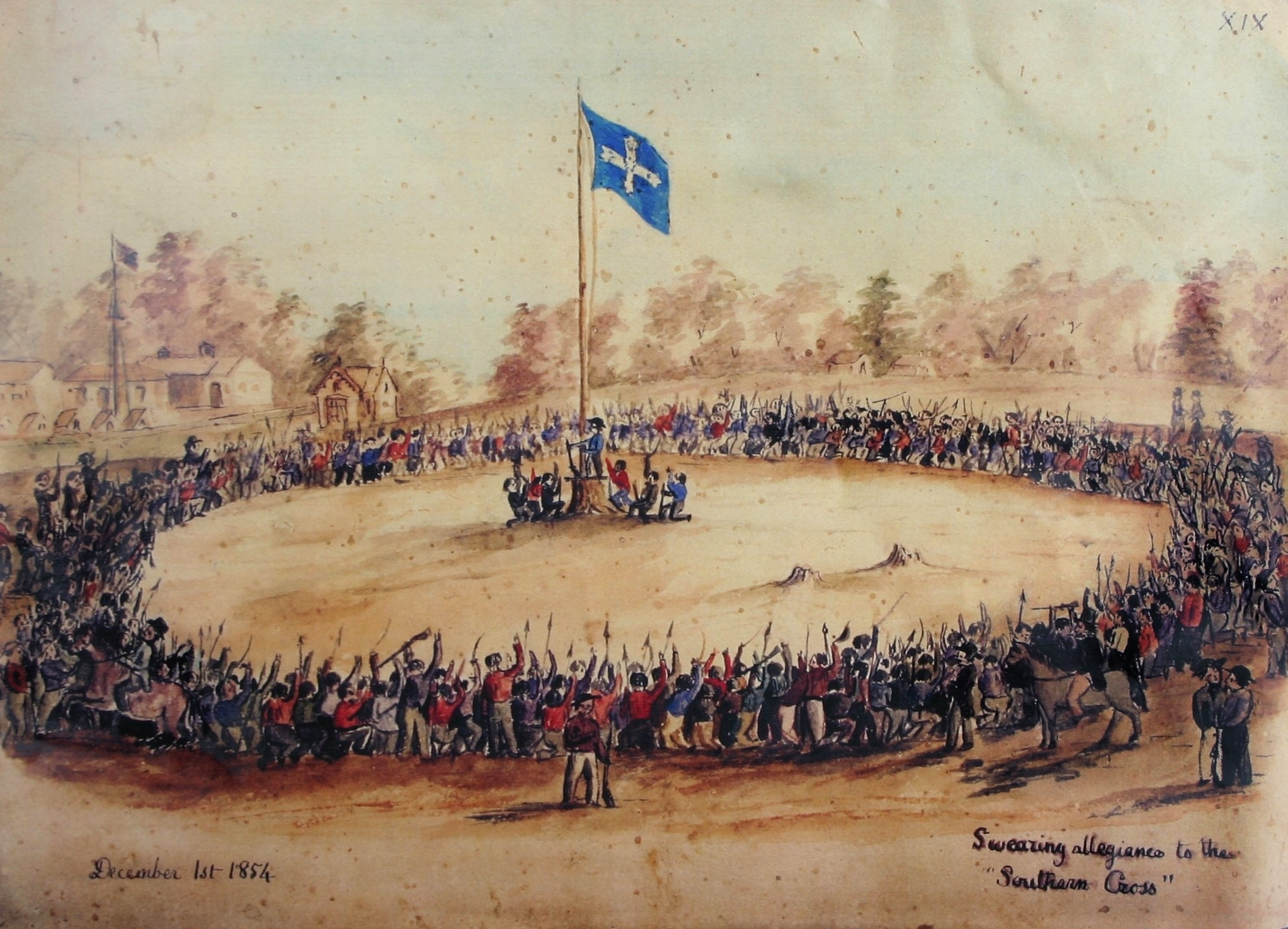
Swearing Allegiance to the Southern Cross by Charles Doudiet (1854)

Before the oath-swearing ceremony at Bakery Hill on 30 November 1854, another recorded hoisting of the Eureka Flag occurred that day. In his open letter to the colonists of Victoria, dated 7 April 1855, Peter Lalor said that he heard the news that shots were fired on miners at the Gravel Pits. Along with an armed mob, he then headed towards Barker and Hunt's store on Specimen Hill. It was here the Eureka Flag "was procured and hoisted on the flagstaff belonging to Barker and Hunt; but it was almost immediately hauled down, and we moved down to the holes on the Gravel Pits Flat."

John Wilson claimed to have enlisted the help of prisoners to procure the flag pole on Bakery Hill. He said that it was 60 feet (18 m) long and felled from an area known as Byle's Swamp in Bullarook. Then it was set into an abandoned mineshaft, and his design of "five white stars on a blue ground, floated gaily in the breeze".

The Ballarat Times first mentioned the Eureka Flag on 24 November 1854 in an article about a meeting of the Ballarat Reform League to be held the following Wednesday where, "The Australian flag shall triumphantly wave in the sunshine of its own blue and peerless sky, over thousands of Australia's adopted sons." There are also other examples of it being referred to at the time as the Australian flag. The day after the battle, the Age reported that: "They assembled round the Australian flag, which has now a permanent flag-staff."

The Geelong Advertiser stated, "The following remarkable scene at the inauguration of the 'Australian flag', and the organisation of the first 'rebel army' in these colonies" and that "The 'Australian Flag', it appears, has been captured from the volunteers." In a despatch dated 20 December 1854, Lieutenant-Governor Charles Hotham said: "The disaffected miners ... held a meeting whereat the Australian flag of independence was solemnly consecrated and vows offered for its defence."

In the subsequent Ballarat Times report of the oath-swearing ceremony, it was stated that:

During the whole of the morning several men were busily employed in erecting a stage and planting the flagstaff. This is a splendid pole of about 80 feet and straight as an arrow. This work being completed about 11 o'clock, the Southern Cross was hoisted, and its maiden appearance was a fascinating object to behold. There is no flag in Europe, or in the civilised world, half so beautiful and Bakery Hill as being the first place where the Australian ensign was first hoisted, will be recorded in the deathless and indelible pages of history. The flag is silk, blue ground with a large silver cross; no device or arms, but all exceedingly chaste and natural.

Lalor, armed with a rifle, took the initiative by mounting a stump and proclaiming "liberty", then called for rebel volunteers to form themselves into companies. Near the base of the flagpole, Lalor knelt with his head uncovered, pointed his right hand to the Eureka Flag, and swore to the affirmation of over 10,000 demonstrators: "We swear by the Southern Cross to stand truly by each other and fight to defend our rights and liberties." Raffaello Carboni recalls that Henry Ross was the "bridegroom" of the flag and "sword in hand, he had posted himself at the foot of the flag-staff, surrounded by his rifle division".

In 1931, R. S. Reed claimed that "an old tree stump on the south side of Victoria Street, near Humffray Street, is the historic tree at which the pioneer diggers gathered in the days before the Eureka Stockade to discuss their grievances against the officialdom of the time." Reed called for the formation of a committee of citizens to "beautify the spot, and to preserve the tree stump" upon which Lalor addressed the assembled rebels during the oath swearing ceremony. It was reported that the stump had "been securely fenced in, and the enclosed area is to be planted with floriferous trees. The spot is adjacent to Eureka, which is famed alike for the stockade fight and for the fact that the Welcome Nugget (sold for £10,500) was discovered in 1858 within a stone's throw of it."

The modern-day address of the oath-swearing ceremony is likely 29 St Paul's Way, Bakery Hill. As of 2016, the site is a car park and was for a hundred years a school, with plans to develop it into an apartment block.

=== Seized by police at Eureka Stockade ===
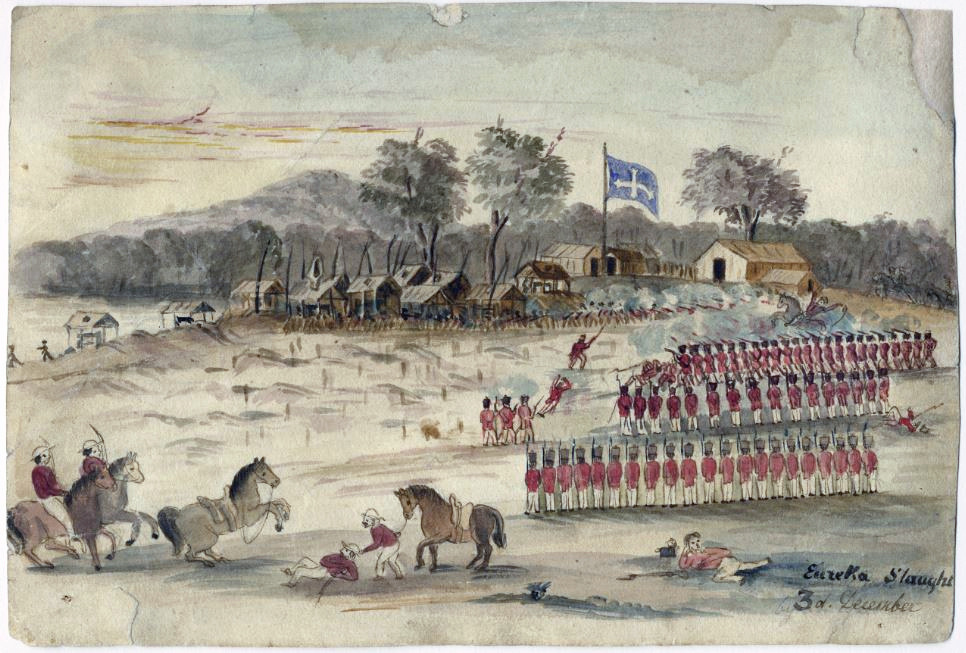
Eureka Slaughter by Charles Doudiet (1854)

After the oath-swearing ceremony, the rebels marched in double file behind the Eureka Flag from Bakery Hill to the Eureka lead, where construction of the stockade began. In his 1855 memoirs, Raffaello Carboni again mentions the role of Henry Ross, who "was our standard-bearer. He hoisted down the Southern Cross from the flag-staff, and headed the march."

In his report dated 14 December 1854, Captain John Thomas mentioned "the fact of the Flag belonging to the Insurgents (which had been nailed to the flagstaff) being captured by Constable King of the Force". King had volunteered for the honour while the battle was still raging. W. Bourke, a miner residing about 250 yards from the stockade, recalled that: "The police negotiated the wall of the Stockade on the south-west, and I then saw a policeman climb the flag pole. When up about 12 or 14 feet the pole broke, and he came down with a run."

John Lynch, who fought at the Eureka Stockade, said: "I have a vague recollection of its being pulled down by the soldiers amidst a chorus of jeers and ribald shoutings. A private of the 40th Regiment told myself and other prisoners that he was one of those who rough handled it." Theophilus Williams, a Justice of the Peace and later Mayor of Ballarat East, had a tent situated 300 yards away from the Eureka Stockade. He said that he was prepared to "affirm on affidavit that he saw two red uniformed soldiers haul down the flag".

Carboni, an eyewitness to the battle, recalls that: "A wild 'hurrah!' burst out and 'the Southern Cross' was torn down, I should say, among their laughter, such as if it had been a prize from a May-pole ... The red-coats were now ordered to 'fall in'; their bloody work was over, and were marched off, dragging with them the 'Southern Cross'."

The Geelong Advertiser reported that the flag "was carried by in triumph to the Camp, waved about in the air, then pitched from one to another, thrown down and trampled on". The soldiers also danced around the flag on a pole that was "now a sadly tattered flag from which souvenir hunters had cut and torn pieces". The morning after the battle, "the policeman who captured the flag exhibited it to the curious and allowed such as so desired to tear off small portions of its ragged end to preserve as souvenirs."

=== Exhibit in high treason trials ===
At the Eureka state treason trials that began on 22 February 1855, the 13 defendants had it put to them that they did "traitorously assemble together against our Lady the Queen" and attempt "by the force of arms to destroy the Government constituted there and by law established, and to depose our Lady the Queen from the kingly name and her Imperial Crown". Furthermore, concerning the "overt acts" that constituted the actus reus of the offence, the indictment read: "That you raised upon a pole, and collected round a certain standard, and did solemnly swear to defend each other, with the intention of levying war against our said Lady the Queen".

Called as a witness, George Webster, the chief assistant civil commissary and magistrate, testified that upon entering the stockade the besieging forces "immediately made towards the flag, and the police pulled down the flag". John King testified, "I took their flag, the southern cross, down – the same flag as now produced."

In his closing submission, the defence counsel Henry Chapman argued there were no inferences to be drawn from the hoisting of the Eureka Flag, saying:

and if the fact of hoisting that flag be at all relied upon as evidence of an intention to depose Her Majesty ... no inference whatever can be drawn from the mere hoisting of a flag as to the intention of the parties, because of the witnesses has said that two hundred flags were hoisted at the diggings; and if two hundred persons on the same spot choose to hoist their particular flag, what each means we are utterly unable to tell, and no general meaning as to hostility to the Government can be drawn from the simple fact that the diggers on that occasion hoisted a flag ... I only throw it out to you because it is utterly impossible, in the multiplicity of flags that have been hoisted on the diggings, to draw an exact inference as to the hoisting of any one particular flag at one spot.

=== Post-battle preservation ===
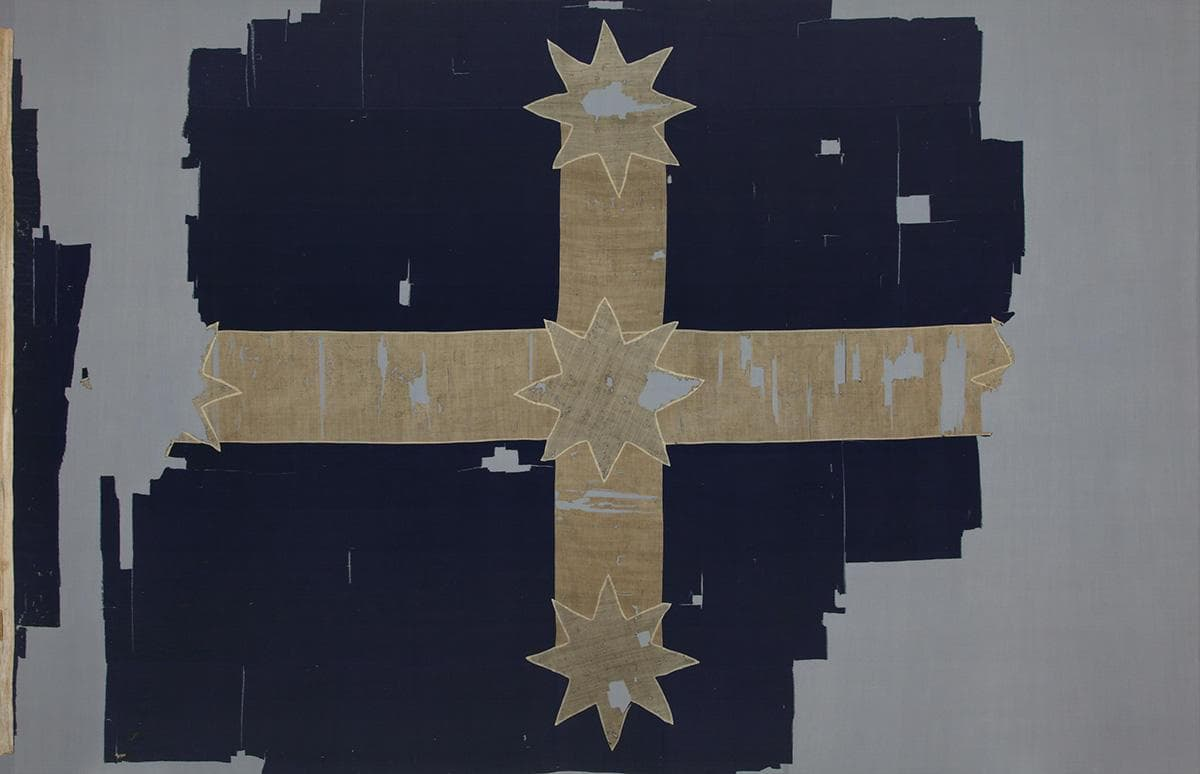
The Eureka Flag fragments donated by the King family to the Art Gallery of Ballarat

The Eureka Flag was retained by John King, who quit the police force two days after the state treason trials ended to become a farmer. In the late 1870s, he eventually settled near Minyip in the Victorian Wimmera district. It was here that the flag "made occasional appearances at country bazaars". In his 1870 history of Ballarat, William Withers said he had not been able to find out what had happened to the flag. Professor Anne Beggs-Sunter thinks it is "likely that King read Withers's book, because he wrote to the Melbourne Public Library offering to sell the flag to that institution."

The head librarian, Marcus Clarke, approached Peter Lalor to authenticate the flag. He was unable, replying, "Can you find someone whose memory is more accurate than mine?" The library eventually decided not to acquire the flag due to the uncertainty over its origins. It would remain in the custody of the King family for forty years until 1895 when it was lent to the Ballarat Fine Art Gallery (now the Art Gallery of Ballarat). John King's widow Isabella would post the flag after being approached by art gallery president James Oddie, along with a letter to the secretary which reads:

Kingsley, Minyip,

1st October, 1895

Dear Sir, In connection with the wish of the president of the Ballarat Fine Arts and Public Gallery for the gift or loan of the flag that floated above the Eureka Stockade, I have much pleasure in offering loan of flag to the above association on condition that I may get it at any time I specify, or on demand of myself or my son, Arthur King. The main portion of the flag was torn along the rope that attached it to the staff, but there is still part of it around the rope so that I suppose it would be best to send the whole of it as it now is. You will find several holes, that were caused by bullets that were fired at my late husband in his endeavours to seize the flag at that memorable event:- Yours, &c.,

Mrs J. King (per Arthur King)

In a letter to his father, Fred Riley recalled visiting Ballarat in 1912 and acquiring a fragment of the Eureka Flag that now resides at the National Library of Australia. He said:

I went to the Art Gallery to see the flag the men fought under and strange to say no-one there seems to value it in the least. It is hung over a trestle affair exposed to the public. Well I got into conversation with the keeper, and persuaded him to give me a bit of the flag, and much to my surprise and astonishment he gave me a bit. I was with him when he tore it off. It seems wanton sacrilege, vandalism or something worse to tear it still he did and I am in possession of that piece.

As a result of this practice, the pieces of the flag in the art gallery collection represent only 69.01% of the original specimen. In Labour History, Professor Beggs-Sunter states that the art gallery displayed the flag "in various unsuitable ways" until it was put in a glass case alongside the sword of Captain Wise in October 1934, which she described as an "unlikely juxtaposition". When peace activist Egon Kisch visited the gallery the following year, he wrote that the Eureka monument "heroes and minions of the law, fighters and executioners ... on the same level".

The Eureka Flag remained unauthenticated at the art gallery. After being told about it by his friend Rem McClintock in December 1944, Sydney journalist Len Fox, who worked with the Communist Party media, published an article about the flag during his investigation that followed on from Withers'. He entered into correspondence with the King family, the art gallery, and Ballarat local historian Nathan Spielvogel. Fox was sent a piece of the flag by the art gallery in March 1945, along with a drawing.

Spielvogel offered to assist, although he had reasons to doubt the authenticity of the flag held by the art gallery. Later that year, Fox visited Ballarat to inspect the flag, and the custodians gave him two more pieces. Fox self-published a booklet in 1963 that advanced his argument as to why the flag at the art gallery was authentic. It was probably due to Fox's interest that in 1963, the flag was transferred to a safe at the art gallery.

Eventually, the librarian discovered that the safe had been broken into. The robber left the flag that was still there wrapped in brown paper. At this point, it was stored in a vault at the National Bank. The final irrefutable validation of its authentication occurred when sketchbooks of Canadian Charles Doudiet were put up for sale at a Christie's auction in 1996. Two sketches, in particular, show the design is the same as the tattered remains of the original flag that were first put on public display at the art gallery in 1973, being unveiled during a ceremony attended by Prime Minister Gough Whitlam. (Note: One notable inconsistency in Carboni's account is that he describes the Eureka Flag as made of silk, and the cover of the first edition has an illustration that features diamond-shaped stars. These incorrect descriptions plagued early Eureka investigators, with the fragments held by the Art Gallery of Ballarat being of cotton and mohair construction. However, the blue ground is said to have "a high sheen that gives a silk-like appearance".)

The art gallery had received a $1,000 grant from the state government to cover half the estimated cost of repairing and mounting the flag. Ballarat seamstress Val D'Angri did the conservation work in May 1973. Along with a pin, there was a "W" mark discovered at the fly end of the cross that D'Angri believes may be the signature of her great-great-grandmother Anastasia Withers. Later additions to the gallery placed the flag in a dedicated shrine in the building's centre, surrounded by Eureka-related works.

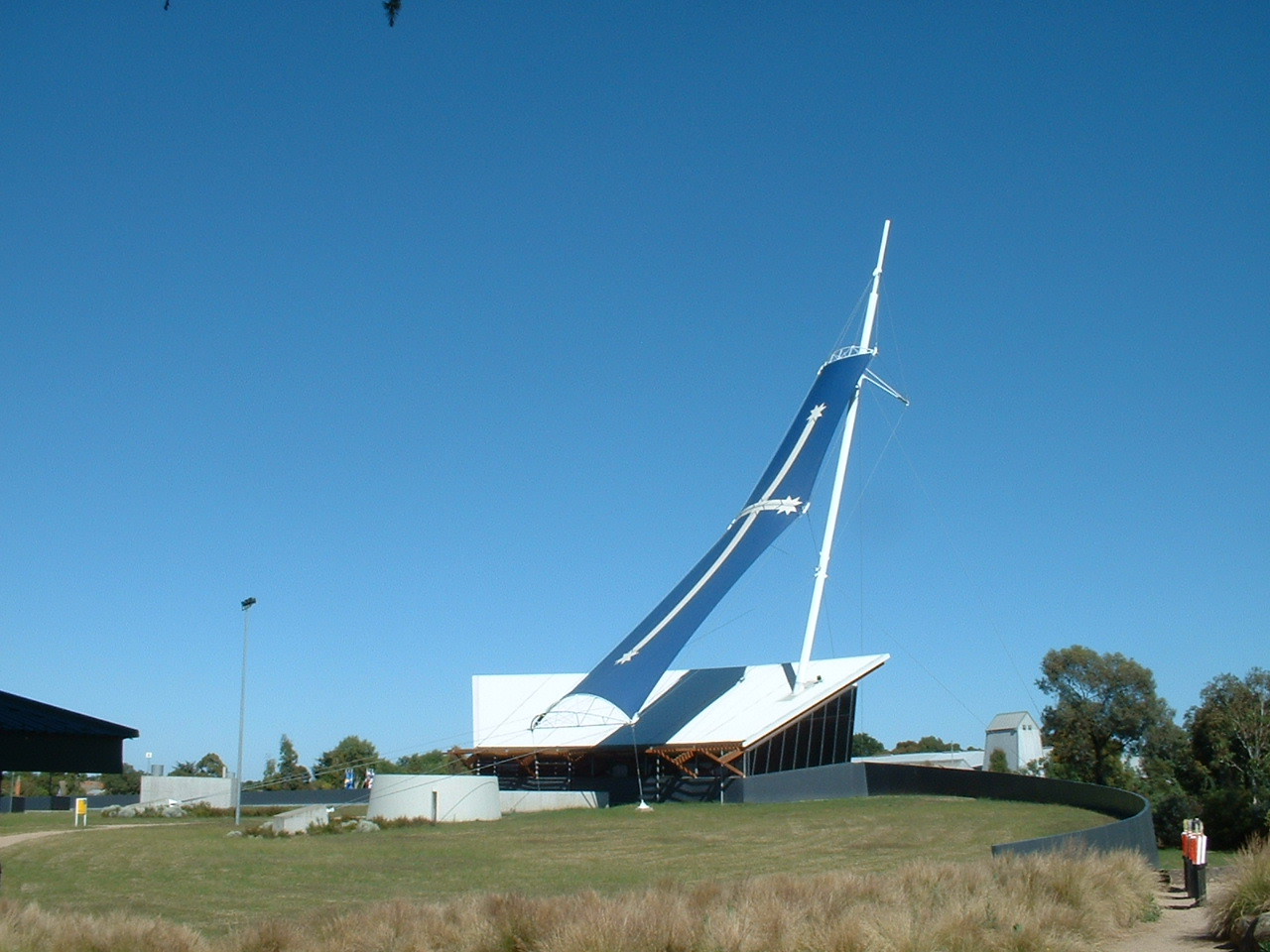
A modern variation of the Eureka Flag was central to the landmark architecture of the Eureka Centre prior to its redevelopment as the Museum of Australian Democracy

In 2001, legal ownership of the Eureka Flag was transferred to the art gallery. There was a second extensive restoration of the specimen undertaken in 2011 by leading textile conservation specialists Artlab Australia. The City of Ballarat had received a permit from Heritage Victoria to proceed with the conservation work. A full assessment of the state of the flag was commissioned. The report compiled by Artlab described the flag as "arguably the most important historical textile in Australia". The old backing cloth was replaced with state-of-the-art materials that are less prone to deterioration, along with the timber backing board. A new, purpose-built, low-light, temperature-controlled display case was also constructed. The art gallery then loaned the flag to the Museum of Australian Democracy at Eureka (MADE) in 2013. When MADE closed in 2018, the interpretive centre came under the management of the City of Ballarat. The flag was retained as the centrepiece of a visitor experience now branded as the Eureka Centre Ballarat while remaining part of the art gallery collection.

==== Other notable fragments ====
Over the years, a number of additional pieces of the Eureka Flag have been entrusted to the Art Gallery of Ballarat and other organisations or sold at auction. Martha Clendinning claimed to have a piece of the Eureka Flag that was given to her by doctor Alfred Carr. Clendinning's daughter married Robert Rede, who was the Ballarat gold commissioner at the time of the battle. In his 1896 article, Withers states that Robert Rede sent these fragments to him. They were compared to the pieces loaned to the art gallery in 1895. After a minute comparison by Mr Grainger of Sunnyside Woollen Mills, they were adjudged to be the same. A small piece of blue material was later donated to the Melbourne Public Library by Mr A. S. Kenyon, who died in 1943. Along with the fragment was a written statement signed by Mrs Clendinning that reads, "Piece of the flag set up in the Stockade. Given to me by Dr Alfred Carr immediately after it was taken."

Before it was given to the Ballarat Historical Society, the Bradford fragment was stored for many years in a leather pouch containing a note written by J. Bradford. It reads: "This piece of cloth is part of the original Eureka Stockade Flag. It was given to me by my father Wm. Bradford who had it given to him by his father Wm. Bradford Snr, who fought for freedom at Ballarat, Victoria, in 1854."

On his 1963 visit to Ballarat, Frank Cayley compared the Bradford fragment to the pieces held by the art gallery. He found they matched in both texture and colour. Acquiring a small sample of the Bradford fragment, Cayley then compared this to the piece held by the Melbourne Public Library. Apart from some variations in colour due to fading, he could detect no difference. Cayley shared his findings with fellow Eureka investigator Len Fox. They organised for experts from the School of Textile Technology at the University of New South Wales to test a piece of the Bradford fragment and a piece from the art gallery in Fox's possession. In November 1963, the report was released, concluding that the two fragments "are most probably from the same source".

The Billings fragment was discovered in Kybram, Victoria, inside a compartment of a sea chest that had once belonged to J. D. Williams, the camp surgeon at Ballarat, in December 1854. Williams obtained a piece of the Eureka Flag as a souvenir while taking care of the wounded after the battle. His descendants donated it to the art gallery in 1993.

A piece of the Eureka Flag was placed in a safe at St Patrick's Christian Brothers College in Ballarat in the early 20th century. In June 1996, it was donated to the art gallery. It was then loaned to the Royal Australian Navy when HMAS Ballarat was commissioned and went on the warship's maiden voyage.

The five tiny pieces that were given to Len Fox during his investigation were returned to the gallery by Professor Beggs-Sunter in January 1997.

Evelyn Healy was sent a fragment of the Eureka Flag by her mother, Myrtle Shaw. Healy was active with the Communist Party, and the party wanted a replica of the flag for a May Day parade in 1938. Healy believed the pieces of the Eureka Flag at the art gallery were genuine, and Shaw spoke to the gallery's custodian, William Keith. He gave Shaw a snippet along with some rough sketches and a written description. Healy then forwarded these materials to party leader Rem McClintock. When Healy asked for it back, she was told it was still needed and then that it was lost.

In July 1997, McClintock's son Alex tried to sell a piece of the Eureka Flag through Christie's auction house in Melbourne with a reserve price of $10,000. It was the same piece Len Fox mentioned in his 1986 Overland article. Healy obtained an injunction blocking the sale on the grounds that she was the lawful owner. A lengthy court case ensued, and her claim was eventually upheld. After the fragment was returned, she gave it to the art gallery in March 1998.

In 2017, the Victorian Trades Hall Council purchased a fragment of the Eureka Flag through the Melbourne auction house Mossgreen for $32,000. The seller was Adrian Millane, who inherited a piece of the flag that was reportedly handed to his great-grandfather Francis Hanlon by Peter Lalor. The auction house subsequently went bankrupt with $12 million in debt. Millane claimed he was still owed $20,000 and that he intended to use the funds to support an orphanage in Bengal, India. In 2013, Millane loaned his fragment to the former Museum of Australian Democracy, where it was displayed for the 159th anniversary of the battle.

== Customary use ==
Since the 1854 miner's revolt, the Eureka Flag, born out of adversity, has gained wider notability in Australian culture as a symbol of democracy, egalitarianism, trade unionism, white nationalism, and a general-purpose symbol of protest. Whilst some Australians view it as a symbol of nationality, it has more often been employed by historical societies, re-enactors and trade unions such as the former Builders Labourers Federation. More recently, far-right organisations and political parties have adopted it, including the Australia First Party, National Action, and some neo-Nazi groups, much to the frustration of more established socialist and progressive claimants. Depending on their political persuasion, these groups either see it as representative of the miner's efforts to free themselves from political or economic oppression or their sentiments favouring restricting non-white immigration and the eventual 1855 Chinese poll tax.

Construction union boss Kevin Reynolds and the Northern Territory's nomination for Australian of the Year, Warwick Thornton, both raised fears in 2010 that the Eureka Flag could "become a swastika-like symbol of racism." Professor Greg Craven said that 20 years prior, the Eureka Flag rivalled the official Australian flag. However, it had become so tainted through appearing on bumper stickers with racist slogans that "The Southern Cross is becoming a symbol not of unity but of exclusion." According to Craven, the union movement has also politicised the Eureka Flag, given that "The Eureka Stockade was not exclusively about the working class but also the middle class."

In a 2013 survey about national symbols, McCrindle Research found the Eureka Flag eliciting a "mixed response with 1 in 10 (10%) being extremely proud while 1 in 3 (35%) are uncomfortable with its use."

The City of Unley refused a request to fly the Eureka Flag at the local civic centre to commemorate the 166th anniversary of the Eureka Stockade in 2020. Councillor Jennifer Bonham noted the flag's place in the "struggle for democracy." However, she said it must be acknowledged that "the Chinese were persecuted on the goldfields" and "The Eureka flag can also be a symbol of that persecution." Councillor Jane Russo said that it had become symbolic of "white supremacy." (Note: Chinese-born Senator Tsebin Tchen accepted an invitation to give the annual address at the Ballarat Eureka anniversary commemorations in 1999. He later said, "I gave one of the shortest dawn speeches there'd been" as, despite being present on the goldfields, "there was not one Chinese miner in the stockade. So I had nothing to say about the stockade.")

In response to the use of the Eureka Flag at violent protests in recent times, efforts have been made by some, including federal Labor MP Catherine King, to reclaim it for more progressive causes.

=== Late 19th century – present ===
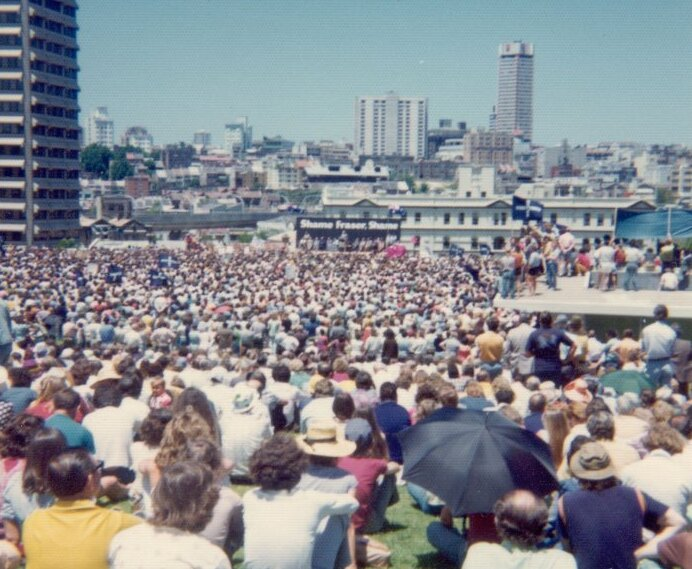
Australian Labor Party policy launch before a huge crowd in the Sydney Domain on 24 November 1975. Eureka Flags can be seen in the crowd and on the tribune.

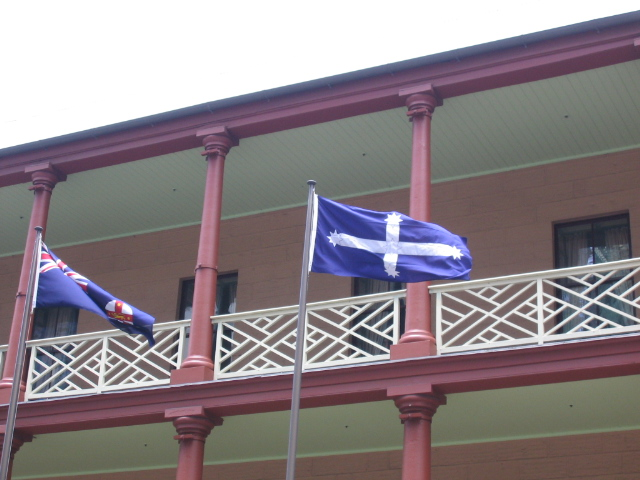
NSW Parliament Building, Macquarie Street, Sydney, December 2004

There is an oral tradition that Eureka Flags were on display at a seaman's union protest against the use of cheap Asian labour on ships at Circular Quay in 1878. In August 1890, a crowd of 30,000 protesters gathered at the Yarra Bank in Melbourne under a platform draped with the flag in a show of solidarity with maritime workers. A similar flag was flown prominently above the camp at Barcaldine during the 1891 Australian shearers' strike.

After the First World War and the Great Depression, the Eureka Flag once again returned to the public domain, being adopted by the New Guard and "the radical left wing of the Australian Labor Party and the Communist Party" in the 1930s.

In 1948, a procession of 3,000 members of the Communist-affiliated Eureka Youth League and allied unionists led by a Eureka Flag bearer marched through the streets of Melbourne on the occasion of the 94th anniversary of the Eureka Stockade. The same year, headlines in the Melbourne Argus stated, "Police in serious clash with strikers" and "Battle over Eureka flag" following a violent clash between about 500 strikers and police during a procession on St Patrick's Day in Brisbane. The marchers were singing "It's a Great Day for the Irish" and "Advance, Australia Fair" whilst carrying shamrock-shaped anti-government placards and a coffin with the label "Trade Unionism."

Readers were also told, "Conspicuous in the procession was a Eureka flag, a replica of the flag Peter Lalor's followers carried at the Eureka Stockade in 1854." It was reported that two protesters were injured and five arrested "In a fight for the Eureka flag" where the "strikers resisted, and blows were struck. Police, caught up in the melee, drew batons and used them."

The Eureka Flag was used by supporters of Gough Whitlam after he was dismissed as prime minister. In 1979, the Northcote City Council began flying the Eureka Flag from its Town Hall to mark the 125th anniversary of the uprising and continued until at least 1983.

During a 1983 royal tour, a republican supporter informally presented a small Eureka Flag to Diana, Princess of Wales, who did not recognise it. The event prompted a cartoon of the royal couple with Charles, Prince of Wales, observing, "Mummy will not be pleased."

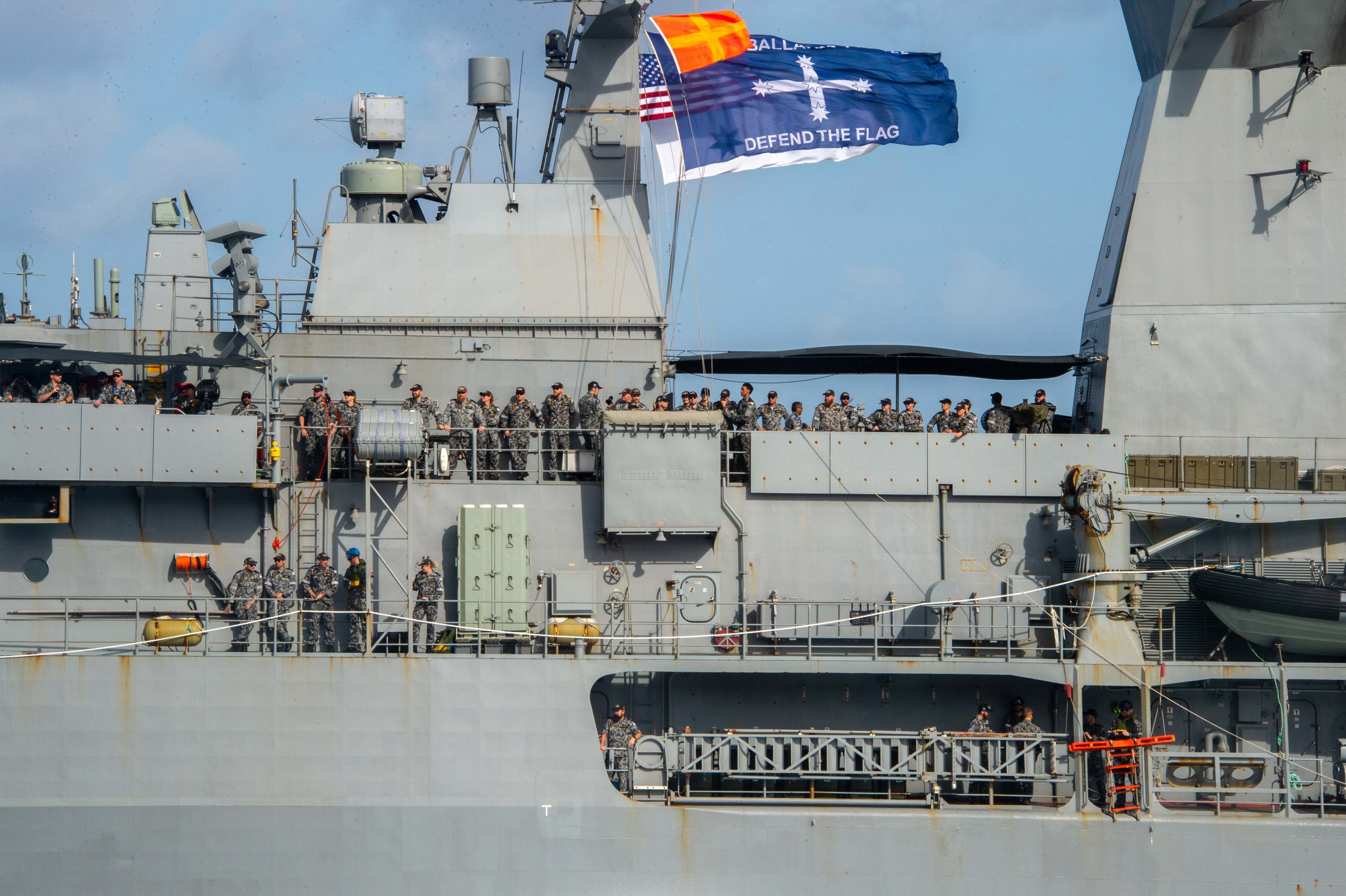
HMAS Ballarat flying the Eureka Flag and other flags, 2021

To commemorate the 2004 Eureka sesquicentenary, the Eureka Flag flew at every state and territory parliament; the federal senate; City Hill, Canberra; and from the Sydney Harbour Bridge. Deputy Prime Minister John Anderson made the flag a federal election issue that year. He was opposed to flying it at Parliament House, Canberra to mark the occasion, stating: "I think people have tried to make too much of the Eureka Stockade ... trying to give it a credibility and standing that it probably doesn't enjoy."

The Eureka Flag has been adopted by a variety of civic and political organisations, including the City of Ballarat and Federation University, which use elements or stylised versions of the flag in their official logo. Several trade unions use it, including the CFMEU and ETU. The Eureka Flag is often informally flown on-site at building and other construction sites by members of the construction, forestry, maritime, mining and energy unions. It is deemed to be a trade union symbol under the Commonwealth building code, which prohibits using any "building association logos, mottos or indicia" on property, clothing or equipment that suggests union membership is required to work on government-funded projects. In 2022, the Federal Court of Australia ruled that companies subject to the legislation must ensure the Eureka Flag is not displayed at affected worksites. The flag flies permanently over the Melbourne Trades Hall and the Ballarat Trades Hall. The Prospectors and Miners Association of Victoria use it as their official flag. In 2016, it was formally incorporated into the official logo of the Australia First Party with the Australian Electoral Commission receiving submissions opposing the inclusion of the Eureka Flag.

Sporting clubs have made use of the Eureka Flag, including the Melbourne Victory and Melbourne Rebels. Melbourne Victory supporters adopted it as a club flag for the foundation year in 2004. It was briefly banned at A-League games by the Football Federation of Australia but rescinded in the face of criticism from the Victorian general public. The Football Federation of Australia claimed that the ban was "unintentional."

HMAS Ballarat occasionally flies the Eureka Flag from its mainstay alongside the Australian White Ensign

=== Standardised design ===
The standardised Eureka Flag design

The standardised Eureka Flag most often seen in circulation today is an enhanced and different version from the original specimen with blue key lines around each of five equal stars. It is frequently made in the proportions of 20:13. The Eureka Flag features the stars of the Southern Cross, a constellation more visible to viewers in the Southern Hemisphere. The stars are arranged differently from the astronomical alignment of the Southern Cross. The "middle" star (Epsilon Crucis) in the constellation is off-centre and near the edge of the "diamond." In contrast, the Eureka Flag features a star in the centre of the white cross.

==== Eureka Flag bills ====
A bill was tabled in federal parliament on 23 March 2004 by Victorian Senator Gavin Marshall to "amend the Flags Act 1953 to recognise the Eureka Flag as an official flag of Australia, and for related purposes". A mirror bill had previously been introduced into the House of Representatives by the member for Ballarat Catherine King in 2003.

First floated by the Eureka Stockade Memorial Trust in 1997, the proposed amendment was moved ahead of the impending sesquicentenary of the Eureka Stockade in 2004. It sought to officially recognise the standardised design and put the legality of flying the Eureka Flag from public buildings beyond all doubt, with petitions presented to both houses of parliament calling for such recognition under the Flags Act. King stated in parliament that former immigration minister Al Grassby had attested to a precedent where the Eureka Flag was flown from the old parliament house in 1972.

The Australian Labor Party indicated support for the move, with opposition leader Mark Latham saying he was: "pledged to fly it [the Eureka Flag] above [Parliament House] Canberra if he became Prime Minister."

=== Derivatives and variants ===
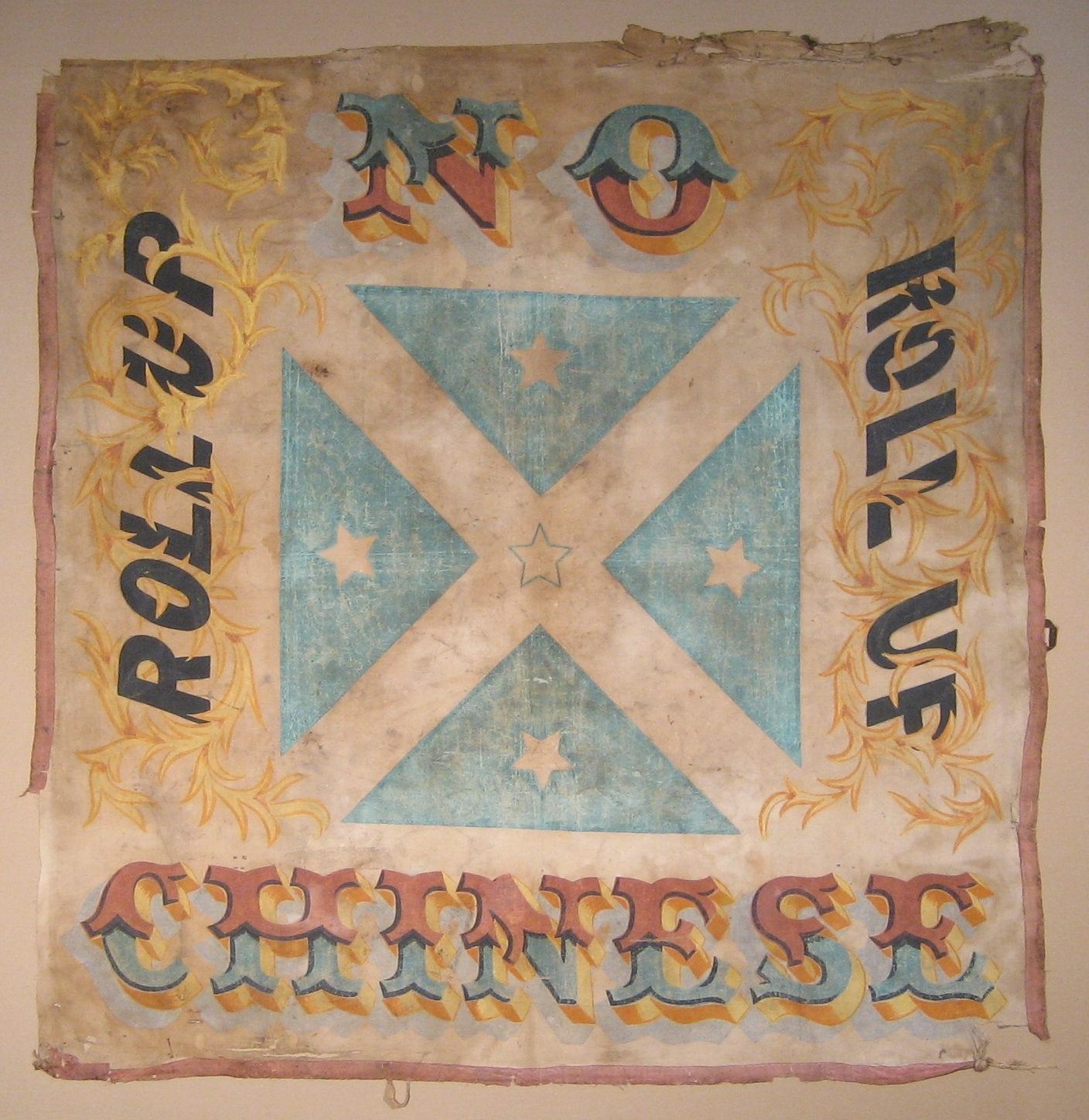
The Roll Up Banner

The Lambing Flat riots were a series of violent anti-Chinese demonstrations in the Burrangong region in New South Wales, Australia. The miner's local vigilante committee was known as the Miner's Protection League. On 30 June 1861, seven hundred miners led by a brass band went about sacking the grog shops, which were havens for thieves, before turning their attention to the Chinese section. Most fled, but two Chinese persons who stayed to fight were killed, and ten others were badly injured. There were further incidents throughout 1861, with the Chinese who returned targeted. Another large gathering was held on Bastille Day, 14 July. The demonstrators were eventually read the riot act and had shots fired over their heads before being dispersed by mounted troopers. The trouble gradually subsided as more soldiers and marines were sent from Sydney. In 1870, the town was renamed in honour of former New South Wales governor, Sir John Young.

The Lambing Flat banner was painted on a tent flap and is now on display at the Lambing Flat Museum. It bears a Southern Cross superimposed over a St Andrew's cross with the inscription "ROLL UP. ROLL UP. NO CHINESE." It has been claimed that the banner, which served as an advertisement for a public meeting that presaged the Lambing Flat riots, was inspired by the Eureka Flag.

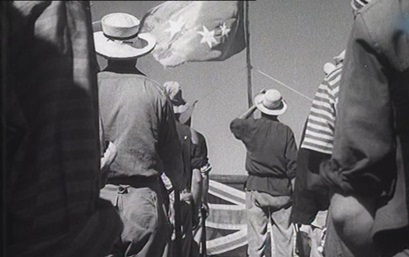
Oath swearing scene from the 1949 motion picture Eureka Stockade featuring the star-spangled Eureka flag

According to Whitney Smith, writing in 1975, the Eureka Flag:

... perhaps because of its association with labour riots and a time of political crisis in Australian history, was long forgotten. A century after it was first hoisted, however, Australian authors began to recognise that it had been an inspiration, both in spirit and design, for many banners up to and including the current official civil and state flags of the nation.

Before the Eureka Flag went on permanent display to the public, it was often featured with no cross and free-floating stars as per the Australian national flag, such as in the 1949 motion picture Eureka Stockade starring Chips Rafferty.

There is also a variant based on the red flag that is occasionally seen.

== Other Eureka flags ==
During his investigation in the late nineteenth century, William Withers found two women, Mrs Morgan and Mrs Oliver, who claimed to have sewn a starry flag at the time, but "they could not positively identify it as the one flown at Eureka." John Wilson recalls that the Eureka Flag was taken down by Thomas Kennedy at sundown on 2 December 1854 and stored in his tent "for safe keeping."

When the government forces arrived in the early hours of the following day, it was already flying above the stockade. Frank Cayley has concluded that: "Wilson's flag was undoubtedly one of several flags, in various designs, that were made at Eureka." His colleague and fellow Eureka investigator, Melbourne journalist Len Fox, has also stated: "Flags were popular on the goldfields, and it may well be that among the diggers at Ballarat were smaller (and different) versions of the Eureka flag."

Concerning the provenance of the star-spangled Eureka Flag, Withers also interviewed police officer John McNeil, who recalled a meeting at Bakery Hill where Robert McCandlish "unbuttoned his coat and took out and unfurled a light blue flag with some stars on it, but there was no cross on it."

=== Eureka Jack Mystery ===
Extract of Argus report, 4 December 1854

Since 2009, various theories have emerged, based on the Argus account of the fall of the Eureka Stockade, and an affidavit sworn by Private Hugh King on 7 December 1854 that mentions a flag being seized from a prisoner detained at the stockade, concerning whether the rebel garrison also flew a Union Jack, known as the Eureka Jack. The day after the battle readers of the Argus were told that:

The flag of the diggers, "The Southern Cross," as well as the "Union Jack," which they had to hoist underneath, were captured by the foot police.

In his Eureka: The Unfinished Revolution, Peter FitzSimons has stated:

In my opinion, this report of the Union Jack being on the same flagpole as the flag of the Southern Cross is not credible. There is no independent corroborating report in any other newspaper, letter, diary or book, and one would have expected Raffaello Carboni, for one, to have mentioned it had that been the case. The paintings of the flag ceremony and battle by Charles Doudiet, who was in Ballarat at the time, depicts no Union Jack. During the trial for high treason, the flying of the Southern Cross was an enormous issue, yet no mention was ever made of the Union Jack flying beneath.

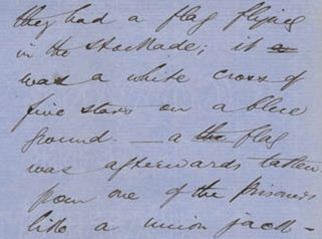
Extract of the affidavit by Hugh King, 7 December 1854

However, Hugh King, who was a private in the 40th (the 2nd Somersetshire) Regiment of Foot, swore in a signed contemporaneous affidavit that he recalled:

... three or four hundred yards a heavy fire from the stockade was opened on the troops and me. When the fire was opened on us we received orders to fire. I saw some of the 40th wounded lying on the ground but I cannot say that it was before the fire on both sides. I think some of the men in the stockade should – they had a flag flying in the stockade; it was a white cross of five stars on a blue ground. – flag was afterwards taken from one of the prisoners like a union jack – we fired and advanced on the stockade, when we jumped over, we were ordered to take all we could prisoners ...

During the committal hearings for the Eureka rebels, there would be another Argus report dated 9 December 1854 concerning the seizure of a second flag at the stockade in the following terms:

The great topic of interest to-day has been the proceedings in reference to the state prisoners now confined in the Camp. As the evidence of the witnesses in these cases is more reliable information than that afforded by most reports, I shall endeavor to give you an abstract of it.

Hugh King was called upon to give further testimony live under oath in the matter of Timothy Hayes. In doing so, he went into more detail than in his written affidavit, as the report states that the Union Jack-like flag was found:

... rollen up in the breast of a[n] [unidentified] prisoner. He [King] advanced with the rest, firing as they advanced ... several shots were fired on them after they entered [the stockade]. He observed the prisoner [Hayes] brought down from a tent in custody.

Military historian and author of Eureka Stockade: A Ferocious and Bloody Battle Gregory Blake, concedes that the rebels may have flown two battle flags as they claimed to be defending their British rights. Blake leaves open the possibility that the flag being carried by the prisoner had been souvenired from the flag pole as the routed garrison was fleeing the stockade. Once taken by Constable John King, the Eureka Flag was placed beneath his tunic in the same fashion as the suspected Union Jack was found on the prisoner.

In 1896, Sergeant John McNeil, who was at the battle, recalled shredding a flag at the Spencer Street Barracks in Melbourne at the time. He claimed it was the Eureka Flag that he had torn down. However, Blake believes it may have been the mystery Eureka Jack.

Another theory is that the Eureka Jack was an 11th-hour response to divided loyalties in the rebel camp. (Note: Peter Lalor made a blunder by choosing "Vinegar Hill" – the site of a battle during the Irish Rebellion of 1798 – as the rebel password. This led to waning support for the Eureka Rebellion as news that the issue of Irish independence had become involved began to circulate.)

The oath swearing ceremony in Eureka Stockade (1949) features the star-spangled Eureka Flag with the Union Jack beneath. In The Revolt at Eureka, part of a 1958 illustrated history series for students, the artist Ray Wenban remained faithful to the first reports of the battle with his rendition featuring two flags flying above the Eureka Stockade.

In 2013, the Australian Flag Society announced a worldwide quest and a $10,000 reward for more information and materials relating to the Eureka Jack mystery. The AFS also released a commemorative artwork, "Fall Back with the Eureka Jack" illustrating Gregory Blake's theory for the 160th anniversary of the battle in 2014.

== Modern versions ==
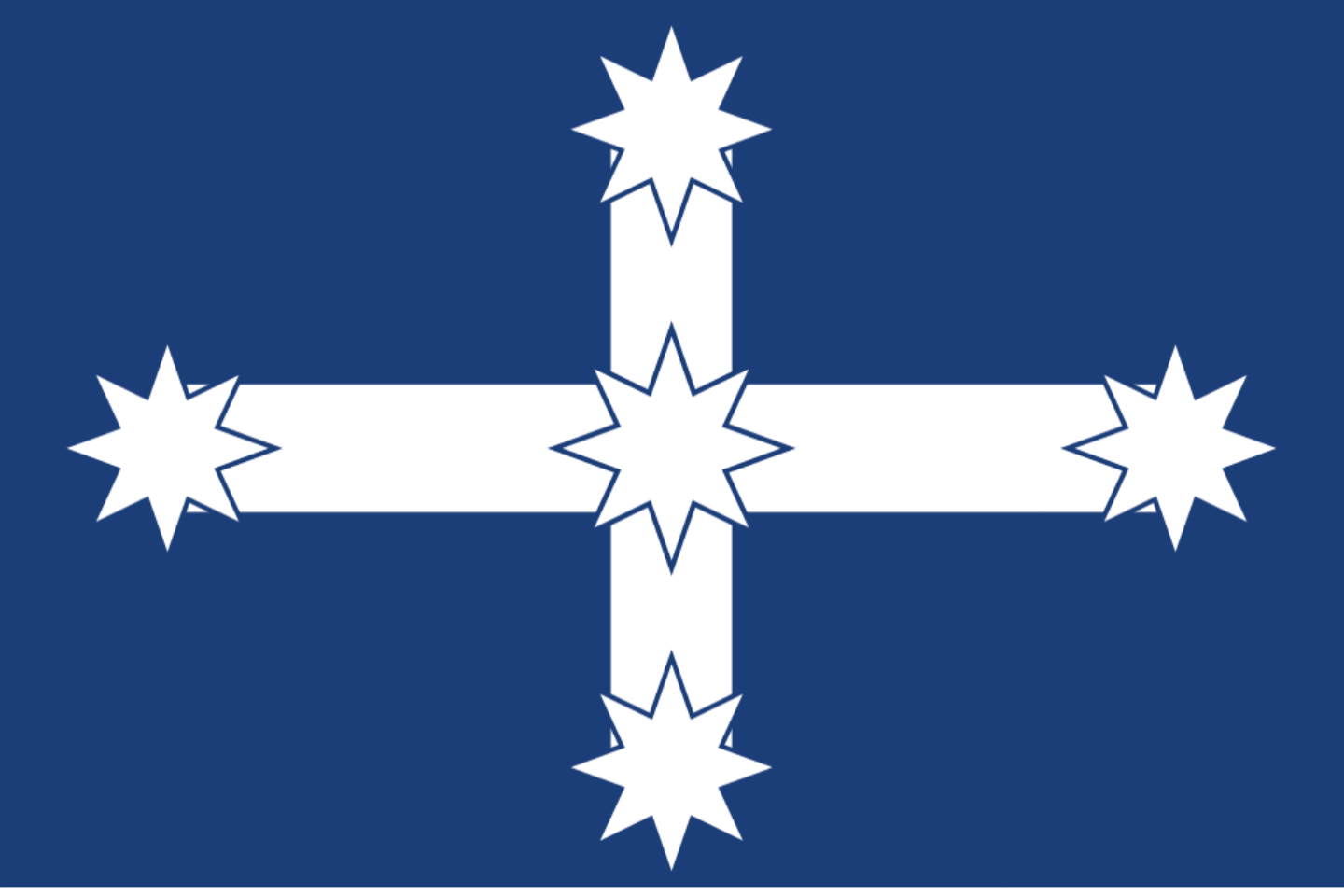
A Eureka Flag adjusted to the global standard ratio of 2:3

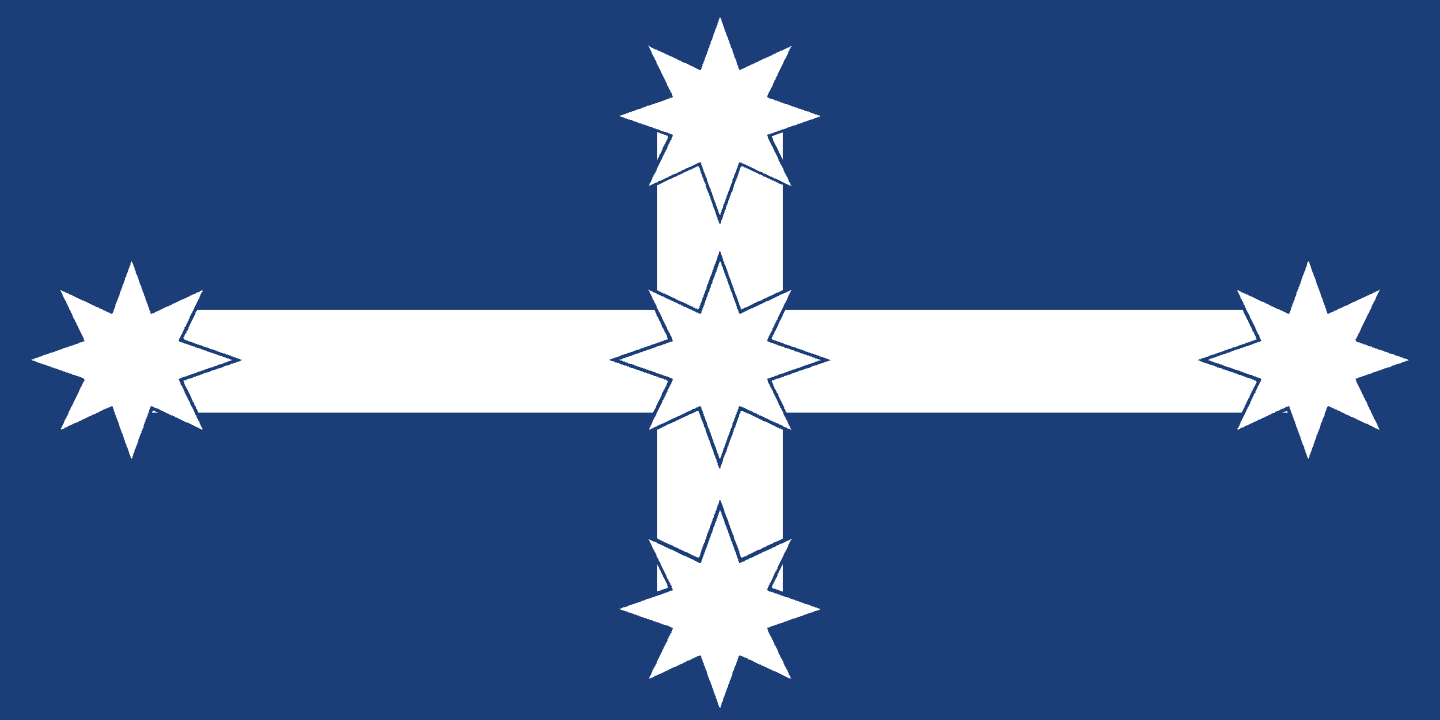
A Eureka Flag adjusted to the Australian standard ratio of 1:2 as sold by most manufacturers

A 1:2 variant of the Eureka Flag in the colours of the Aboriginal flag

A variant of the Eureka flag with a red-black diagonal bicolour as the background used by Anarchist communists

A green Eureka flag used by protestors against coal seam exploitation

== See also ==
- Australian Flag Society
- Silver fern flag
- Southern Cross Flag

== Bibliography ==
=== Historiography ===
==== General histories ====
- Barnard, Marjorie (1962). A History of Australia. Sydney: Angus and Robertson.
- Clark, Manning (1987). A History of Australia. Vol. IV: The Earth Abideth Forever. Cartlon: Melbourne University Press. ISBN 978-0-52-284147-3.

==== Surveys of the period ====
- O'Brien, Bob (1992). Massacre at Eureka: The untold story. Kew: Australian Scholarly Publishing. ISBN 978-1-87-560604-7.

==== Local histories ====
- Bate, Weston (1978). Lucky City, The First Generation at Ballarat, 1851–1901. Carlton: Melbourne University Press. ISBN 978-0-52-284157-2.
- Withers, William (1999). History of Ballarat and Some Ballarat Reminiscences. Ballarat: Ballarat Heritage Service. ISBN 978-1-87-647878-0.

==== Popular histories ====
===== Pictorial histories =====
- Wenban, Ray (1958). The Revolt at Eureka. Pictorial Social Studies. Vol. 16. Sydney: Australian Visual Education.

===== Narrative histories =====
- FitzSimons, Peter (2012). Eureka: The Unfinished Revolution. Sydney: Random House Australia. ISBN 978-1-74-275525-0.
- Kieza, Grantlee (2014). Sons of the Southern Cross. Sydney: HarperCollins. ISBN 978-0-73-333156-5.

==== Military histories ====
- Blake, Gregory (2012). Eureka Stockade: A ferocious and bloody battle. Newport: Big Sky Publishing. ISBN 978-1-92-213204-8.
- Blake, Gregory (2009). To Pierce the Tyrant's Heart: The Battle for the Eureka Stockade. Loftus, ACT: Australian Army History Unit. ISBN 978-0-98-047532-6.

==== Political histories ====
- Gold, Geoffrey (1977). Eureka: Rebellion Beneath the Southern Cross. Adelaide: Rigby. ISBN 978-0-27-002562-0.
- Fox, Len (1982). Broad left, Narrow left. Potts Point: The Author. ISBN 978-0-95-981049-3.
- Murray, Les (1978). The Peasant Mandarin. St Lucia: University of Queensland Press. ISBN 978-0-70-221217-8.
- Spence, W.G. (1909). Australia's Awakening. Sydney and Melbourne: The Worker Trustees.

==== Feminist histories ====
- Wright, Clare (2013). The Forgotten Rebels of Eureka. Melbourne: The Text Publishing Company. ISBN 978-1-92-218254-8.

==== Other specialised studies ====
- Darlington, Robert (1983). Eric Campbell and the New Guard. Sydney: Kangaroo Press. ISBN 978-0-94-992434-6.

=== Biography ===
- Blake, Les (1979). Peter Lalor: The Man from Eureka. Belmont, Victoria: Neptune Press. ISBN 978-0-90-913140-1.

=== Vexillology ===
- Australian Flags (3rd ed.). Canberra: Australian Government Publishing Service. 2006. ISBN 0-642-47134-7.
- Cayley, Frank (1966). Flag of Stars. Adelaide: Rigby. ISBN 978-9-04-010451-0.
- Fox, Len (1973). Eureka and its flag. Canterbury, Victoria: Mullaya Publications. ISBN 978-0-85-914004-1.
- Fox, Len (1992). The Eureka Flag. Potts Point: The Author. ISBN 978-0-95-892395-8.
- Fox, Len (1963). The strange story of the Eureka flag. Darlinghurst: The Author.
- Kwan, Elizabeth (2006). Flag and Nation: Australians and their National Flags since 1901. Sydney: University of New South Wales. ISBN 0-86840-567-1.
- Smith, Whitney (1975a). Flags Through the Ages and Across the World. Maidenhead: McGraw-Hill. ISBN 978-0-07-059093-9.
- Smith, Whitney (1975b). The Flag Book of the United States: The Story of the Stars and Stripes and the Flags of the Fifty States. New York: William Morrow. ISBN 978-0-68-802977-7.
- Wickham, Dorothy; Gervasoni, Clare; D'Angri, Val (2000). The Eureka Flag: Our Starry Banner. Ballarat: Ballarat Heritage Services. ISBN 978-1-87-647813-1.

=== Primary sources ===
==== Memoirs ====
- Carboni, Raffaello (1855). The Eureka Stockade: The Consequence of Some Pirates Wanting a Quarterdeck Rebellion. Melbourne: J. P. Atkinson and Co. – via Project Gutenberg.
- Craig, William (1903). My Adventures on the Australian Goldfields. London: Cassell and Company.
- Nicholls, H.R. "Reminiscences of the Eureka Stockade", The Centennial Magazine: An Australian Monthly, (May 1890) (available in an annual compilation; Vol. II: August 1889 to July 1890).
- R.E. Johns Papers, MS10075, Manuscript Collection, La Trobe Library, State Library of Victoria.
- Wilson, John W. (1963). The Starry Banner of Australia: An Episode in Colonial History. Brisbane: Brian Donaghey.

==== Letters ====
- Frederick, Riley (13 January 1912). "The state of the Eureka Flag". Letter to Frederick Riley Sr – via National Library of Australia.

==== Affidavits ====
- King, Hugh (7 December 1854). "Deposition of Witness: Hugh King". Archived from the original on 12 November 2013 – via Public Record Office Victoria.

==== Official reports ====
- Thomas, John Wellesley (3 December 1854). Captain Thomas reports on the attack on the Eureka Stockade to the Major Adjutant General (Report). Archived from the original on 4 April 2019 – via Public Record Office Victoria.
- Thomas, John Wellesley (14 December 1854). Capt. Thomas' report - Flag captured (Report). Colonial Secretary's Office. Archived from the original on 12 April 2019 – via Public Record Office Victoria.
- Three Despatches From Sir Charles Hotham. Melbourne: Public Record Office. 1981.

==== Other contemporaneous reports ====
===== The Argus =====
- "By Express. Fatal Collision at Ballaarat". The Argus. Melbourne. 4 December 1854. p. 5 – via Trove.
- "GEELONG. (FROM OUR OWN CORRESPONDENT.)". The Argus. Melbourne. 5 December 1854. p. 4 – via Trove.
- "BALLAARAT". The Argus. Melbourne. 9 December 1854. p. 5 – via Trove.
- "POLICE IN SERIOUS CLASH WITH STRIKERS: Battle over Eureka flag". The Argus. Melbourne. 18 March 1948. p. 3 – via Trove.

===== The Age =====
- "AFFAIRS AT BALLARAT". The Age. Melbourne. 28 November 1854. p. 5 – via Trove.
- "BALLARAT. (From the Correspondent of the Geelong Advertiser.)". The Age. Melbourne. 4 December 1854. p. 5 – via Trove.
- "GEELONG. (FROM OUR OWN CORRESPONDENT.)". The Argus. Melbourne. 5 December 1854. p. 4 – via Trove.

===== The Sydney Morning Herald =====
- "CONTINUATION OF THE STATE TRIALS". The Sydney Morning Herald. Sydney. 5 March 1855. p. 3 – via Trove.

===== Melbourne Herald =====
- "HISTORIC TREE STUMP: Where Eureka Stockaders Discussed Grievances". The Herald. Melbourne. 9 June 1931. p. 14 – via Trove.

===== North Western Courier =====
- "News of the Day". North Western Courier. Narrabri. 13 July 1931. p. 3 – via Trove.

==== Other documents ====
Ballarat Reform League Charter, 11 November 1854, VPRS 4066/P Unit 1, November no. 69, VA 466 Governor (including Lieutenant Governor 1851–1855 and Governor's Office), Public Record Office Victoria.

=== Reference books ===
- Corfield, Justin; Wickham, Dorothy; Gervasoni, Clare, eds. (2004). The Eureka Encyclopedia. Ballarat: Ballarat Heritage Services. ISBN 978-1-87-647861-2.
- MacFarlane, Ian (1995). Eureka from the Official Records. Melbourne: Public Record Office Victoria. ISBN 978-0-73-066011-8.

=== Journals ===
- Historical Studies: Eureka Supplement (2nd ed.). Melbourne: Melbourne University Press. 1965.
- Sunter, Anne Beggs (2003). "Contested Memories of Eureka: Museum Interpretations of the Eureka Stockade". Labour History (85): 29–45. doi:10.2307/27515926. ISSN 0023-6942. JSTOR 27515926.

=== Historical magazines ===
- "The Defence of the Eureka Stockade". Look and Learn. London: Fleetway Publications Ltd. 14 February 1970.

=== Other media reports ===
==== Eureka commemoration ====
- Henderson, Fiona (23 December 2014). "Reward offered for evidence of battle's Union Jack flag". The Courier. Ballarat. p. 5.

==== Opinion pieces ====
- Huxley, John (26 January 2016). "Eureka? An answer to that Jack in the corner gets a little bit warmer". Sydney Morning Herald. Sydney.

==== Society and culture ====
- Cowie, Tom (22 October 2013). "$10,000 reward to track down 'other' Eureka flag". The Courier. Ballarat. p. 3.
- "Is the Eureka Flag racist? Unley Council rejects request to fly Eureka flag amid racism concerns". News Corp Australia. Sydney. 28 October 2020.

=== Seminars ===
- Beggs-Sunter, Anne (2004). "Contesting the Flag: the mixed messages of the Eureka Flag". In Mayne, Alan (ed.). Eureka: reappraising an Australian Legend. Paper originally presented at Eureka Seminar, University of Melbourne History Department, 1 December 2004. Perth, Australia: Network Books. ISBN 978-1-92-084536-0.
- Beggs-Sunter, Anne (2014). Contesting the making of the Eureka Flag. Australian Historical Association Conference. Brisbane.

=== Interviews ===
- "Historians discuss Eureka legend". Lateline. 7 May 2001. Australian Broadcasting Corporation.
