= Currer =

Currer is a surname, and on occasion a given name, and may refer to:

- Frances Mary Richardson Currer (1785–1861), British heiress and book collector
- Herbert Currer (born 1916), South African lawn bowler and footballer
- Ian Currer, author of books on parasailing, windsurfing, and kitesurfing
- Currer Bell, pseudonym of Charlotte Bronte.
- Currer French (sometimes Francis Currer French, 1772–1837), English novelist of the Regency period

== See also ==
- Currier (disambiguation)
