= Currier (disambiguation) =

A currier is a specialist in the leather processing industry.

Currier may also refer to:

- Currier (surname), a surname (including a list of people with the name)
- USS Currier (DE-700), a former destroyer escort of the United States Navy
- Currier House (disambiguation), various buildings
- Currier Museum of Art, Manchester, New Hampshire

== See also ==
- Rauhut–Currier reaction
- Courier (disambiguation)
