= The Westbound Train =

1899 short story by Willa Cather

- Short story by Willa Cather
- Country: United States
- Language: English
- Genre: Short story

Publication
- Published in: Capital City Courier
- Publication type: Newspaper
- Publication date: September 1899

"The Westbound Train" is a short story by Willa Cather. It was first published in Courier in September 1899.

== Plot summary ==
Mrs Johnston stops at Cheyenne, Wyoming train station to collect a ticket for her next train to San Francisco. She has come all the way from New York City to join her husband, a railroad official. However, the Station Agent claims he has already given her ticket to a Mrs Johnston, with confirmation by telegram from Mr Johnston, and that she might write her a note. The other woman's reply says that her name is actually Johnson (without a 't') and that Mr Johnston is coming to pick her up at Cheyenne so they can travel to San Francisco together. Infuriated, Sybil decides to take a train back to New York City; she thinks her husband has been cheating on her, and that this is the ultimate insult. However, she is met by her husband and he explains Sally is a friend whom she had met at a wedding sometime later. The couple make up and meet the other woman.

== Characters ==
- Reginald Johnston, 'a railroad official'.
- Sybil Johnston, Reginald's wife. Her maiden name is Ingrahame.
- Station Agent
- Messenger Boy
- Mrs Sally Johnson. Her maiden name is Toppinger. Her husband died on a boat excursion. She is blond and blue-eyed; Syvil deems her 'common'.
- Margaret Villers
- Alberta Frick
- Cicely Fanshawe
- Marchesi

== References to other works ==
- Sybil fancies Sally and her husband to gossip about her as characters in novels by Honoré de Balzac do.

== References to actual history ==
- Sybil dismisses Sally's letter as Volapük, a trendy language at the time.
