= Currier House =

Currier House may refer to:

- Currier House (Harvard College), Cambridge, Massachusetts
- Currier House (Davenport, Iowa)
- Currier House (Almont, Michigan)
- Capt. Jonathan Currier House, South Hampton, New Hampshire
