= Courrier =

Courrier may refer to:

- Courrier International, a Paris-based French weekly newspaper
- Courrier des États-Unis, a French language newspaper published by French immigrants in New York
- Courrier d'Ethiopie, a French language weekly newspaper published in Addis Ababa during 1913-1936

== See also ==
- Courier (disambiguation)
- Courrier sud (disambiguation)
- Courrière, a village in the municipality of Assesse in the province of Namur, Belgium
- Courrières, a commune in the Pas-de-Calais department in the Nord-Pas-de-Calais region of France
