= Charles Doudiet =

Swiss-born Canadian artist and digger

Charles Alphonse Doudiet (1832 – 13 June 1913) was a Swiss-born Canadian artist and digger present at the Eureka Stockade, Ballarat, in the British Colony of Victoria (now Australia), in 1854. His sketchbook, discovered by his descendants in 1996, has provided contemporary images of events connected to the Eureka Rebellion, that were important for the authentication of the original Eureka Flag.

== Early life ==
Charles Doudiet was born in Geneva, Switzerland. In 1844, at the age of twelve, Doudiet migrated from Switzerland to the predominantly French-speaking Canada East portion of the British colony Province of Canada. His father, Reverend Jacques-Frederic Doudiet, worked with the French Canadian Missionary Society, a job that required much travelling, which the Reverend documented in a series of sketchbooks.

When 20-year-old Charles Doudiet left his home in Belle Riviere near Montreal, he carried a sketchbook like his father, to document his travels. By riverboat, train, then the clipper Magnolia, Doudiet travelled to Melbourne, attracted by the Victorian Gold Rush. Onboard the clipper, Doudiet met Henry Ross, from the neighboring Upper Canada portion of the Province of Canada, who was also headed to the gold fields.

== Eureka Rebellion ==
On the diggings at Ballarat, Doudiet continued to document events, including the burning of Bentley's Pub on 17 October 1854.

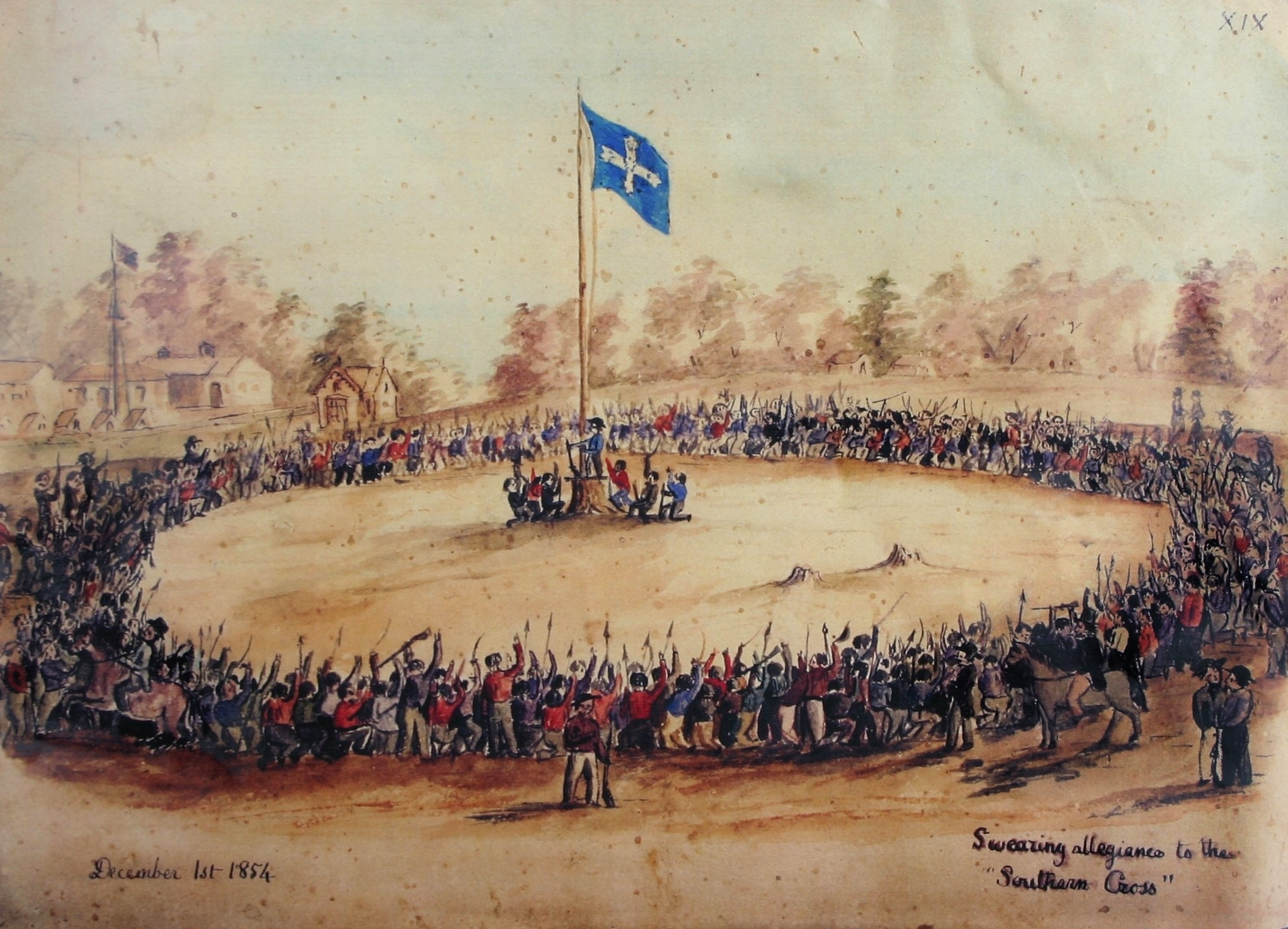
Bakery Hill on December 1, 1854: Swearing Allegiance to the "Southern Cross" by Charles Doudiet.

Doudiet's drawing Swearing Allegiance to the "Southern Cross" is an important historical work because it documents the meeting on Bakery Hill on 1 December 1854. Prior to the discovery of the sketchbook, there was no certain proof that the flag held by the Ballarat Fine Art Gallery was the original Eureka Flag, as there were several different southern cross flag designs used on the gold fields at that time.

His work Eureka Slaughter shows the troops lined up attacking the stockade on 3 December 1854. Accompanying the sketch is a descriptive passage with the footnote: "Joyce, Penny and Fletcher along with myself carried Ross to the Star where he died in great pain at about 2am on the 5th". This refers to fellow Canadian Captain Henry Ross, whom many believe to be the Eureka Flag's designer, who was carried to the Star Hotel after he was mortally wounded in the battle at dawn on 3 December 1854.

== Later life and legacy ==
Doudiet's Melbourne sketchbook ends in 1855, and soon after, Doudiet returned to Canada and married in March 1857. After several years, he studied theology at Queen's College, Kingston, Ontario, and was ordained as a minister in Montreal in 1869. He served several congregations before dying in Hallowell, Maine, on 13 June 1913.

After descendants found Doudiet's sketchbook in an attic in 1996, it was put up for sale by auction at Christie's. Money was raised by the Ballarat Fine Art Gallery, whose successful bid of AU$220,000 (equivalent to $420,000 in 2022) allowed them to add the sketchbook to its historical collection connected to Ballarat and the Eureka Stockade.

In January 2012, an article in The Age newspaper discusses an unsupported accusation, brought forward to the reporter by an unnamed person who claimed that his own poor health made him unable "to pursue this matter" himself, that Swearing Allegiance to the Southern Cross may be a forgery. The accusation was not backed with any evidence, nor even a suggestion of something particular having been revealed to the accuser, and the reporter concluded "I don't for a minute believe that Doudiet's watercolours are fake...".

== See also ==
- Eureka Flag
- Eureka Stockade
