= Sandusky Automobile Company =

Defunct American motor vehicle manufacturer

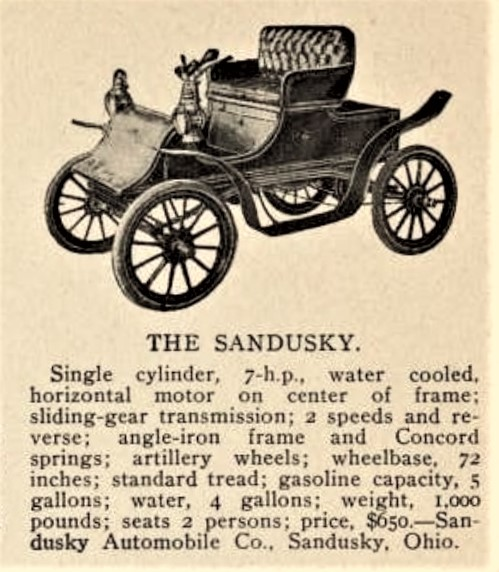
- 1904 Sandusky Runabout - Autos of 1904 - Frank Leslie's Monthly
- Formerly: Sandusky Automobile Manufacturing Company
- Founded: 1902; 124 years ago
- Founder: James J. Hinde
- Defunct: 1905; 121 years ago
- Fate: Bankruptcy
- Headquarters: Sandusky, Ohio, United States
- Products: Automobiles
- Production output: unknown (1902-1904)
- Brands: Sandusky, Courier

The Sandusky Automobile Company was an automobile manufacturer in Sandusky, Ohio, from 1902 to 1904. It was located at 1114 Camp Street.

== History ==
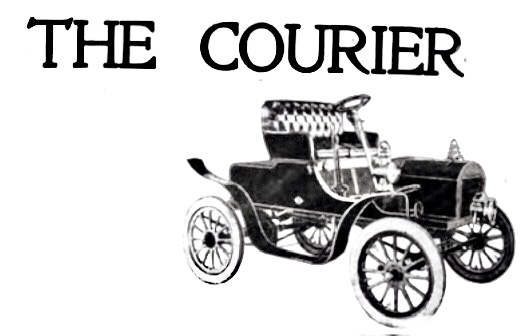
Sandusky Courier (1904-1905) Single-cylinder engine with 1583 cc and 7 HP

The Sandusky Automobile Company was founded by James J. Hinde who "had been a successful paper manufacturer who entered the automobile business with the belief that a small, reasonably priced car could capture a mass market."

This concept influenced Henry Ford. The Lucas County/Maumee Valley Historical Society concluded that "the Sandusky Automobile Company may be far more significant because of the passing interest of Henry Ford than for the number of cars they built and sold. At the time Ford was not yet a manufacturing magnate. He was a successful engineer turned inventor, who had given up his profession to enter the automotive field." Although the company did not succeed, James J. Hinde made "conceptual contributions" to "the production strategy of Henry Ford."

== Models ==
The company made an open runabout car, seating two people. The 1903 model had a "piano-box body, and a rounded bonnet front on top of the dash", with a 5-horsepower single-cylinder engine water-cooled by natural gravity circulation. Power was transmitted to the rear axle by two chains. Weight of the car was 600 lb (270 kg). This car was exhibited at the New York Automobile Show at Madison Square Garden in 1903.

The 1904 model had a one-cylinder, 7 hp, water-cooled engine, a planetary transmission and a sliding gear suspension. It had a 65" wheelbase. The maximum speed was 25 miles per hour = 40 km/h. One version, called the Sandusky, was advertised at $650, in a review of 88 current models in Frank Leslie's Popular Monthly.

Sandusky also made a somewhat more expensive car, the Courier, with similar specifications, but a steering wheel instead of a steering lever. The 1904 model was advertised at $800, and at $700. The 1905 Courier F was a two-seater roadster that weighed 1,100 pounds (500 kg), had a 70-inch wheelbase, wooden body, and steel frame. The engine was one-cylinder and 7 horsepower, with a transmission that had two forward speeds and reverse.

- Sandusky Courier F
- Sandusky Courier H

== See also ==
- List of defunct United States automobile manufacturers
- Veteran vehicles
