= Henry Ross =

Canadian-born gold miner in colonial Australia (1829–1854)

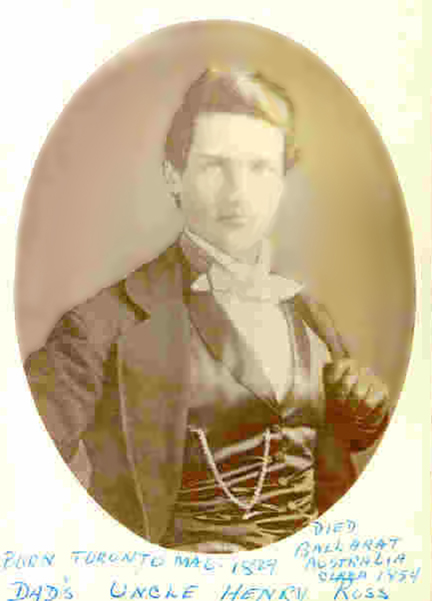
- Henry Ross, in a photo displayed by the Bendigo Fine Art Gallery
- Born: 1829; York, Upper Canada, British North America (Note: Present-day: Old Toronto, Ontario, Canada)
- Died: 5 December 1854 (aged 25); Ballarat, Colony of Victoria (Note: Present-day: Ballarat, Victoria, Australia)
- Occupation: Gold miner
- Known for: Eureka Rebellion

Henry Ross (1829 – 5 December 1854) was a Canadian-Australian gold miner who died in the Eureka Rebellion at the Ballarat gold fields in the British Colony of Victoria, now the state of Victoria in Australia. Ross is particularly remembered for his part in the creation of the rebel miners' flag, since named the Eureka Flag.

Ross was born in Toronto, in the British colony of Upper Canada which had amalgamated into the colonial Province of Canada by the time he departed. He became a gold miner in California during the gold rush and probably arrived at Melbourne on the Magnolia in November 1852, along with Charles Doudiet and three other Canadians.

Raffaello Carboni, chronicler of the Eureka Rebellion, wrote that "Captain Ross, of Toronto, was the bridegroom of our flag". The flag, called the Southern Cross flag (for the celestial asterism of the same name), was created as a symbol by miners revolting against the colonial authorities in 1854. There is no evidence of who exactly designed the flag but Ross took the design to three women - Anastasia Withers, Anne Duke and Anastasia Hayes, to ask them to sew it and have it ready in time for the meeting taking place at Bakery Hill at 2.00pm on Wednesday the 29 November 1854.

On 30 November 1854, Ross unfurled the flag At Bakery Hill and led the march from Bakery Hill to Eureka Stockade; behind him followed about 1,000 diggers, some armed with rifles, many only armed with picks and shovels. Ross, initially referred to as lieutenant but later as captain, was given the command of a division of the rebel miners by a meeting of the seven captains of the rebellion who met at Eureka that afternoon to organise the defence of Eureka. Later that afternoon, Ross raised the flag on the temporary flagpole that had been erected at Bakery Hill. Sword in hand, his division gathered at the foot of the flagstaff. Peter Lalor jumped onto a stump and asked those around him to take an oath to the Southern Cross. He pointed his right hand towards the Southern Cross and delivered the diggers oath:

We swear by the Southern Cross to stand truly by each other and fight to defend our rights and liberties

The miners shouted 'Amen' and then marched back to the Eureka Stockade and hoisted the flag on a makeshift flagpole at the centre of their camp.

When the first shots rang out at daybreak on Sunday the 3 December 1854, Henry Ross took up his position at the foot of the flagpole. He was mortally wounded during the early phase of the battle and lay dying at the foot of the Southern Cross when trooper King scaled the flagpole and tore the flag down. By some accounts Ross was shot 10 or 15 minutes after he surrendered. Fellow Canadian, Doudiet who painted earlier Eureka events, recorded that he was among those who carried the stockade leader to the nearby Star Hotel and remained with him until he died "in great pain" at 2 am on 5 December 1854. Duncan Clark, from the same miner's regiment as Ross, had been out scouting and returned in time to assist Ross to the hotel.

Some 260 mourners followed the funeral procession of Ross to the Ballarat Cemetery. He was eulogised as "one of the best loved men of those who fell". Ross' father and grandfather had both been soldiers and his mother was apparently ashamed of his part in the rebellion and only ever mentioned that he "just died". Ross was buried at the bottom of a mass grave at the Ballarat Old Cemetery, while his flag of the Southern Cross is owned by the Art Gallery of Ballarat (which stands on the site of the soldiers encampment) and is displayed at the Museum of Australian Democracy at Eureka, the site of the rebellion.

He was a character in the 1949 film Eureka Stockade.
