= Bakery Hill =

- Suburb
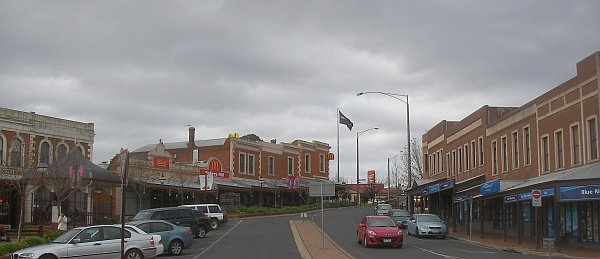
- Little Bridge Street looking north east toward Bakery Hill Junction.

- Interactive map of Bakery Hill
- Coordinates: 37.563°S 143.866°E
- Country: Australia
- State: Victoria
- City: Ballarat
- LGA: City of Ballarat
- Location: 0.5 km (0.31 mi) from Ballarat Central

Government
  - State electorates: Buninyong; Wendouree
  - Federal division: Ballarat

Area
  - Total: 0.25 km^{2} (0.097 sq mi)

Population
  - Total: 180 (2021 census)
  - Density: 720/km^{2} (1,860/sq mi)
- Postcode: 3350
Suburbs around Bakery Hill
Ballarat East	Ballarat East	Ballarat East
Ballarat Central	Bakery Hill	Ballarat East
Golden Point	Golden Point	Ballarat East

Bakery Hill is an inner city suburb of Ballarat in Victoria, Australia. It is the smallest suburb in the city of Ballarat in terms of both area and population, which at the 2021 census was just 180 people. The area is a mix of residential and commercial, as it has been since it came into existence at the beginning of the gold rush. In the present time it is mainly known for its restaurants and pubs, as well as fast food.

Bakery Hill is one of the most historic places in Ballarat and is culturally important to the city. At what is now 29 St. Paul's Way, several large public meetings were held before and after the Eureka Rebellion. It was also one of the richest mining leads in Australia and was the site where the Welcome Nugget was discovered on 9 June 1858.

== Topography ==
The suburb is located on a hill named for the bakery that existed on the site from the 1850s. The boundary of Bakery Hill is Peel Street to the west; Mair Street to the north; East Street to the east and Steinfield Street to the south. It was officially gazetted from Ballarat in 1992.

== History ==
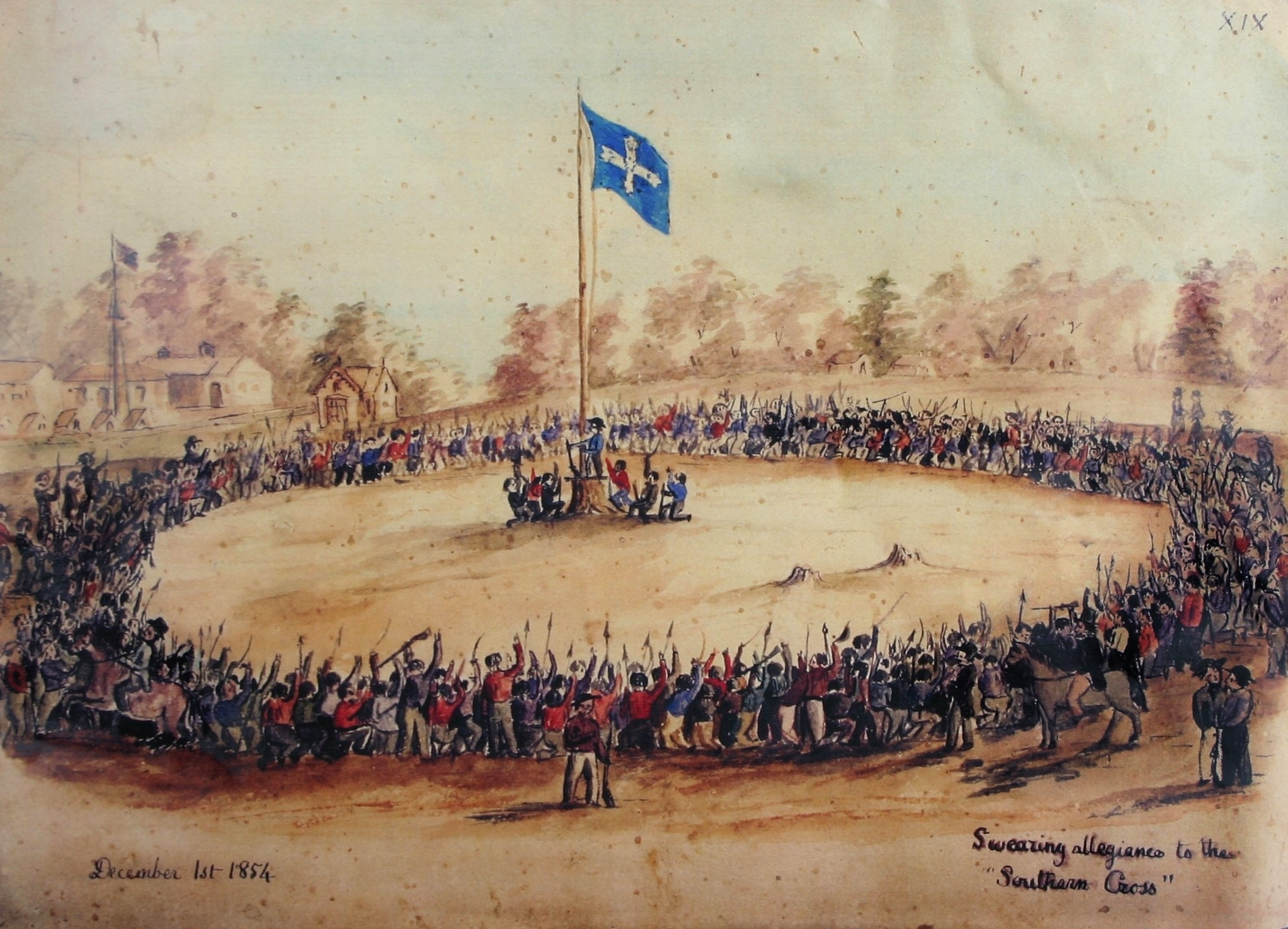
Swearing Allegiance to the Southern Cross on 1 December 1854 on Bakery Hill — watercolour by Charles Doudiet

Bakery Hill dates back to the foundation of Ballarat and the town of East Ballarat. East Ballarat developed organically around the site of gold mines. According to a report commissioned by the City of Ballarat in 2015, given documentary evidence and its elevation, it is the most likely location where miners swore on 1 December 1854 'by the Southern Cross to stand truly by each other and fight to defend our rights and liberties’. Today, a flag pole flies the Eureka Flag to welcome those who arrive at the city from the East.

The area was of prime importance to commerce and the early inhabitants of Ballarat because it was the location where Victoria Street (the road to Melbourne) met Main Road (the road to Geelong).

Bridge Mall and Street are named after the first bridge to cross the Yarrowee River, which existed until the river was directed underground. The street's width reflects the width of the original bridge. The street is six feet higher than it was in the 1850s and 1860s after it was built up to avoid flooding, which had become frequent due to extensive mining on the Black Hill Flats.

== Heritage ==
For a hundred years the site of the Eureka Rebellion meetings had a school positioned on it, Ballarat East State School No.1919 (St. Paul's) from 1877, which was demolished in the 1960s and turned into a carpark.

There are a number of heritage buildings which date back to the 1850s. The area is known for its architecture, including an old three-storey pub located at 3 Peel Street, formerly North Grand Hotel, and a series of semi-detached shops at 26 Bridge Mall. The hotel was famous for the murder of a barmaid, Winifred Brooks, on 29 December 1932 for which Patrick Sheedy was convicted and executed. St Paul's Anglican Church, built in 1865, is significant for its architecture because of a series of changes made to the building to cope with mining activity. It was built on top of an earlier church which had collapsed because of mining activity.

The old school located at the corner of Humffray Street and Mair Street was built in 1876. It operated as a primary school, Humffray Street State School (No. 34), until the 1990s during the Kennett Government's rationalisation of the education system. The school for many years was an antiques centre, but is currently being renovated into a boutique hotel. At the turn of the twentieth century, the school was known for its exceptional scholarship and successful students.

== Notable people ==
- Robert Menzies, 12th Prime Minister of Australia - Attended Humffray Street State School 1906–1907.

== See also ==
- Electoral district of Ballarat East
- Ballarat
