= Currier House (Davenport, Iowa) =

Historic house in Iowa, United States

- U.S. National Register of Historic Places
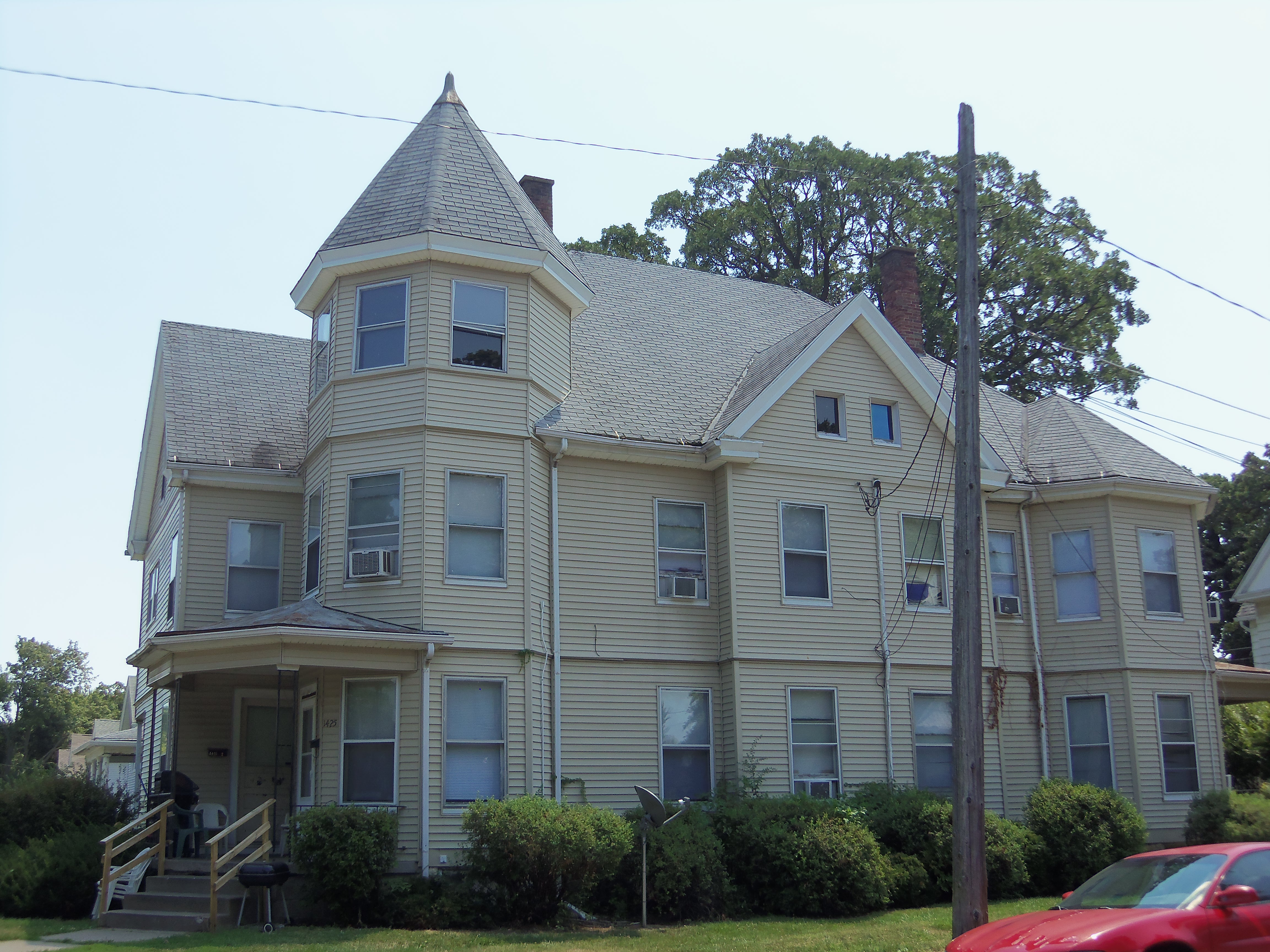

- Location within Iowa Location within the United States
- Location: 1421 Grand Ave. Davenport, Iowa
- Coordinates: 41°32′1″N 90°33′51″W
- Area: less than one acre
- Built: c. 1900-1901
- Architectural style: Queen Anne
- MPS: Davenport MRA
- NRHP reference No.: 83002417
- Added to NRHP: July 7, 1983

The Currier House is a historic building located on the eastside of Davenport, Iowa, United States. At the very beginning of the 20th century, Frederick W. Currier may have had this house built and lived here for a short time when he worked for the Pittsburgh Plate Glass Company. It was later occupied by George M. Watts, who was the manager for the Standard Oil Company. This large, three-story house follows a rambling plan, typical of the Queen Anne style in which it was constructed. It features a corner tower with a conical roof, a full height polygonal bay and gabled pavilions with short cornice returns. The residence was listed on the National Register of Historic Places in 1983.
