= Clare Courier =

Irish newspaper

- Type: Biweekly newspaper
- Format: Tabloid
- Founded: 17 May 1991
- Ceased publication: 2017
- Language: English
- Headquarters: Shannon Business Centre, Shannon, County Clare
- City: Shannon
- Country: Ireland

The Clare Courier was a bi-weekly newspaper based in Ballycasey, Shannon, County Clare, Ireland. It was published every second Thursday. It attracted readers mainly in southeast County Clare and the urban Shannon town area.

Eugene McCafferty served as Editor of the freesheet.
