= Sandusky Courier =

1904-05 car model

The Courier was a brass era car manufactured by Sandusky Automobile Company in Sandusky, Ohio in 1904 and 1905.

The 1904 Courier was a runabout model. It could seat 2 passengers and sold for US$650, making it one of the lowest-priced cars on the market at the time. The flat-mounted single-cylinder engine, situated at the center of the car, produced 7 horsepower (5.2 kW). A 2-speed sliding transmission was fitted. The angle iron-framed car weighed 1,000 pounds (450 kg) and used Concord springs.
