= Currier (surname) =

Currier is a surname. Notable people with the surname include:

- Althea Currier (born 1942), popular glamour model
- Andy Currier, English rugby league footballer of the 1980s and 1990s
- Bill Currier (born 1955), former American football defensive back
- Bill Currier (baseball), American college baseball coach
- Bob Currier (born 1949), retired Canadian professional ice hockey player
- Charles Warren Currier (1857–1918), first Bishop of the Roman Catholic Diocese of Matanzas
- Chester Currier (1946–2007), newspaper and magazine columnist
- David Currier (born 1952), American alpine skier
- Frank Currier (1857–1928), American actor and director
- Frank Dunklee Currier (1853–1921), U.S. Representative from New Hampshire
- Guy W. Currier (1867–1930), lawyer and politician in Massachusetts
- James Currier (20th century), English footballer
- John Currier (1951–2020), United States Coast Guard admiral
- Joseph Frank Currier (1843–1909), American painter
- Joseph Merrill Currier (1820–1884), Canadian member of parliament and businessman
- Lyman Currier (born 1994), American freestyle skier
- Moody Currier (1806–1898), lawyer and banker
- Nathan Currier (born 1960), American composer
- Nathaniel Currier (1813–1888), American lithographer
- Richard C. Currier (1892–1984), American film editor
- Ruth Currier (1926–2011), American dancer and choreographer
- Sebastian Currier (born 1959), American composer
