= Courier Mail =

Courier Mail may refer to:

- The Courier-Mail, an Australian newspaper
- Courier Mail Server, a mail-server software suite
- Courier (email client), email client software
- Courier, an accelerated mail delivery service for which the customer pays a surcharge and receives faster delivery
