= Courier (Israeli newspaper) =

Russian-language daily newspaper published in Israel

The Courier is an Israeli Russian-language Internet newspaper.

The paper was founded in 1991 by Israel Libo Feigin. It is published in Tel Aviv and has had an internet edition since 1998.

== See also ==
- Russians in Israel
- Newspapers in Israel
