= Courier (ship) =

Several ships have been named Courier:

== Civilian vessels ==
- Courier (1781 ship), a brig of 160 or 167 tons (bm), was launched in Boston in 1781. She first appeared in Lloyd's Register (LR) in 1786 as a West Indiaman, sailing out of Greenock. From 1793, she was a Guineaman. She made two voyages as a slave ship in the triangular trade in enslaved people. French vessels captured her on both voyages. The first capture followed a notable single ship action, with her captor ransoming Courier. The second capture, in 1794, resulted in Courier remaining in French hands.
- Courier, a hired armed cutter in service for the benefit of the Royal Navy between 1798 and 1805.
- Courier (1812 ship) was a letter of marque schooner built at Baltimore in 1812. The British captured her in 1813 and she became a British merchantman based in Jersey. She was wrecked in February 1819.
- Courier (1824 ship), a brig of 340 tons (bm), was built by Barry Le Patourel, of Guernsey. She was wrecked on 4 July 1833, on Babel Island, Van Diemen's Land. Her crew were rescued. She was on a voyage from New South Wales to Van Diemen's Land. (Note: A key source on vessels registered in Guernsey has no record of Barry La Patourel, of Guernsey, having built a vessel named Courier. Nor was there any other vessel built in 1824 of 340 tons (bm).)

== HMS Courier ==
- HMS Courier (1776), ex-Le Coureur, a cutter captured by the Royal Navy from the French
- HMS Monkey (1827), ex-Courier, a converted British schooner
- HMS Courier (1830), later renamed Hermes and Charger, a sloop of the Royal Navy between 1830 and 1854
- HMS Courier (1943), formally HMCS Arnprior, a minesweeper of the Royal Navy that served during the Second World War.

== Other ships ==
- USNS Courier (T-AK-5019), a cargo ship launched in 1962 and scrapped in 2008
- USCGC Courier, a US Coast Guard vessel between 1952 and 1972
