= The Daily Courier =

The Daily Courier or Daily Courier is the common name for a number of newspapers, including:

- Grants Pass Daily Courier
- The Daily Courier (Arizona)
- The Daily Courier (Kelowna) in British Columbia
- The Daily Courier (North Carolina)
- Daily Courier, of Connellsville, Pennsylvania, an edition of the Pittsburgh Tribune-Review
