= Capital City Courier =

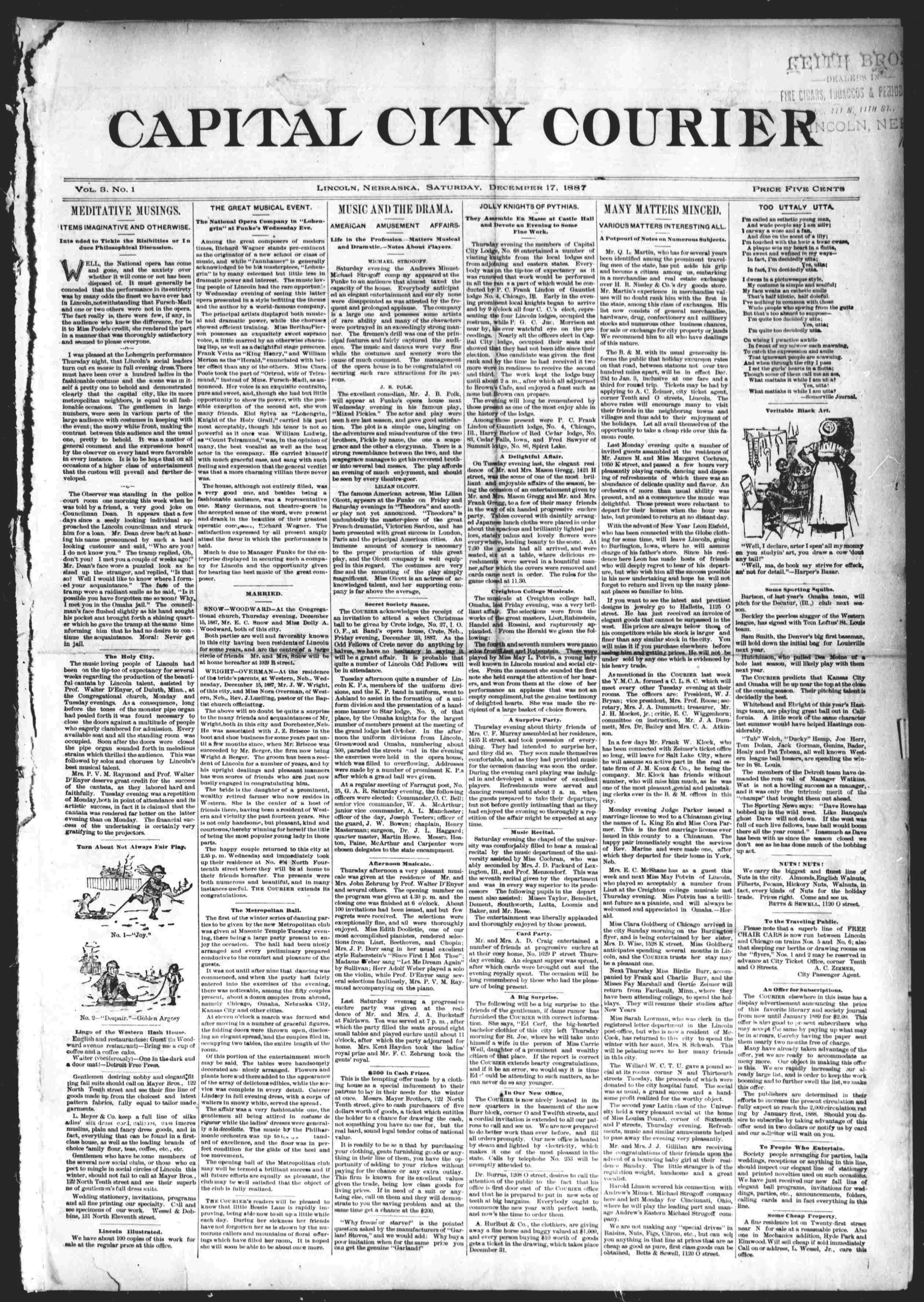
Front page of the December 17, 1887 issue of the Capital City Courier

The Capital City Courier was a newspaper established on December 9, 1885, by L. Wessel in Lincoln, Nebraska, to support local establishments. It was known in its early years as a society builder paper with sections of the paper devoted to literature, music, home architecture, religion, humor, drama, sports, and correspondences or current events.

== History ==
The paper began as a community builder and was first published by Wessel & Dobbins. Later, as the publication grew it took on a clear political stance and tone, the paper was published by the Courier Publication Company. The articles published after 1892, push a Republican platform.

In 1895, Sarah B. Harris and the Nebraska author, Willa Cather were added to the editorial staff of the Courier. Although Cather would leave the paper as an editor in 1898, she would continue to send pieces for publishing during her life.

In 1896, Harris was promoted to managing editor of the newspaper. This allowed for a feminine voice to prominently take part in Nebraska's newspaper revolution. With the change in editors, the Capital City Courier became a social platform and identified itself as an "official organ of the Nebraska State Federation of Women's Clubs". Although Harris re-centered the paper in its community roots, the content of the paper was not regulated to social gossip, and news was always the paper's main focus. The Courier would run until April 4, 1903, when the last issue of the newspaper was published.

=== Changing the Courier's Name ===
During its eighteen years of publication, the Capital City Courier went through multiple name changes:

- Capital City Courier (1885- June 11, 1893)
- Sunday Morning Courier (June 18, 1893 - July 2, 1893)
- Saturday Morning Courier (July 8, 1893 - March 10, 1894)
- Courier (March 17, 1894 - April 4, 1903)
