= The Courier (Narrabri) =

Australian tabloid newspaper

The Courier is a tabloid newspaper published in Narrabri, New South Wales, Australia, since 1873. The Courier has also been published as The North Western Courier, The Narrabri Herald and Northern Districts' Advertiser and The Narrabri Age and Namoi District Newspaper.

== History ==
The Narrabri Herald and Northern Districts' Advertiser was first published in 1873 and The Narrabri Age and Namoi District Newspaper was first published in 1894. Both of these newspapers ceased publication on 23 December 1912 and were incorporated into The North Western Courier which was first published on 7 January 1913. In its first issue The North Western Courier claimed it would support liberal politics.

The North Western Courier shortened its name to The Courier in 1967 but changed the name back to The North Western Courier in 1976. The name was shortened again to The Courier in 1982 and it is still published under that name.

== Digitisation ==
The paper has been digitised as part of the Australian Newspapers Digitisation Program project of the National Library of Australia.

== See also ==
- List of newspapers in Australia
- List of newspapers in New South Wales
