= Eureka Stockade (disambiguation) =

The Eureka Rebellion was a series of events on the Victorian goldfields from 1851 to 1854. It culminated in the Battle of the Eureka Stockade fought between miners and the colonial forces of Australia at Ballarat on 3 December 1854.

Eureka Stockade may also refer to:

== Places and structures ==
- Eureka Stockade (fortification), a crude battlement erected in Ballarat during the Eureka Rebellion
- Eureka Stockade Memorial Park, a reserve encompassing the presumed site of the Eureka Stockade

== Films ==
- Eureka Stockade (1907 film), a 1907 Australian silent film
- Eureka Stockade (1949 film), a 1949 British film
- Eureka Stockade (miniseries), a 1984 Australian miniseries

== Other ==
- Eureka (musical), a 2004 musical staged in Melbourne
- The Eureka Stockade (novel), an 1855 novel by Raffaello Carbon, the first and only comprehensive eyewitness account of the Eureka Rebellion

== See also ==
- Eureka Rebellion in popular culture
