= Eureka Rebellion in popular culture =

The Eureka Rebellion, an 1854 gold miner's revolt in Victoria, Australia, has been the inspiration for numerous novels, poems, films, songs, plays and artworks. Much of Eureka folklore relies heavily on Raffaello Carboni's 1855 book, The Eureka Stockade, which is the first and only comprehensive eyewitness account of the uprising. The poet Henry Lawson wrote about Eureka, as have many novelists.

More recently, there have been four motion pictures based on the Eureka Rebellion. The first was Eureka Stockade, which was a silent film made in 1907, being only the second feature film produced in Australia. There have also been a number of plays and songs about the rebellion. The folk song German Teddy concerns Edward Thonen, one of the rebels who died defending the Eureka Stockade. It has been argued "There has never been one single broadly popular dramatisation of the Eureka Stockade story."

== Carboni's narrative ==
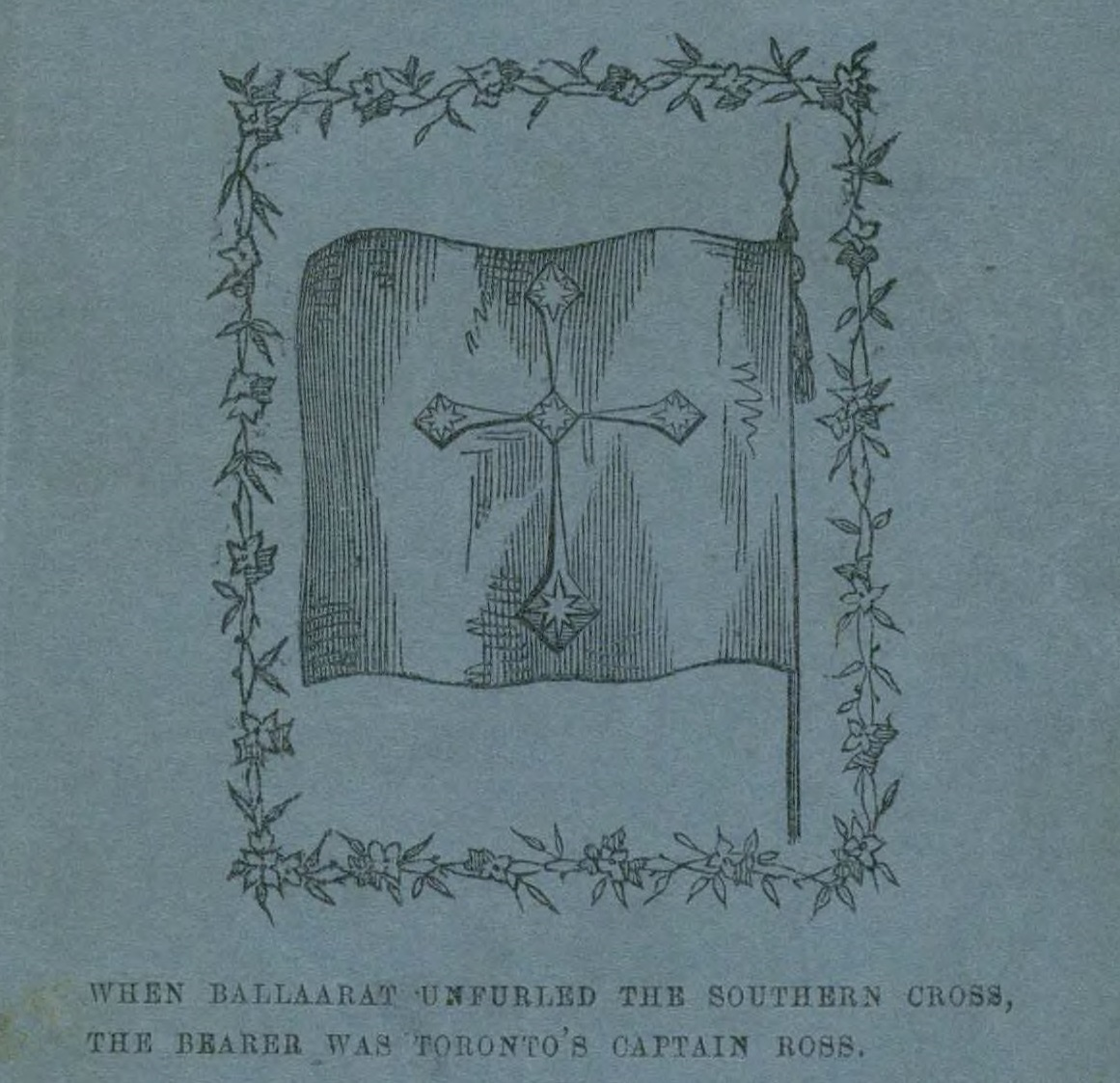
Illustration of the Eureka flag from the front cover of Raffaello Carboni's 1855 "The Eureka Stockade" featuring diamond-shaped stars.

Raffaello Carboni's 1855 book The Eureka Stockade is the only comprehensive eyewitness account of the Eureka Rebellion. He was born on 15 December 1817 in Urbino, Italy and educated at the College of Nobles. Carboni then attended the University of Urbino, where he read logic, ethics, metaphysics, algebra, and geometry. He had only partially completed his studies when he went to Rome and spoke out against Pope Gregory XVI. Carboni was briefly imprisoned as suspected of aiding French Republicans. Two years after Pope Pius IX was elected, Europe had a great upheaval amid the revolutions of 1848. The pontiff was unsympathetic towards the young radical. Carboni was commissioned as a colonel in the army of Giuseppe Garibaldi. He was wounded three times, with the injury he sustained to his leg hampering him for the rest of his life. He went into exile in 1849, living in Frankfurt, Berlin and Dresden before relocating to London, a haven for Italian exiles. Carboni was still there when he heard the news of the Victorian gold rush in late 1852, whereupon he set sail to Australia to seek his fortune. He had some success in Ballarat, being able to keep his head above water and make his licence fee renewal. However, like many others, Carboni did grow weary of the enforcement regime. Peter Lalor relied on Carboni, who could speak multiple languages, to help deal with the European rebels who came from outside Britain and Ireland.

Carboni was one of the thirteen rebel prisoners put on trial for high treason, being acquitted by the Victorian Supreme Court on 21 March 1855. He was elected to the local court in Ballarat as one of nine miners that heard mining disputes. After becoming a British subject, Carboni would leave Australia on 18 January 1856, setting sail as the lone passenger aboard the French vessel Impératrice Eugénie. He used some of the gold he found during his time in Ballarat to fund his travels around the world. Carboni later became a military interpreter and also for Francesco Crispi, an Italian statesman who was negotiating with the British in an attempt to secure their support for the reunification of Italy. He published several books as well as plays and an opera. On 24 October 1875, Carboni died at the St James Hospital in Rome at the age of 57.

One notable inconsistency in Carboni's account is that he describes the Eureka Flag as made of silk, and the cover of the first edition has an illustration that features diamond-shaped stars. These incorrect descriptions plagued early Eureka investigators such as Len Fox, with the fragments held by the Art Gallery of Ballarat being of cotton and mohair construction. However, the blue ground is said to have "a high sheen that gives a silk-like appearance." Eureka: From the Official Records has the three-man peace delegation meeting with Rede on 1 December 1854. Author Ian MacFarlane notes that Carboni, who accompanied George Black and Father Smyth on this occasion, "suggested in his The Eureka Stockade that this meeting took place on 30 November."

== Artworks ==
There are two known drawings of the battle dating from 1854. Charles Doudiet was an associate of Henry Ross and aided the wounded rebel, noting his death at the Free Trade Hotel two days later in his sketchbook. He was present at the burning of Bentley's Hotel, the oath swearing ceremony on Bakery Hill and may have been an eyewitness to the early morning battle. Doudiet depicted these scenes from the Eureka Rebellion, among others from the travels in Australia and time in Ballarat. His sketchbook, now under preservation at the Art Gallery of Ballarat, includes Eureka Slaughter, which has the stockade as a ring of defences.

J.B Henderson's 1854 Eureka Stockade Riot was drawn by an eyewitness to the aftermath. It features the clash between the forlorn hope and the rebel garrison at the perimeter of the stockade.

Also in the collection of the Art Gallery of Ballarat is Eureka Stockade by Samuel Huyghue, completed in 1882. Huyghue was an eyewitness to the Eureka Rebellion and was employed as a government clerk.

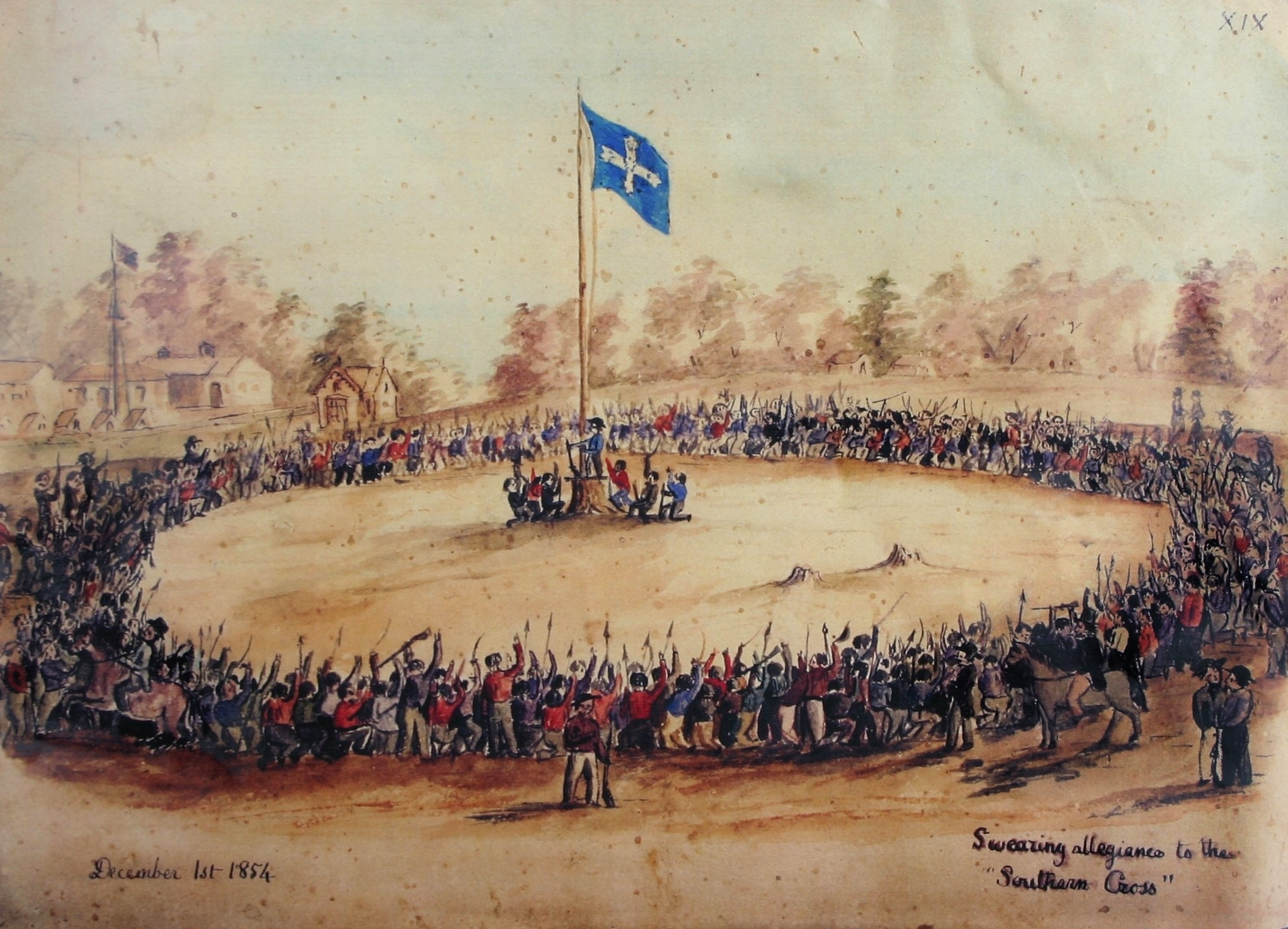
Swearing Allegiance to the Southern Cross by Charles Doudiet (1854)

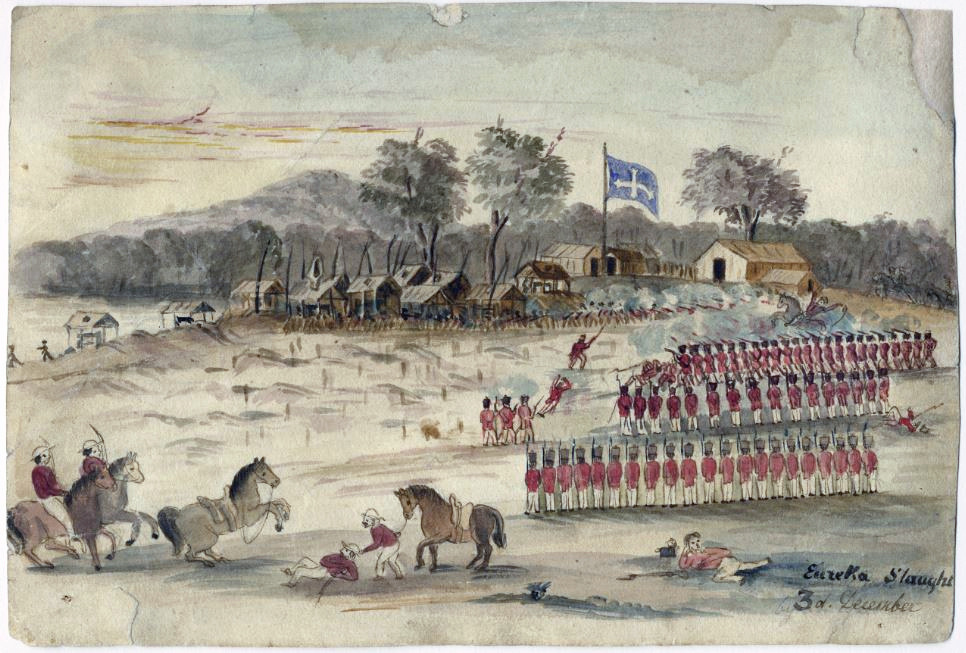
Eureka Slaughter by Charles Doudiet (1854)

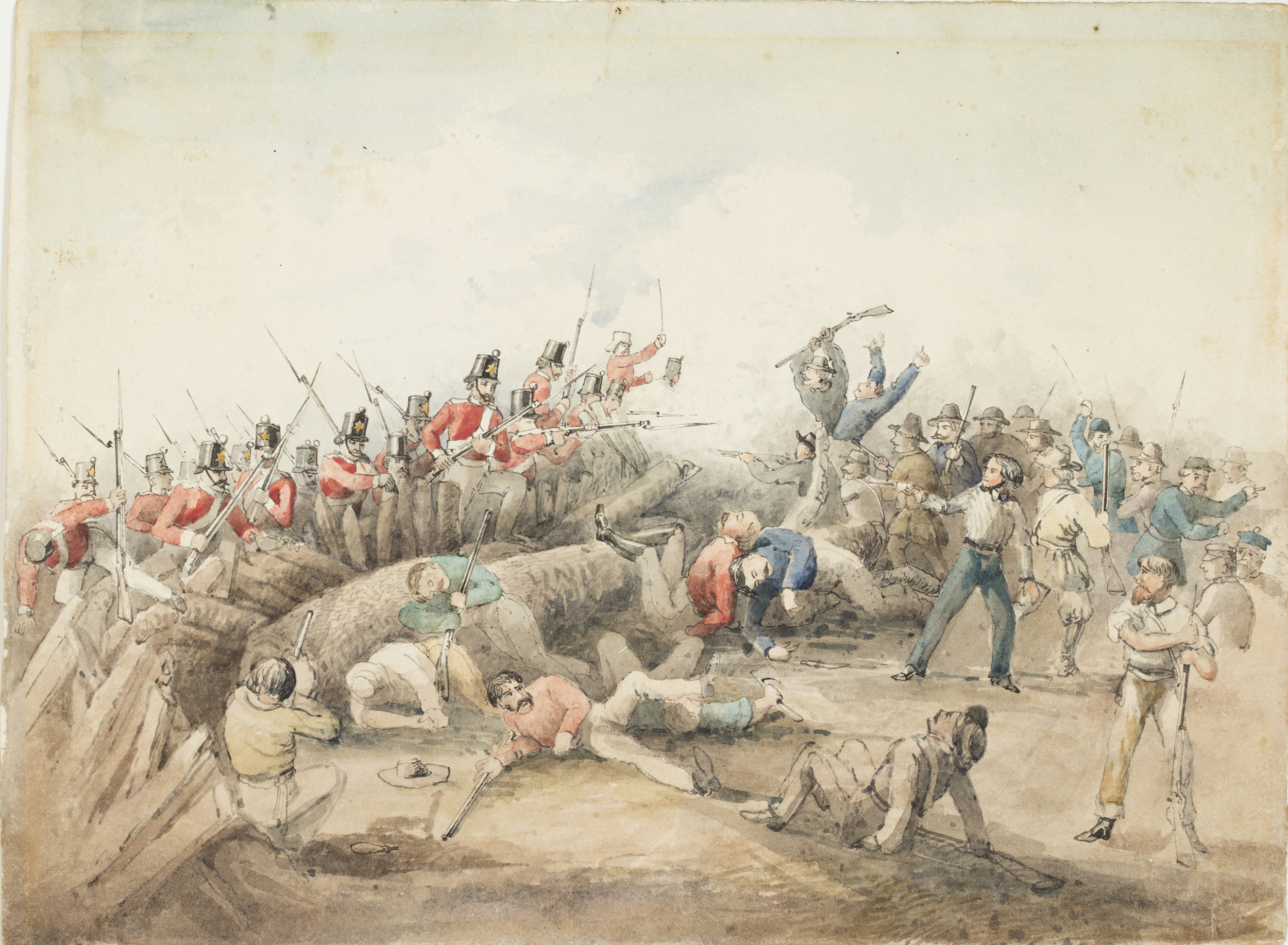
Eureka Stockade Riot by J.B. Henderson (1854)

== Poetry ==
The Eureka Stockade is referenced in several poems by Henry Lawson, including "Flag of the Southern Cross" (1887), "Eureka (A Fragment)" (1889), "The Fight at Eureka Stockade" (1890), and "Freedom on the Wallaby" (1891).

== Novels ==
There have been a number of novels published that were inspired by the Eureka Rebellion. The events were referenced in a work of fiction for the first time in Marcus Clarke's His Natural Life, which relies heavily on the history of Carboni and W.B. Withers. It was serialised in the Australian Journal in 1870-1872 and mentioned Bentley's Hotel with Raffaello Carboni and Peter Lalor being given resembling names. The next Eureka novel was to appear in 1901, entitled Roll-Up: A Tale of the Eureka Riots, by James Middleton. Other novels set in the period to follow include: In the Roaring Fifties (1906), The Call of the Cross (1915), Black Swans (1925), In Days of Gold (1926), Red Mask (1927), An Affair at Eureka (1930), The Fortunes of Richard Mahony (1930), Human Drift (1935), Rebels on the Goldfields (1936), The Five Bright Stars (1954), Ballarat (1962), Road to Ballarat (1958), Southern Cross (1965), and Goldfields (2000).

== Film and television ==
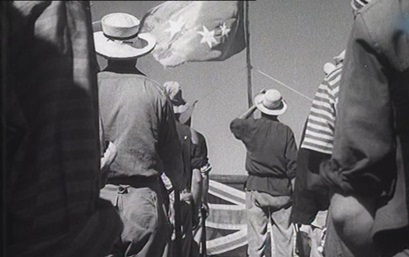
Oath swearing scene from the 1949 motion picture Eureka Stockade

To date, there have been four motion pictures made on the subject of the Eureka Rebellion. None have been financially successful. The first, Eureka Stockade, was a silent 1907 film directed by Arthur and George Cornwell and produced by the Australasian Cinematograph Company. It was the only second feature film made in Australia (the first being the 1906 production, The Story of the Kelly Gang). However, not all the footage has survived, so the duration of the film is unknown. It was described by The Age as "one of the best shown ... highly educational." The film was first screened on 19 October 1907 at the Melbourne Athenaeum. The film impressed critics of the time and was found to be a stirring portrayal of the events surrounding the Eureka Stockade, but it failed to connect with audiences during the two weeks it was screened. The surviving seven-minute fragment (stored at the National Film and Sound Archive) shows street scenes of Ballarat. Other scenes in the lost reels of the film were believed to have included gold seekers leaving London, issuing of licences, licence hunting, diggers chained to logs and rescued by mates, diggers burning Bentley's Hotel, the rebellion, building the stockade, troops storming the stockade and the stockade in ruins.

The Loyal Rebel, also known as Eureka Stockade, is an Australian silent film made in 1915. Directed by Alfred Rolfe, it starred Maisie Carte, Wynn Davies, Reynolds Denniston, Charles Villiers, Percy Walshe, Jena Williams, and Leslie Victor as Peter Lalor. It is a largely fictional account that portrays Peter Lalor as the main character. It is considered a lost film.

A 1949 British film titled Eureka Stockade (released in the United States as Massacre Hill), was shot in Australia. The film starred Chips Rafferty as Peter Lalor and Peter Illing as Raffaello Carboni. It was directed by Harry Watt, produced by Leslie Norman and written by Walter Greenwood, Ralph Smart and Harry Watt. The production was filmed around Singleton, with the Australian army contributing horses and personnel as extras for the combat sequence. The budget was 125,000 pounds, and a set comprising a whole 1850s mining settlement was constructed. In 1950 it was released in the United States under the title Massacre Hill. It is notable for featuring the vintage "star-spangled" Eureka Flag with free-floating stars as per the fly-half of the official Australian national flag and no cross. (Note: It appears from all reports that Harry Watt, producer of the 1949 feature film Eureka Stockade, had gone as far as engaging experts to examine the Eureka Flag fragments held by the Ballarat Fine Art Gallery, amid allegations that they were not from the original specimen. It was said that the apparent bullet holes were caused by moths. Others said the ecclesiastical cross was a later adaptation and that the pieces donated by John King's widow were made for a footballer's picnic.)

Stockade, a 1971 Australian musical film featuring Rod Mullinar as Peter Lalor, was directed by Hans Pomeranz and Ross McGregor. The film was written by Kenneth Cook, and adapted from his musical play. It was the first Australian film to receive government subsidies, and premiered at the Art Gallery of Ballarat.

There has also been a mini-series, Eureka Stockade, written by Richard Butler, which aired on channel seven in 1984. Tony Harrison rated the show by saying, "this can be considered to be Australia's first B-grade mini series."

Riot or Revolution: Eureka Stockade 1854, an Australian documentary from 2006, directed by Don Parham. The film focuses mainly on Governor Hotham (played by Brian Lipson), Raffaello Carboni (Barry Kay), and Douglas Huyghue (Tim Robertson). The accounts of these eyewitnesses are the main source for the monologues directly aimed at the audience, and, as the caption at the start of the film says: "the lines spoken by actors in this film are the documented words of the historical characters." The cast also included Julia Zemiro as Celeste de Chabrillan and Andrew Larkins as Peter Lalor. It was filmed in Ballarat and Toorac House in Melbourne.

== Stage ==
Eureka has also been recalled by playwrights, with the first such production Eureka Stockade, by Edward Duggan, staged in 1891 under the name The Democrat. Others to follow include The Eureka Rebellion (1907), Lalor of Eureka (1939), The Southern Cross (1946), Blood on the Wattle (1948), The Palmers: an Australian Saga (1973), Stockade (1975), and Carboni (1980). Eureka Stockade, a three-act opera with music by Roberto Hazon and a libretto by John Picton-Warlow and Carlo Stransky, was completed in 1988. Eureka! The Musical! was staged in November and December 2004 at Ballarat and Melbourne for the Melbourne International Arts Festival. With music by Michael Maurice Harvey and original work and lyrics by Maggie May Gordon, Eureka was nominated for the Helpmann Award for Best Musical in 2005. Like the 1973 play, there was artistic licence aplenty at work in the casting of a fictional Chinese Eureka man. Australian academic and journalist Germaine Greer panned the production in an interview aired on the ABC's Critical Mass, saying: "It's one cliche after another, it's repulsively politically correct ... We doff our caps to everyone we think we should doff our caps to. We even try to get the poor Chinese involved in the Eureka Stockade."

== Music ==
Recording of the 1889 song German Teddy

The Australian folk song German Teddy is about Edward Thonen, one of the miners killed at the Stockade. The song, probably based on Carboni's account, is from a single 1889 manuscript. It formed the basis for the symphony German Teddy by Australian composer George Dreyfus, which premiered in 1986. In 2016, the symphony was performed at the Museum of Australian Democracy at Eureka.
