= John Joseph (rebel) =

American gold miner and leader of the 1854 Eureka Rebellion at Ballarat, Australia

John Joseph or John Josephs was a gold miner who participated in the battle of the Eureka Stockade in 1854. An African American expatriate, little is known about Joseph's background. He arrived in Ballarat several days before the battle, and was in the front lines as the soldiers stormed the Eureka Stockade. The miners were quickly subdued and over a hundred were arrested. 13 were singled out for trial. Joseph was the first to be tried. As a Black person, the prosecution likely believed that he would be easy to convict, but the jury acquitted him after half an hour, as were the other 12.

== Biography ==
Little is known about John Joseph's background. He was described as an African-American man, tall and powerfully built, in his late thirties. Sources variously state that he was from New York City or Boston, where slavery had been abolished, or Baltimore, where freemen co-existed with enslaved people.

According to Santilla Chingaipe, who researched Joseph's life for her documentary Our African Roots (2021), Joseph was probably a sailor who reached Australia by way of Britain. Attracted by the Victorian gold rush, he likely jumped ship and walked to Victoria. When Joseph was on trial, his defense argued that Joseph resided on the Avoca goldfield and that he came to Ballarat only days before the battle of the Eureka Stockade. In Ballarat, he ran an illicit sly-grog shop out of a tent.

The battle of the Eureka Stockade, fought on 3 December 1854, was the culmination of the Eureka Rebellion. It was a short-lived miners' revolt, mainly against what they saw as the colonial authorities' abuse of power and the miner's licence system. It is uncertain what Joseph's motives were for joining the rebels.

Joseph, brandishing a double-barreled shotgun, was in the front lines when the troopers entered the stockade. He fired one shot, and a bullet hit their leader, Captain Henry Christopher Wise, in the leg. Believing Joseph was responsible, multiple soldiers went to attack him. They reported Joseph fired again before dropping the shotgun, picking up a pike, and fleeing to the "guard tent" within the Eureka Stockade. When the tent was stormed, Joseph surrendered to Sub-Inspector Charles Jeffries Carter, who handed him over to the troops of the 40th regiment. Reportedly, he kept struggling and resisting for a while.

=== Trial ===
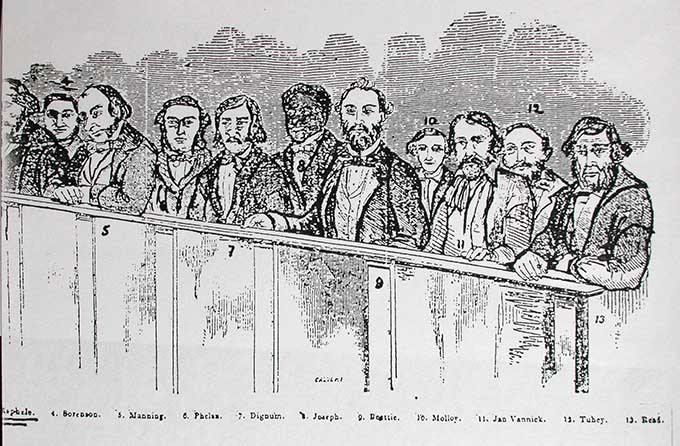
Defendants at the 1855 Victorian high treason trials. Joseph is the defendant marked 8

After the battle, over one hundred miners were arrested. 13, including Joseph, were singled out to be tried for high treason. Joseph was the first to go on trial. The prosecution may have hoped to exploit any racial prejudices among the jurors. (Note: John Joseph, an American Negro, and James Campbell, a Jamaican, were both selected to be among the thirteen rebel prisoners to go on trial. It has been said that they were chosen as a result of the anti-non-white sentiment of the colonial population, with defence barrister Butler Aspinall Cole asking the jury, "Surely, gentlemen of the jury, won’t you hesitate to hang a trifling nigger to oblige the Attorney-General?" However others such as John Molony have said that would have been a doubtful proposition to begin, with that the jury consisting of good citizens would be swayed by racial prejudice alone to convict either man, especially with the widespread support for the rebels by the Victorian people.) Two privates from the 40th regiment testified that they saw the defendant fire a double-barreled shotgun, implying that he was the one who shot Captain Wise. Wise had had his leg amputated, and he died of infection three weeks later. It is not certain that Joseph's bullet was the one that hit him, as shots were being fired in all directions.

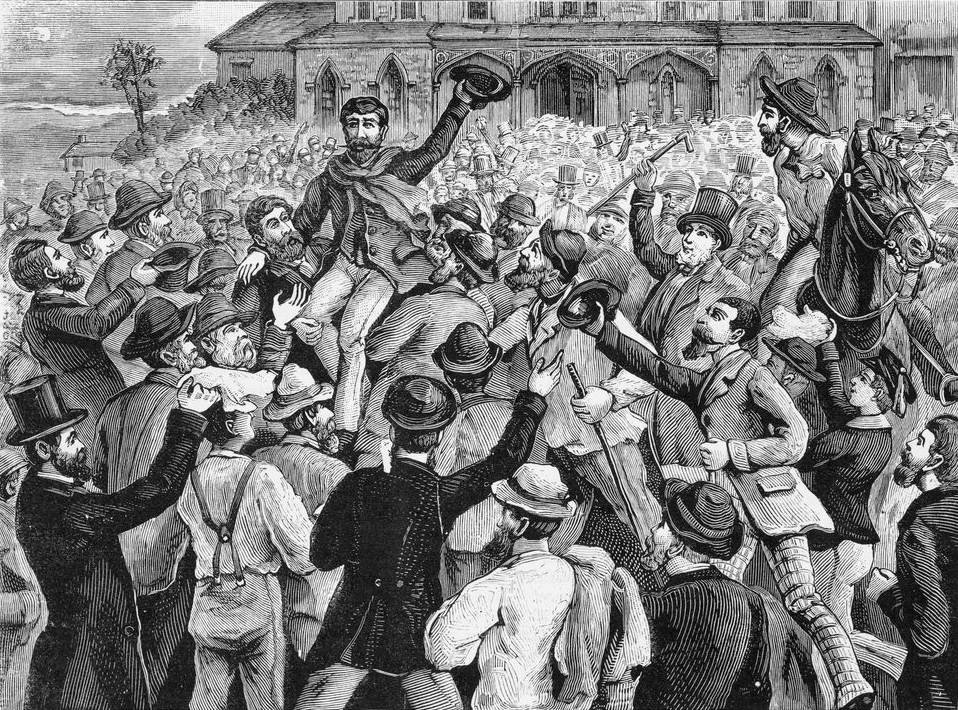
Thousands of Melbourne residents celebrated the acquittal of the rebels, and paraded them through the streets upon their release from the Victorian Supreme Court.

Butler Cole Aspinall, who appeared pro bono as junior counsel for the defendants John Joseph and Raffaello Carboni, was formerly chief of parliamentary reporting for The Argus before returning to practice and was elected to the Legislative Assembly in the wake of the Eureka trials. He would receive many other criminal briefs later in his legal career, including the matter of Henry James O’Farrell, who was indicted for an 1868 assassination attempt on the Duke of Edinburgh in Sydney. Gavan Duffy said of Aspinall that he was: "one of the half-dozen men whose undoubted genius gave the Parliament of Victoria a first place among colonial legislatures."

As John Molony points out, "No question could arise as to the legality of trying a foreigner for treason, as such a matter had been widely agreed upon as early as 1649". However regarding the mens rea requirement:

it was another thing entirely to prove that any treasonable intent was harboured in the mind of John Joseph ... These matters were weighty and more conclusive of proof than a charge of murder, but they left the Crown with an arduous task of convincing the jury that Joseph had acted with such an elevated intent.

The jury deliberated for about half an hour before returning a verdict of "not guilty." The Argus reported that "A sudden burst of applause arose in the court," but it was instantly checked by court officers. The Chief Justice condemned this as an attempt to influence the jury, as it could be construed that a jury could be encouraged to deliver a verdict that would receive such applause; he sentenced two men (identified by the Crown Solicitor as having applauded) to a week in prison for contempt. Over 10,000 people had come to hear the jury's verdict. According to Richard Allan's account published in the Ballarat Star, upon emerging from the courthouse, Joseph "was put in a chair and carried around the streets of the City in triumph with the greatest demonstrations of joy".

== Legacy ==
Little is known about Joseph's life after his acquittal. In 1858, Joseph died in Bendigo from a suspected heart attack. He was buried in an unmarked grave at White Hills Cemetery. Fellow rebel Raffaello Carboni described Joseph as a "kind cheerful heart" with a "sober, plain, matter of fact, contented mind".

Australian artist Sidney Nolan drew a portrait of John Joseph, Native of New York, Eureka Stockade (1949).

In February 2023, Joseph was honoured by the US Ambassador to Australia, Caroline Kennedy, for his contribution to Australian history and exemplifying the US Government's "commitment to racial equity and recognising historical injustice".

== Bibliography ==
- Atkinson, Jeffrey; Roberts, David (2008). "'Men of Colour': John Joseph and the Eureka Treason Trials". Journal of Australian Colonial History. 10 (1): 75–98. ISSN 1441-0370.
- Corfield, Justin; Wickham, Dorothy; Gervasoni, Clare (2004). The Eureka Encyclopedia. Ballarat: Ballarat Heritage Services. ISBN 978-1-87-647861-2.
- Molony, John (1984). Eureka. Ringwood: Viking. ISBN 978-0-67-080085-8.
- Stoljar, Jeremy (2011). The Australian Book of Great Trials: The Cases That Shaped a Nation. Millers Point: Murdoch Books. ISBN 978-1-74-266131-5.
