= 1855 Victorian high treason trials =

Trials of gold miners in Australia

The 1855 Victorian high treason trials took place between 22 February – 27 March in the aftermath of the Battle of the Eureka Stockade. The Goldfields Commission recommended a general amnesty for all on the runs from the fallen Eureka Stockade. Instead, thirteen of the rebels detained were eventually indicted for high treason. The juries all returned a verdict of not guilty by a jury, and the indictment against Thomas Dignum was withdrawn. On 23 January, the trial of Ballarat Times editor Henry Seekamp resulted in a finding of guilt for seditious libel, and a month later, he was sentenced to a term of imprisonment of six months. The trials have been described as farcical, and the colonial secretary would rebuke Governor Sir Charles Hotham over prosecuting the Eureka rebels for the lofty offence of high treason.

== Goldfields Commission recommends general amnesty ==
On 14 December 1854, the Goldfields Commission sat for the first time. The first Ballarat session is held four days later at Bath's Hotel. At a meeting with Hotham on 8 January 1855, the gold fields commissioners made an interim finding that the mining tax be scrapped, and two days later made a submission advising a general amnesty be granted in relation to all those persons criminally liable for their association with the Eureka Rebellion.

== Trial of Henry Seekamp ==
The first trial relating to the rebellion was a charge of sedition against Henry Seekamp of the Ballarat Times. Seekamp was arrested in his newspaper office on 4 December 1854 for a series of articles that appeared in the Ballarat Times. It has been speculated some of the offending articles were written by either John Manning, George Lang, the embezzling bank manager whose father was the prominent Republican and Presbyterian Minister of Sydney, the Reverend John Dunmore Lang, or Clara Seekamp, Henry's de facto wife. Seekamp was tried and convicted of seditious libel by a Melbourne jury on 23 January 1855 and, after a series of appeals, sentenced to six months imprisonment on 23 March. He was released from prison on 28 June 1855, precisely three months early. During Seekamp's absence, Clara would serve as editor of the Ballarat Times.

== Eureka high treason trials ==
=== List of detainees at the Eureka Stockade ===
The approximately 120 detainees were mainly apprehended at or in the vicinity of the Eureka Stockade on the day of the battle. They marched to the Ballarat police holding cells until indictments could be issued or dropped. Most of the detainees faced a committal hearing presided over by a bench of magistrates. Depositions of crown witnesses for the brief of evidence in the high treason trials were taken between 7-9 December 1854 in Ballarat, mostly from soldiers and police officers who took part in the battle and other witnesses. Each deponent made a signed and sworn written statement concerning their knowledge of the facts concerning the indictment. The testimony was given in open court in the presence of the accused person, who was able to respond via submitting a statement of the accused, although this right was often waived by the detainees. Where the death of a person was involved, the proceedings became an inquest. The deponents were bound by recognisances to give evidence or a signed undertaking to appear at the trial for examination in chief at various venues if required.

Nothing is known about the status of most of the detainees regarding their actual participation in the armed uprising.

==== Released without charge ====
Name	Birth year	Birthplace	Legacy and notes	Ref(s)
William Adams	unknown	unknown	Adams lived in the vicinity of the Eureka Stockade and was wounded by gunfire three times whilst trying to get his family to safety. He was taken prisoner and spent a week convalescing at the government camp hospital. Adams would later unsuccessfully claim 937 pounds in damages for loss of property and false imprisonment.	
Michael Noonan	1839	unknown	Noonan lost his store and received 70 pounds in compensation. His spouse was also assaulted at the time of the battle, and he was detained for five days after being arrested while standing near the St Alphius chapel.	

==== High treason committal hearings ====
It was reported during the high treason committal hearings that the following detainees had been discharged for either "no evidence against the prisoners, or they were only proved guilty of living in the neighborhood of the Eureka Stockade, and giving no information as to its erection". A group of thirteen rebel prisoners were eventually committed to stand for trial for high treason at the Supreme Court in Melbourne.

8 December 1854 hearing

Name	Birth year	Birthplace	Court order	Legacy and notes	Ref(s)
Charles Adams	1829?	unknown	discharged	Adams was a storekeeper in Ballarat who was taken prisoner and discharged at the committal hearings. May have been the same Charles Adams who was a miner at the Black lead and died in December 1861 aged 32.	
Nicholas Allaire	unknown	unknown	discharged	Allaire was in Ballarat at the time of the battle and was discharged at the committal hearings.	
Thomas Barry	unknown	unknown	discharged	Barry was in Ballarat at the time of the battle and was discharged at the committal hearings.	
Henry Bazley	unknown	unknown	discharged	Bazley was in Ballarat at the time of the battle and was discharged at the committal hearings.	
Thomas Bisk	unknown	unknown	discharged	Bisk was in Ballarat at the time of the battle and was discharged at the committal hearings.	
Thomas Box	unknown	unknown	discharged	Box was arrested in Ballarat on 3 December 1854 and discharged at the committal hearings.	
Charles Brown	unknown	unknown	discharged	Brown was in Ballarat at the time of the battle and was discharged at the committal hearings.	
Edmund Burns	unknown	unknown	discharged	Burns (or Burn) was arrested inside the Eureka Stockade on 3 December 1854. He later made a compensation claim for his tent, which was set on fire during the battle. Burns was discharged at the committal hearings.	
John Cahill	1833	County Clare, Ireland	discharged	Cahill was arrested at the Eureka Stockade on the day of the battle. He was active on a committee to redress the grievances of the mining community in Ballarat. Cahill was discharged at the committal hearings.	
George Davidson	unknown	unknown	discharged	Davidson was arrested on the day of the battle and discharged at the committal hearings.	
John Delamere	unknown	unknown	discharged	Delamere was arrested on the day of the battle and discharged at the committal hearings.	
Nicholas Edwards	unknown	unknown	discharged	Edwards was arrested on the day of the battle and discharged at the committal hearings.	
Patrick Gilhooly	unknown	unknown	discharged	Gilhooly was arrested on the day of the battle and discharged at the committal hearings.	
Joseph Gray	unknown	unknown	discharged	Gray was arrested on the day of the battle and discharged at the committal hearings.	
Joseph Hindon	unknown	unknown	discharged	Hindon was arrested on the day of the battle and discharged at the committal hearings.	
Isaac Hinds	1797	Cumberland, England	discharged	Hinds was arrested on the day of the battle and discharged at the committal hearings. He was a character witness in Bentley's trial in November 1854.	
Richard Humphreys	unknown	unknown	discharged	Humphreys was arrested on the day of the battle and discharged at the committal hearings.	
Francis Kent	unknown	unknown	discharged	Kent was arrested on the day of the battle and discharged at the committal hearings.	
Martin Kinnear	unknown	unknown	discharged	Kinnear was arrested on the day of the battle and discharged at the committal hearings.	
Robert Leslie	unknown	unknown	discharged	Leslie was arrested on the day of the battle and discharged at the committal hearings.	
Joseph Macknon	unknown	unknown	discharged	Macknon was in Ballarat at the time of the battle and was arrested and discharged at the committal hearings.	
Dugald Magennis	unknown	unknown	discharged	Magennis was arrested on the day of the battle and discharged at the committal hearings.	
J Kennedy O'Brien	unknown	unknown	discharged	O'Brien was arrested on the day of the battle whilst in the vicinity of the Saint Alphius Catholic church. He was discharged at the committal hearings. All of O'Brien's possessions went missing whilst he was in police custody. He made a compensation claim for his time in custody. O'Brien's name appears on the 1855 electoral roll, and he was a signatory to the Benden S Hassell compensation petition.	
Matthew Orr	unknown	unknown	discharged	Orr was arrested on the day of the battle and discharged at the committal hearings.	
Joseph Penrose	unknown	unknown	discharged	Penrose was arrested on the day of the battle whilst in the vicinity of the Saint Alphuis Catholic church. He was discharged at the committal hearings.	
John Powell	unknown	unknown	discharged	Powell was arrested on the day of the battle and discharged at the committal hearings.	
Peter Priaulx	unknown	unknown	discharged	Priaulx was arrested on the day of the battle and discharged at the committal hearings. There are records of a farmer named Peter Priaulx arriving in Melbourne aboard the Saldanha.	
John Quin	unknown	unknown	discharged	Quin was arrested on the day of the battle and discharged at the committal hearings. He was a character witness in Michael Noonan's compensation claim.	
Henry Robilliard	1800	Guernsey	discharged	Robilliard was arrested on the day of the battle and discharged at the committal hearings.	
Alexander Ross	unknown	unknown	discharged	Ross was arrested on the day of the battle and discharged at the committal hearings.	
Martin Ryan	unknown	unknown	discharged	Ryan was arrested on the day of the battle and discharged at the committal hearings. He subsequently made an unsuccessful compensation claim of 8 pounds for the destruction of his tent and property by the colonial forces. Ryan had asserted that he took no part in the armed uprising directly or indirectly.	
Walter Ryley	unknown	unknown	discharged	Ryley was arrested on the day of the battle and discharged at the committal hearings.	
Arthur Smith	unknown	unknown	discharged	Smith was arrested on the day of the battle and discharged at the committal hearings.	
William James Steer	unknown	unknown	discharged	Steer was arrested on the day of the battle and discharged at the committal hearings.	
Thomas Ferdinand Tighe	unknown	unknown	discharged	Tighe was arrested at the time of the battle and was discharged at the committal hearings.	
George Thompson	unknown	unknown	discharged	Thompson was present at the battle. He was arrested and discharged at the committal hearings.	
Henry Trynon	unknown	unknown	discharged	Trynon was arrested at the time of the battle and was discharged at the committal hearings.	
Andrew White	unknown	unknown	discharged	White was arrested at the time of the battle and was discharged at the committal hearings.	
Robert Winkfield	1814	London, England	discharged	Winkfield was arrested at the time of the battle and was discharged at the committal hearings.	

11 December 1854 hearing

Name	Birth year	Birthplace	Court order	Legacy and notes	Ref(s)
Carl Anderson (a Swede)	unknown	Sweden	discharged	Anderson was arrested on 3 December 1854 and discharged during the committal hearings.	
James Ashburner	1827	Liverpool, England	discharged	Ashburner was a pikeman at the Eureka Stockade who was captured during the fall of the Stockade. He was reported for wielding a pike made from a pick. Ashburner witnessed Peter Lalor being shot, and fearing for the rebel leader's life, he dragged Lalor outside the stockade, where he took refuge in a hole. He was detained soon after and chained to Timothy Hayes overnight. Ashburner was in Ballarat for the 50th anniversary commemorations. His account was published in the Ballarat Courier, 3 December 1904 edition.	
William Avondale	unknown	unknown	discharged	Avondale was arrested on the day of the battle and discharged at the committal hearings.	
James Barclay	unknown	unknown	discharged	Barclay was arrested on the day of the battle and discharged at the committal hearings. He may be the same James Barclay who died at age 36 in 1862.	
Edmund Bohen	unknown	unknown	discharged	Bohen was in Ballarat at the time of the battle. He was arrested and discharged at the committal hearings.	
Michael Butler	unknown	unknown	dischared	Butler was arrested on 3 December 1854 and discharged during the committal hearings. He may have been the same Michael Butler who arrived in Melbourne in 1841 with his parents at age four.	
William Develin	unknown	unknown	discharged	Develin was arrested on 3 December 1854 and discharged during the committal hearings.	
Charles Doolan	unknown	unknown	discharged	Doolan was arrested on 3 December 1854 and discharged during the committal hearings.	
William Galloway	unknown	unknown	discharged	Galloway was arrested on 3 December 1854 and discharged during the committal hearings. His tent was next to Thomas Cox's. Galloway had blood on his hands at the time he was arrested. On 11 December 1854, he appeared at the inquest into the death of Henry Powell.	
Michael Gleeson	1823	Gowran, Kilkenny, Ireland	discharged	Gleeson was arrested on 3 December 1854 and discharged during the committal hearings.	
Patrick Hickey	unknown	unknown	discharged	Hickey was arrested on 3 December 1854 and discharged during the committal hearings.	
Jeremiah Hogan	1826	unknown	discharged	Hogan was arrested on 3 December 1854 and discharged during the committal hearings.	
John Kelly	unknown	unknown	discharged	Kelly was arrested on 3 December 1854 and discharged during the committal hearings. The US consul, James Tarleton, made representations to secure his release from custody. Kelly was a partner along with Frank Carey in the Excelsior restaurant and boarding house and had previously served a six-month sentence for selling alcohol without a licence.	
Michael Kennedy	unknown	unknown	discharged	Kennedy was arrested on 3 December 1854 and discharged during the committal hearings. He was a signatory to the Benden S Hassell compensation petition in 1855.	
Patrick Kennedy	unknown	unknown	discharged	Kennedy was a miner who was visiting a friend on 2 December 1854. He was held as a prisoner at the Eureka Stockade, perhaps under suspicion he was a spy, and managed to escape. His friend lived near the stockade, and Kennedy was again detained. Kennedy was discharged at the committal hearings and discovered that his belongings had been stolen from him during his time in custody	
John Leadow	unknown	unknown	discharged	Leadow was arrested on 3 December 1854 and discharged during the committal hearings.	
John Lynch	1826	Ennis, County Clare, Ireland	survivor	One of Peter Lalor's captains, he helped to conceal the rebel leader in a hole with slabs. He was arrested later that day and released. He returned to Ballarat to deliver an oration for the second anniversary of the battle. His memoirs were published in the Austral Light from October 1893 to March 1894. Buried in the Smythesdale Cemetery.	
Daniel Macartney	unknown	unknown	discharged	Macartney was arrested on 3 December 1854 and discharged during the committal hearings.	
Patrick Meade	unknown	unknown	discharged	Meade was arrested on 3 December 1854 and discharged during the committal hearings.	
Michael Meagher	unknown	unknown	discharged	Meagher was arrested on 3 December 1854 and discharged during the committal hearings.	
John Pardy	unknown	unknown	discharged	Pardy was arrested on 3 December 1854 and discharged during the committal hearings.	
Samuel Penny	unknown	unknown	discharged	Penny was arrested on 3 December 1854 and discharged during the committal hearings.	
Cornelius (or Charles) Peters	1827/1828	Heemsted, Netherlands	discharged	Peters was arrested on 3 December 1854 and discharged during the committal hearings. He testified in the high treason trial of Jan Vennick.	
James Sexton	unknown	unknown	discharged	Sexton was arrested on 3 December 1854 and discharged during the committal hearings.	
William Somerville	unknown	unknown	discharged	Somerville was arrested on 3 December 1854 and discharged during the committal hearings.	
William Stafford	unknown	unknown	discharged	Stafford was arrested on 3 December 1854 and discharged during the committal hearings.	
Herman Steinman	unknown	unknown	discharged	Steinman was arrested on 3 December 1854 and discharged during the committal hearings.	
Joseph Walker	unknown	unknown	discharged	Walker was arrested at the time of the battle and was discharged during the committal hearings.	
William Wickley	unknown	unknown	discharged	Wickley was arrested at the time of the battle and was discharged during the committal hearings.	

=== Written summonses issued ===
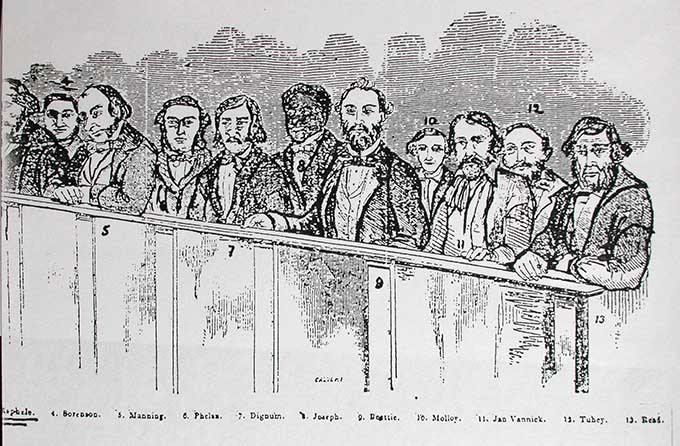
Engraving published in The Age of some of the rebels on trial.

The thirteen rebel prisoners had already been served with written summonses and, after being called by name and seated, were asked in the following manner to answer the following indictments:

Prisoners at the bar, the charge against you in the first count of the information to which you are now called to plead is, that you did, on the 3rd December, 1854 (being at the time armed in a warlike manner), traitorously assemble together against our Lady the Queen; and that you did, whilst so armed and assembled together, levy and make war against our said Lady the Queen, within that part of her dominions called Victoria, and attempt by force of arms to destroy the Government constituted there and by law established, and to depose our Lady the Queen from the kingly name and her Imperial Crown.

In the second count you are charged with having made war, as in the first count mentioned, and with attempting at the same time to compel by force our said Lady the Queen to change her measures and counsels.

In the third count the charge against you is, that having devised and intended to deprive our said Lady the Queen of the kingly name of the Imperial Crown in Victoria, you did express and evince such treasonable intention by the four following overt acts:

Ist That you raised upon a pole, and collected round a certain standard, and did solemnly swear to defend each other, with the intention of levying war against our said Lady the Queen. (Note: The Eureka flag was the main physical evidence entered into the record by the prosecution. Called as a witness, George Webster, the chief assistant civil commissary and magistrate, testified that upon entering the stockade, the besieging forces "immediately made towards the flag, and the police pulled down the flag." John King testified, "I took their flag, the southern cross, down – the same flag as now produced.")

2nd being armed with divers offensive weapons, you collected together and formed troops and bands under distinct leaders, and were drilled and trained in military exercise, to prepare for fighting against the soldiers and other loyal subjects of the Queen.

3rd That you collected and provided arms and ammunition, and erected divers fences and stockades, in order to levy war against our said Lady the Queen.

4th That being armed and arrayed in a warlike manner, you fired upon. fought with, wounded, and killed divers of the said soldiers and other subjects then fighting in behalf of our said Lady the Queen, contrary to duty and allegiance.

In the fourth count the charge against you is, that having devised and . levy war against the Queen, in order to compel her by force and constraint her measures and counsels, you did express and evince such treasonable and divers acts, which overt acts are four in number, and the same as those described in the third count.

The prosecution was unable to proceed with any lesser charges, such as murder due to the difficulties associated with the criminal burden of proof. Commissioner of Crown Lands, Gilbert Amos, testified that "it was perfectly impossible for us to be seen until we came within 500 yards." A sergeant in the 40th regiment, James Harris, said that it was only possible to positively identify certain rebels at a distance of 50 yards at the time of the fighting. Private John Donnelly swore under oath that: "It was scarcely light; it was light enough to see what we were doing" and that the sun was shining by the time the stockade was overrun, stating that: "Ten minutes at the break of day makes a great deal of difference."

=== Preliminary hearings ===
The defendants were originally to be tried in the same order as they were listed in the indictments as follows: Timothy Hayes, Charles Raphelo Carboni, John Manning, John Joseph, Jan Vennick, James Beattie, Henry Reid, Michael Tuohy, James Macfie Campbell, William Molloy, Jacob Sorrenson, Thomas Dignum and John Phelan. However, due to the pre-trial legal chicanery and the unavailability of witnesses, Joseph, an African American, was the first accused man to go on trial. The prosecution may have hoped to exploit any racial prejudices among the jurors. (Note: John Joseph, an American Negro, and James Campbell, a Jamaican, were both selected to be among the thirteen rebel prisoners to go on trial. It has been said that they were chosen as a result of the anti-non-white sentiment of the colonial population, with defence barrister Butler Aspinall Cole asking the jury, "Surely, gentlemen of the jury, won’t you hesitate to hang a trifling nigger to oblige the Attorney-General?" However others such as John Molony have said that would have been a doubtful proposition to begin, with that the jury consisting of good citizens would be swayed by racial prejudice alone to convict either man, especially with the widespread support for the rebels by the Victorian people.) Two privates from the 40th regiment testified that they saw the defendant fire a double-barreled shotgun, and by implication, that he inflicted the fatal wounds to Captain Wise.

=== Trial of John Joseph ===
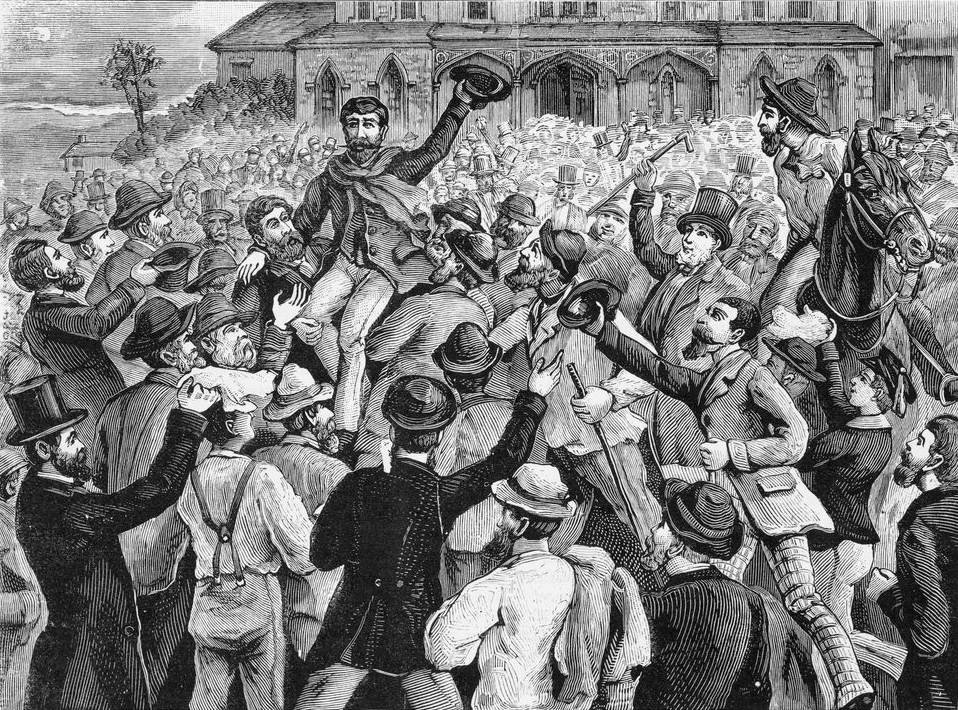
Thousands of Melbourne residents celebrated the acquittal of the rebels, and paraded them through the streets upon their release from the Victorian Supreme Court.

Butler Cole Aspinall, who appeared pro bono as junior counsel for the defendants John Joseph and Raffaello Carboni, was formerly chief of parliamentary reporting for The Argus before returning to practice and was elected to the Legislative Assembly in the wake of the Eureka trials. He would receive many other criminal briefs later in his legal career, including the matter of Henry James O’Farrell, who was indicted for an 1868 assassination attempt on the Duke of Edinburgh in Sydney. Gavan Duffy said of Aspinall that he was: "one of the half-dozen men whose undoubted genius gave the Parliament of Victoria a first place among colonial legislatures."

As John Molony points out, "No question could arise as to the legality of trying a foreigner for treason, as such a matter had been widely agreed upon as early as 1649". However regarding the mens rea requirement:

it was another thing entirely to prove that any treasonable intent was harboured in the mind of John Joseph ... These matters were weighty and more conclusive of proof than a charge of murder, but they left the Crown with an arduous task of convincing the jury that Joseph had acted with such an elevated intent.

The jury deliberated for about half an hour before returning a verdict of "not guilty." The Argus reported that "A sudden burst of applause arose in the court," but it was instantly checked by court officers. The Chief Justice condemned this as an attempt to influence the jury, as it could be construed that a jury could be encouraged to deliver a verdict that would receive such applause; he sentenced two men (identified by the Crown Solicitor as having applauded) to a week in prison for contempt. Over 10,000 people had come to hear the jury's verdict. According to Richard Allan's account published in the Ballarat Star, upon emerging from the courthouse, Joseph "was put in a chair and carried around the streets of the City in triumph with the greatest demonstrations of joy".

=== Succession of acquitals ===
Manning's case was the next to be heard. The remaining trials were then presided over by Victorian Chief Justice Redmond Barry, with all the other accused men being acquitted in quick succession except Dignum, whose indictment was withdrawn nolle prosequi. The remaining five were all tried together on 27 March. The lead defence counsel Archibald Michie observed that the proceedings had become "weary, stale, flat, dull and unprofitable." The trials have, on several occasions, been described as a farce.

=== Colonial Secretary rebukes Hotham ===
Following the acquittal of the thirteen prisoners, Lalor and all the other wanted Eureka Stockade rebels were granted a general amnesty on 9 May 1855. The Colonial Secretary Lord John Russell rebuked Hotham over the decision to prosecute them for treason, saying in a despatch:

respecting the trial of the prisoners taken at Ballarat, I wish to say that, although I do not doubt you have acted to the best of your judgment, and under advice, yet I question the expediency of bringing these rioters to trial under a charge of High Treason, being one so difficult of proof, and so open to objections of the kind which appear to have prevailed with the jury.

=== List of the thirteen indicted rebels ===
Name	Birth year	Birthplace	Verdict	Legacy and notes	Ref(s)
James Beattie	1823	Cumberland, England	not guilty	Beattie was one of the indicted rebels tried and acquitted in the 1855 Victorian High Treason trials. Witnesses stated that he volunteered to join a rebel company at the 29 December 1854 meeting at Bakery Hill. He then drilled and marched with the other rebels to the Eureka lead and was drilled again that and the following day. Beattie negotiated the perimeter of the stockade just before the shooting had ceased. Beattie had a large horse pistol that he dropped within the stockade when he saw troops outside. He either fell or drooped to his knees and cried for mercy, saying he "was beaten and would give in".	
James Macfie Campbell	unknown	Kingston, Jamaica	not guilty	Campbell was one of the indicted rebels tried and acquitted of high treason.	
Raffaello Carboni	1817	Urbino, Italy	not guilty	Carboni acted as Lalor's interpreter in dealing with some of the European miners. He was an eyewitness to the battle, seeking shelter in the chimney of his dwelling that was nearby the stockade. Subsequently indicted and acquitted in the high treason trials. Eureka folklore is deeply indebted to Carboni, who published the only full-length eyewitness account of the Eureka Rebellion later in 1855.	
Thomas Dignum	1836	Sydney, NSW	nolle prosequi	Dignum is among the four known native-born Australians at the Eureka Stockade and was one of the pikemen. Signed the Benden Hassell compensation petition. Carboni described him as a "serious looking, short, tight-built young chap" who "fought like a tiger" in the battle. He was one of the thirteen indicted rebels and succeeded in having the charge case dropped.	
John Joseph	1831	New York, USA	not guilty	Joseph was one of the rebels indicted and acquitted of high treason. He was praised for his performance under fire. Carboni said that Joseph was honest and kind and fired as part of the volley that killed Captain Wise. As an African American, doctor Charles Kenworthy did not act as Joseph's intermediary in an effort to secure his release as he did in relation to other Americans in legal jeopardy as a result of their involvement in the Eureka Rebellion. Joseph was tried first and acquitted. It is said that he was carried aloft in a chair by a joyous crowd around the streets of Melbourne.	
Timothy Hayes	1820	Kilkenny, Ireland	not guilty	Hayes was arrested on 3 December 1854 and was one of the rebels indicted and acquitted of high treason.	
John Manning	unknown	Ireland?	not guilty	Manning was a journalist who Carboni mentions as being present at the meeting where Peter Lalor was confirmed as rebel leader. Inspector Carter discovered him in the stockade's armoury when he stormed the tent. Carter arrested Manning himself and placed him into the custody of Lieutenant Richards of the 40th Regiment. Subsequently indicted and acquitted in the high treason trials.	
William Molly	unknown	unknown	not guilty	Molly was at the Eureka Stockade and detained and released. On 9 December 1854, along with Edward Sorrenson and Patrick Howard, he was indicted for high treason. Witness Edward Verit testified that near the conclusion of the attack, Molly was "being driven out" of the stockade and that "I collared him and took him. He had no arms that I saw".	
John Phelan	1882	The Cottage, Derry Kearn Abbey, Leix, Ireland	not guilty	Phelan was one of the rebels indicted and acquitted in the high treason trials. He had served as a juror on the James Scobie inquest. There is a legend that he and a miner named McGrath buried Lalor's amputated arm down an old alluvial shaft near the junction of present-day Princess and Meir Streets. Another is that he accompanied Lalor to a land auction while Lalor was still on the run. However, this seems unlikely, as Phelan was in police custody the whole time until his acquittal.	
Henry Reed	unknown	unknown	not guilty	Reed (or Read) was one of the rebels indicted and acquitted for high treason. Sub-Inspector Samuel Furnell saw Reed inside the Eureka Stockade on 3 December 1854, and it was alleged that he had fired on trooper Michael Lawler.	
Jacob Sorrenson	unknown	unknown	not guilty	Sorenson was arrested on 3 December 1854. He was committed to stand trial on 9 December 1854 along with William Molloy and Patrick Howard. Sorenson was described as heavily tattooed and illiterate.	
Michael Tuohy	1830	Scariff, County Clare, Ireland	not guilty	Was part of the contingent that traveled from Creswick contingent to the Eureka Stockade. He was detained by Corporal William Richardson whilst attempting to flee the stockade in possession of a double-barrelled shotgun. Subsequently spent most of his fortune pursuing a compensation claim over the loss of his mine.	
Jan Vennick	1823	Koedijk, the Netherlands	not guilty	Sometimes referred to as John Fenwick, Vennick was a non-combatant who was indicted and acquitted of high treason. He shared a tent with Cornelius Peters and Le Fronzis Romeo that was situated 300 yards away from the Eureka Stockade. At the time of the battle, German miner Edward Bloehm roused the three of them. The police surrounded the tent and called on the occupants to surrender. Vennick emerged wearing red trousers gaining the nickname "the captain". He was handcuffed and then struck with a sword, nearly severing his ear and sustaining three blows to the head. At the high treason trials, Peters was able to provide Vennick with an alibi, testifying that Vennick was working with him all day on 2 December 1854 and had been in the tent all night and on the morning when the stockade was overrun.	

== See also ==
- Eureka Flag
- Raffaello Carboni, indicted rebel and 1855 Eureka novelist

== Bibliography ==
- Blake, Gregory (2009). To Pierce the Tyrant's Heart: The Battle for the Eureka Stockade. Loftus, ACT: Australian Army History Unit. ISBN 978-0-98-047532-6.
- Corfield, Justin; Wickham, Dorothy; Gervasoni, Clare (2004). The Eureka Encyclopedia. Ballarat: Ballarat Heritage Services. ISBN 978-1-87-647861-2.
- MacFarlane, Ian (1995). Eureka from the Official Records. Melbourne: Public Record Office Victoria. ISBN 978-0-73-066011-8.
- Molony, John (1984). Eureka. Ringwood: Viking. ISBN 978-0-67-080085-8.
- Stoljar, Jeremy (2011). The Australian Book of Great Trials: The Cases That Shaped a Nation. Millers Point: Murdoch Books. ISBN 978-1-74-266131-5.
- Turnbull, Clive (1946). Eureka: The Story of Peter Lalor. Melbourne: Hawthorne Press.
- Wright, Clare (2013). The Forgotten Rebels of Eureka. Melbourne: Text Publishing. ISBN 978-1-92214-737-0.
