= Rod Marsh =

Australian cricketer (1947–2022)

Rod Marsh MBE
Personal information
- Full name: Rodney William Marsh
- Born: 4 November 1947; Armadale, Western Australia
- Died: 4 March 2022 (aged 74); Adelaide, South Australia
- Nickname: Bacchus, Iron Gloves
- Batting: Left-handed
- Bowling: Right-arm off break
- Role: Wicketkeeper
- Relatives: Graham Marsh (brother); Daniel Marsh (son)

International information
- National side: Australia
- Test debut (cap 249): 27 November 1970 v England
- Last Test: 6 January 1984 v Pakistan
- ODI debut (cap 7): 5 January 1971 v England
- Last ODI: 12 February 1984 v West Indies

Domestic team information
- Years: Team
- 1968/69–1983/84: Western Australia

Career statistics
Competition	Test	ODI	FC	LA
Matches	96	92	257	140
Runs scored	3,633	1,225	11,067	2,119
Batting average	26.51	20.08	31.17	23.03
100s/50s	3/16	0/4	12/55	0/9
Top score	132	66	236	99*
Balls bowled	72	0	142	23
Wickets	0	–	1	0
Bowling average	–	–	84.00	–
5 wickets in innings	–	–	0	–
10 wickets in match	–	–	0	–
Best bowling	–	–	1/0	–
Catches/stumpings	343/12	120/4	803/66	182/6
Medal record
Men's Cricket
Representing Australia
ICC Cricket World Cup
Runner-up	1975 England
- Source: Cricinfo, 20 November 2008

Rodney William Marsh MBE (4 November 1947 – 4 March 2022) was an Australian professional cricketer who played as a wicketkeeper for the Australian national team. He was a part of the Australian squad which finished as runners-up at the 1975 Cricket World Cup.

Marsh had a Test career spanning from the 1970–71 to the 1983–84 Australian seasons. In 96 Tests, he set a world record of 355 wicketkeeping dismissals, the same number his pace bowling Western Australian teammate Dennis Lillee achieved with the ball. The pair were known for their bowler–wicketkeeper partnership, which yielded 95 Test wickets, a record for any such combination. They made their Test debuts in the same series and retired from Test cricket in the same match. Wisden stated that "Few partnerships between bowler and wicket-keeper have had so profound an impact on the game."

Marsh had a controversial start to his Test career, selected on account of his batting abilities. Sections of the media lampooned Marsh's glovework, dubbing him "Iron Gloves" after sloppy catching in his debut Test. His keeping improved over time and by the end of his career he was regarded as one of the finest in the history of the sport. He was widely regarded for his sense of team discipline, in particular after Bill Lawry controversially declared the Australian first innings closed in the Fifth Test of the 1970–71 series at the MCG with Marsh eight runs short of a century. He was known for his athletic keeping. He was nicknamed Australia's marshal due to his ability to uplift the spirit and energy within the Australian side by having a word with opponent batsmen during his playing days which had also influenced a shift in momentum on several occasions where Australia would go on to win matches from precarious situations.

In 2009, Marsh was inducted into the ICC Cricket Hall of Fame.

== Early years ==
Marsh was born in the Perth suburb of Armadale on 4 November 1947 to Barbara and Ken Marsh. Marsh played backyard cricket with his older brother Graham, who became a professional golfer and won eleven times on the European Tour. Both brothers represented Western Australia at cricket at schoolboy level. Marsh played his first competitive match at the age of eight for the Armadale under-16s, where he also kept wicket. At thirteen he captained the state schoolboys' team, and joined the West Perth district club.

When he debuted for West Perth's first XI he was a specialist batsman, as Western Australia wicketkeeper Gordon Becker also represented the club. In order to further his keeping, Marsh joined the University club. He formed a bond with Dennis Lillee in 1966 at a time when Marsh was serving as a trainee teacher with the University Club. Since then, he has been dubbed as Lillee's partner-in-crime by pundits.

Marsh made his first-class debut for Western Australia, again as a specialist batsman, against the touring West Indies in 1968–69. He had an unusual match, scoring 0 and a whirlwind knock of 104 on state debut against a fancied West Indian bowling attack which comprised Garfield Sobers, Charlie Griffith and Wes Hall.

== Test career ==
Marsh replaced the retired Becker from the 1969–70 season. At the time, Australia was touring India and South Africa with Brian Taber and Ray Jordon as the team's wicketkeepers. In the autumn of 1970, an Australian second team toured New Zealand with John MacLean as wicketkeeper. Therefore, Marsh was behind these players in the pecking order. However, he was a controversial selection for the first Test of the 1970–71 Ashes series, replacing Taber; Marsh was selected for his batting.

The media was quick to criticise Marsh's glovework in his early career, dubbing him "Iron Gloves" after he missed a number of catches. Even on his debut in the First Test in the 1970–71 Ashes series he took four catches in his first innings. His batting proved invaluable on a number of occasions and in the Fifth Test he equalled the record for the highest Test innings by an Australian keeper, set by Don Tallon. The end of the innings was controversial; the captain Bill Lawry declared with Marsh eight runs short of a century so he could get an extra hour of bowling before stumps. When questioned by the press about his lost chance to make an historic century Marsh said he had gained forty runs instead of missing eight as he thought Lawry should have declared an hour earlier. Even though Marsh was unbeaten on 92 before declaration was made, Marsh emphasized first priority for the team before personal milestones and achievements. His gesture eventually would help him to win accolades and also to stamp a sense of authority and loyalty among the fans as well as among the teammates. Marsh later admitted that he was underprepared as a wicketkeeper, but he learned from watching his English counterpart Alan Knott. He and Knott did, however, concede the same number of byes in the series: 44.

Marsh became an integral part of the team as the side improved during the 1972 tour of England. He was deemed a strong gatekeeper to Australia's baggy green culture and was known for his authorship of Australian team victory song "Under the Southern Cross I Stand" which he co-opted from the original version of Henry Lawson's 1887 poem "Flag of the Southern Cross". Marsh initially had the role of leading the team in singing it, and on his retirement he passed it on to Allan Border.

It was revealed that it was Marsh who started the victory celebration by narrating the song following Australia's emphatic victory against England on the final day of the fifth and final test match on 16 August 1972 at The Oval where Australia successfully chased down 242 with 5 wickets to spare.

He became the first Australian keeper to hit a century by scoring 118 in the first Test against Pakistan at Adelaide in 1972–73. He also hit 236 against the tourists for Western Australia, the best score of his career. Playing a key role in Australia's series victories over England and the West Indies in the series of 1974–75 and 1975–76, Marsh made many acrobatic dives to catch balls delivered by Dennis Lillee and Jeff Thomson. He took 45 dismissals in those two series, including a world-record 26 catches in six Tests against the West Indies.

Marsh scored an unbeaten 110 in the second innings of the Centenary Test against England in 1977, becoming the first Australian wicketkeeper to score a Test century against England. In the same match he passed Wally Grout's Australian wicket-keeping record of 187 Test dismissals. He scored a further 16 half centuries. In first class matches, he accumulated 11 centuries including a best of 236, aggregating more than 10000 runs in his career.

When the breakaway World Series Cricket was formed, Marsh had no hesitation in signing for Kerry Packer. He claimed 54 dismissals in 16 Supertests. Upon his return to traditional international cricket in 1979–80, his age did not affect his keeping ability. On the 1981 tour of England, he took 23 dismissals to become the first wicketkeeper to take 100 dismissals in Ashes Tests, broke Knott's world record in 22 fewer Tests and passed 3000 runs in Test cricket.

He was the wicketkeeper, in the infamous underarm bowling incident of 1981 which happened during the 3rd final of the 1980–81 Australia Tri-Nation Series.

In 1982–83, his penultimate season, he took 28 dismissals against England, including nine and eight in the second and third Test, respectively. His batting form fell away towards the end of his Test career, his last 22 Tests yielding only 589 runs at an average of 19.63. On his final test match appearance against Pakistan at the Sydney Cricket Ground on 6 January 1984, he effected five dismissals and set a then world record for most test dismissals by a keeper at that time with 355. He also became the first keeper to reach 350 dismissals. Marsh's retirement coincided with those of Dennis Lillee and former Australia captain Greg Chappell.

== Style ==
Powerfully built, Marsh was regarded as an all rounder for the majority of his career. Coupled with his short stature, his power suited him to the task of keeping wicket. Despite his bulk, which forced him to work heavily on reducing his weight in his early career, he had fast foot movement, combined with fast anticipation and reflexes, which allowed him to cover more ground. He raised the role of wicketkeeper to a more prominent status in a team with his acrobatic diving, raucous appeals and habit of throwing a ball high into the air upon completing a dismissal. As the wicketkeeper, he made himself the focal point in the field and attempted to extract higher standards of concentration from both himself and his teammates. Speaking of his understanding with Lillee, he said, "I've played with him so much now that most of the time I know what he is going to do before he has bowled ... I know from the way he runs up; the angle, the speed, where he hits the crease, where the ball is going to be."

At state level, Marsh was a noted captain, leading Western Australia to a Sheffield Shield and Gillette Cup double in both forms of the game in 1976–77. He had nine wins and seven losses in 20 Shield matches as captain, and seven from nine matches in the limited overs competition.

Marsh was an effective player in ODI matches, contributing as a keeper and a lower order batsman. His power and aggression was put to good use in the closing overs, when he could score at a rapid rate. In one match against New Zealand in 1980–81 against Lance Cairns at the Adelaide Oval, he struck 26 from the final over, with three sixes and two fours, before falling on the final ball.

== Coaching and other non-playing duties ==
Marsh was a cricket commentator for Channel Nine's international matches between 1986–1990 and 1996–1998.

He was a coach at the Australian Cricket Academy in Adelaide since its inception and was its director from 1990 to 2001. Some of his former proteges include Australian internationals wicketkeeper–batsman Adam Gilchrist and fast bowlers Jason Gillespie and Brett Lee.

Marsh was the Director of the England and Wales Cricket Board (ECB) national academy from October 2001 to September 2005. During this time, England went from being a mediocre team to challenging Australia as the best team in Test cricket and in 2005, they regained the Ashes after 16 years in Australian hands with a 2–1 win. Marsh later criticised the ECB for releasing Troy Cooley, who had trained England's four pronged pace battery, and attacked Duncan Fletcher's selection of Geraint Jones as the wicket keeper ahead of Chris Read. He once declared his cricketing allegiance to England and was at one time a selector for the English team.

In August 2006, the South Australian Cricket Association announced Marsh had been appointed in a consultancy role to undertake a review of cricket throughout South Australia. Marsh had also worked with the Global Cricket Academy in Dubai.

He was included in a part-time capacity as a part of the Cricket Australia national selection panel in 2011. In 2011, in a newly created role by Cricket Australia he was asked to coach the coaches in order to ensure a unified approach to mentor the players across the states of Australia.

Marsh was appointed chairman of selectors for Cricket Australia on 2 May 2014, replacing John Inverarity. He was previously Cricket Australia's manager of elite coaching development. He felt the heat at times from former cricketers including Michael Slater for not selecting Usman Khawaja in the Australian playing XI especially during the Chappell-Hadlee ODI series in February 2016 in New Zealand.

On 16 November 2016, Marsh resigned as chairman of selectors, after a series defeat to South Africa.

== Honours ==
Marsh was made a Member of the Order of the British Empire in the 1982 New Year Honours and inducted into the Sport Australia Hall of Fame in 1985. He was named as one of Wisden's Cricketer of the Year in 1982. He received an Australian Sports Medal in 2000 and a Centenary Medal in 2001.

In 2005, he was inducted into the Cricket Hall of Fame by Cricket Australia.

Actor Brendan Cowell portrayed Rod Marsh in the 2012 Australian miniseries Howzat! Kerry Packer's War.

In 2015, he became the fourth Australian cricketer to deliver MCC Spirit of Cricket Cowdrey Lecture after Richie Benaud, Adam Gilchrist and Simon Taufel.

He received Honorary Life Membership of the Marylebone Cricket Club in 1988.

== Personal life and death ==
Marsh's son Daniel Marsh captained the Tasmanian cricket team in the absence of Ricky Ponting in the mid-2000s.

In 2010, he appeared in an episode of Who Do You Think You Are?, where it was revealed that his grandmother died after giving birth to one of his aunts, leading his grandfather to put their three children, including Marsh's father Ken, up for adoption.

On 24 February 2022, Marsh was left in a critical condition following a heart attack in Bundaberg, Queensland, whilst en route to a charity event hosted by Queensland Bulls Masters. He died eight days later, on 4 March 2022, in Adelaide, South Australia, at the age of 74.

His death came on the same day as that of fellow Australian cricket icon Shane Warne.

His funeral service was held at the Adelaide Oval on 17 March, and was hosted by James Brayshaw; amongst the tributes included a recorded eulogy by Adam Gilchrist.
