= Under the Southern Cross I Stand =

Australian cricket team song

"Under The Southern Cross I Stand" is the victory song of the Australian cricket team.

It is typically sung by the players in the style of a raucous chant after every victory and "treated with reverential consideration and respect" within the team. The official lyrics are as follows.

Under the Southern Cross I stand,
A sprig of wattle in my hand,
A native of my native land,
Australia, you fucking beauty!

The authorship of this "Under the Southern Cross I Stand" is credited to former wicketkeeper Rod Marsh, who was apparently inspired by Henry Lawson's 1887 poem, "Flag of the Southern Cross". Marsh initially had the role of leading the team in singing it, and on his retirement he passed it on to Allan Border. The other players to have taken on the role are David Boon (when Border took over the captaincy), Ian Healy (on Boon's retirement), Ricky Ponting (on Healy's retirement), Justin Langer (when Ponting took over the captaincy), and Michael Hussey (on Langer's retirement). Hussey passed it on to Nathan Lyon upon his retirement in January 2013. With Nathan Lyon's departure from the team due to injury after the Second Ashes Test at Lord's in 2023, custody of the song has passed to wicketkeeper Alex Carey.

The song is based upon the chorus of the 1890s patriotic song “Australia; or Heart to Heart and Hand to Hand”, written by the Rev. Thomas Hilhouse Taylor (1861–1925).

One source says that "The evidence suggests that this cricketers’ chant began as a patriotic song in the late 1890s, was turned into a military drinking song in the 1940s, and then finally developed into the victory song of the Australian cricket team in the 1970s. From such beginnings has this raucous verse become popular with cricket fans in general, and with Australians in particular."
