= John Manning (journalist) =

John Manning was an Irish nationalist, journalist, newspaper proprietor and newspaper editor. He was one of the thirteen indicted rebels in the 1855 Victorian high treason trials. During his childhood, Manning emigrated with his family to the United States, where he received an education in New York. As a young adult, he left the United States to participate in the Victorian gold rush.

John Manning probably came to Victoria in the late 1840s. During the Eureka Rebellion, he became a reporter for the Ballarat Times. While he was involved in a council to organise a defence and determine who would be the leader of the rebellion, he was only a spectator in the battle itself. Despite not actively participating in the battle, he was still indicted for high treason. He was acquitted along with the other twelve rebels in the 1855 Victorian high treason trials.

Following the Eureka Rebellion, he worked as a Roman Catholic teacher until late 1867, when he emigrated to New Zealand. There, he co-founded the New Zealand Celt, an Irish nationalist newspaper, alongside William John Larkin. Its first issue was published on 26 October 1867, and its last was likely published in June 1868.

Manning left New Zealand for San Francisco, California, on 26 November 1868. There, he became a writer for the Overland Monthly. Around 1876, he became the editor and proprietor of the American Celt, a short-lived newspaper based in Louisville, Kentucky.

In December 1904, he appeared at a Eureka Stockade anniversary event in Ballarat, where he gave a short talk on some of his experiences during the rebellion.
