= Lalor of Eureka =

1939 Australian stage play

- Written by: Leslie Rees
- Original language: English
- Subject: Eureka Rebellion
- Genre: historical drama

Premiere
- Date premiered: September 9, 1939
- Place premiered: New Theatre, Sydney

Lalor of Eureka is a 1939 Australian stage play about the Eureka Rebellion, written by Leslie Rees.

It won the New Theatre Play Award in 1940 for Best Australian Play of the Year.

It was one of several plays about the Eureka produced around this time, including Blood on the Wattle and Stockade. Discussing them, Leslie Rees wrote:

Eurekea as a subject consistently defies the most energetic and sincere attempts to render it on a stage... the historical events are themselves too naturally and objectively dramatic. They are so dramatic, as well as complicated, that any potential author is likely to be inhibited from a truly creative exercise of his dramatist’s functions. A rebellion doesn’t make drama neither does the burning of a hotel or a callous digger hunt. What makes drama is the light of individual human character shining through those events, and the impact of one character on another with those events as driving forces.

== Radio adaptation ==
The play was produced for radio on the ABC in 1943.
