= The Eureka Stockade (novel) =

1855 history novel by Raffaello Carboni

The Eureka Stockade: The Consequence of Some Pirates Wanting a Quarterdeck Rebellion
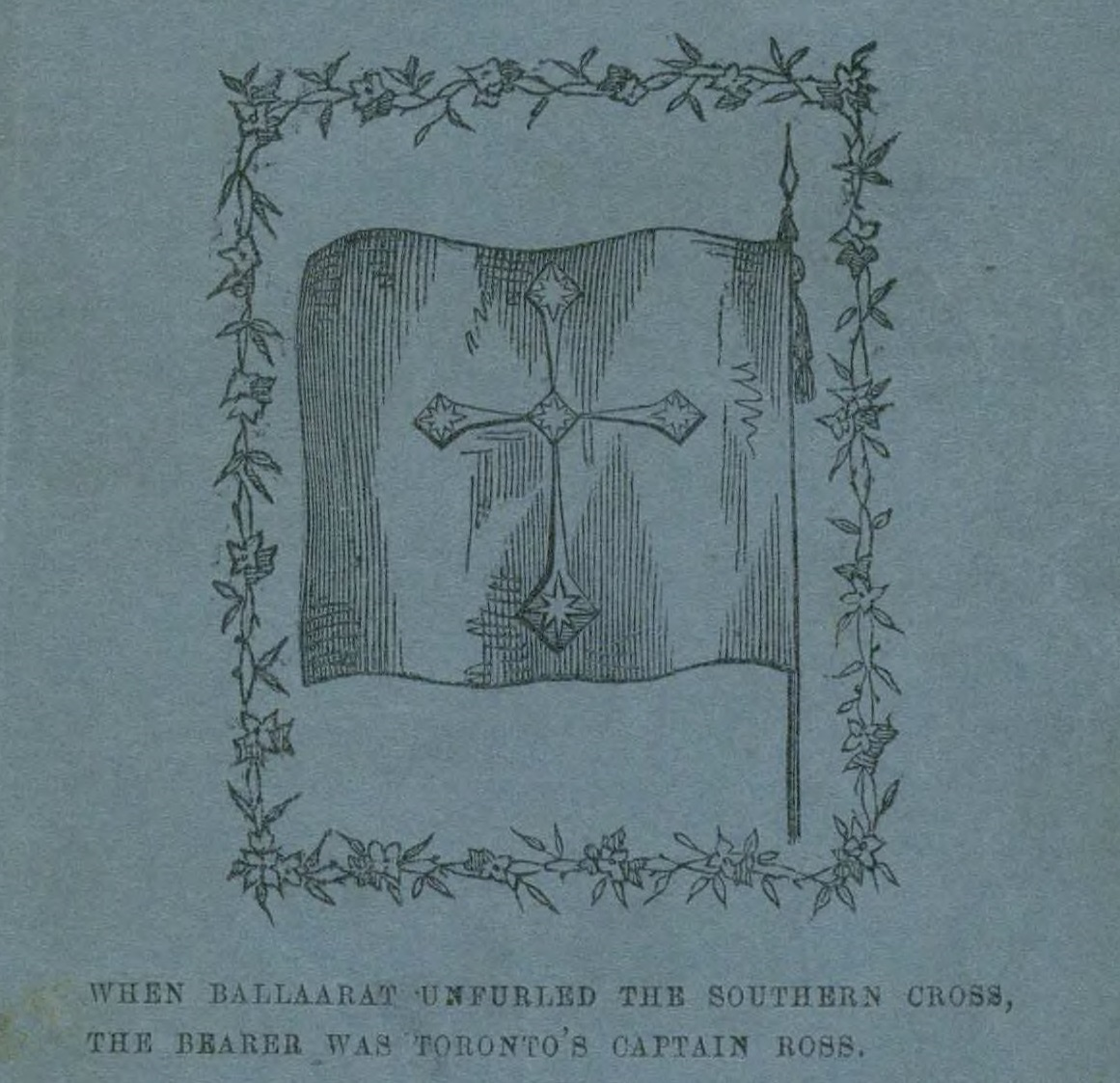
- Front cover of the first edition (1855)
- Author: Raffaello Carboni
- Language: English
- Genre: Narrative history
- Set in: Victoria, Australia
- Publisher: J. P. Atkinson and Co.
- Publication date: 1855
- Publication place: Melbourne
- Media type: Print (hardback & paperback)

The Eureka Stockade is an 1855 novel by Raffaello Carboni, who was present in Ballarat during the Eureka Rebellion. He lived near the Eureka Stockade and witnessed the battle on 3 December 1854 when the government forces defeated the rebel garrison. The Eureka folklore is deeply indebted to Carboni's novel, the first and only comprehensive eyewitness account of the Eureka Rebellion.

== Notable inconsistencies ==
One notable inconsistency in Carboni's account is that he describes the Eureka Flag as made of silk, and the cover of the first edition has an illustration that features diamond-shaped stars. These incorrect descriptions plagued early Eureka investigators such as Len Fox, with the fragments held by the Art Gallery of Ballarat being of cotton and mohair construction. However, the blue ground is said to have "a high sheen that gives a silk-like appearance." Eureka: From the Official Records has the three-man peace delegation meeting with Robert William Rede on 1 December 1854. Author Ian MacFarlane notes that Carboni, who accompanied George Black and Father Smyth on this occasion, "suggested in his The Eureka Stockade that this meeting took place on 30 November."

== Bibliography ==
- Carboni, Raffaello (1855). The Eureka Stockade: The Consequence of Some Pirates Wanting a Quarterdeck Rebellion. Melbourne: J. P. Atkinson and Co. – via Project Gutenberg.
- Fox, Len (1973). Eureka and its flag. Canterbury, Victoria: Mullaya Publications. ISBN 978-0-85-914004-1.
- MacFarlane, Ian (1995). Eureka from the Official Records. Melbourne: Public Record Office Victoria. ISBN 978-0-73-066011-8.
- Wickham, Dorothy; Gervasoni, Clare; D'Angri, Val (2000). The Eureka Flag: Our Starry Banner. Ballarat: Ballarat Heritage Services. ISBN 978-1-87-647813-1.
