= Eureka Stockade (miniseries) =

1984 Australian miniseries directed by Rod Hardy

- Genre: historical
- Written by: Tom Hegarty
- Directed by: Rod Hardy
- Starring: Bryan Brown; Bill Hunter; Carol Burns; Amy Madigan; Tom Burlinson
- Country of origin: Australia
- Original language: English
- No. of episodes: 3

Production
- Producer: Hector Crawford
- Running time: 2 hours each episode
- Production company: Crawfords
- Budget: $2.5 million

Original release
- Network: Seven Network
- Release: 27 March 1984 – 1984

Eureka Stockade is a 1984 Australian miniseries based on the battle of Eureka Stockade. It reunited the producer, writer and star of A Town Like Alice.

== Cast ==
- Bryan Brown as Peter Lalor
- Bill Hunter as Timothy Hayes
- Carol Burns as Anastasia Hayes
- Amy Madigan as Sarah Jamieson
- Tom Burlinson as Father Smythe
- Brett Cullen as Charles Ross
- Penelope Stewart as Alicia Dunne
- Stephen Hayes as Johan Gregorious
- Rod Mullinar as Frederick Vern
- Tim Hughes as Sgt. Major Tyler
- Roger L. Howell as Raffaello Carboni
- Edwin Hodgeman as Commissioner Rede
- David Ravenswood as Sir Charles Hotham
- Fred Steele as John Joseph
- Simon Chilvers as Bishop Goold
- John Murphy as Father Downing
- Tommy Dysart as Tom Kennedy
- Peter Crossley as Johnstone
- Sam Petersen as Johnny Hayes
- Reg Evans as Goodenough
- Luke Gallagher as 'Starry' Hayes
- Troy Ellis as William Hayes
- Melissa Crawford as Annie Hayes
- James Crawford as Timmy Hayes
- David Bradshaw as Sgt. Major Milne
- John Larking as Bentley
- Roger Oakley as Scobie
- Peter Collingwood as General Nickle
- Geoff Warren as Dr. Kenworthy
- Edward Caddick as Father Dunne
- Peter Curtin as Attorney General
- Lee James as Aspinall
- Ruth Yaffe as Mrs. Bentley
- Victor Kazan as John D'Ewes
- Chris Hession as James McGill
- William Zappa as Flash Burke
- Bruce Knappett as Peter Martin
- Andrew Martin as Hummfray
- Chris Hallam as Dr. D.J. Williams
- Tim Hardiman as Barnard Welch
- Anthony Hawkins as Dr. Stewart
- Peter Green as Patrick Carroll
- Frank Thring as Judge
- Peter Carroll as Narrator

== Production ==
The series was researched over two years and filmed over four months. It was shot on location near Ballarat and Bendigo. It was a difficult shoot as it took place during a heatwave. A $250,000 set of the British camp was almost destroyed during the Ash Wednesday bushfires. A Eureka flag was stolen during filming.

== Reception ==
The series was a ratings disappointment compared to A Town Like Alice. However it sold widely overseas and screened in the US.
