= Flag of the Southern Cross =

1887 poem by Australian writer Henry Lawson

- by Henry Lawson
- First published in: Truth
- Country: Australia
- Language: English
- Publication date: 1887

Full text
- Flag of the Southern Cross at Wikisource

"Flag of the Southern Cross" is a poem written in 1887 by Australian bush poet Henry Lawson. The title refers to the Eureka Flag flown at the Eureka Rebellion in Ballarat, Victoria in 1854. It was originally published in Truth, a Sydney newspaper.

The victory song of the Australian cricket team — "Under the Southern Cross I Stand" — is said to have been inspired by this poem.

== Publication history ==
After its initial newspaper publication it was then included in the following anthologies:

- Henry Lawson : Collected Verse : Vol 1. 1885-1900 edited by Colin Roderick, Angus & Robertson, 1967
- A Campfire Yarn : Henry Lawson Complete Works 1885-1900 edited by Leonard Cronin, Lansdowne, 1984

== See also ==
- 1887 in Australian literature
