= John Molony =

Australian historian, academic and author (1927–2018)

John Neylon Molony (15 April 1927 – 16 September 2018) was an Australian historian, academic and author. He was an Emeritus Professor of History at the Australian National University (ANU).

Molony's long academic career with the ANU began in 1964, when he was employed as a research assistant in medieval history in the school of social science. He was to go on to become head of the department of history and to hold the Manning Clark Chair of Australian History from 1982 until his retirement from the university in 1990. On his retirement, the ANU appointed Molony as an emeritus professor of history.

Following his retirement from the ANU in 1990, Molony was appointed to the Keith Cameron Professorship of Australian History at University College Dublin. He held this position until 1993.

In 1993, on his return to Australia, Molony was appointed to the Foundation Research Professorship in History at the Australian Catholic University in Canberra. He left the University in July 1996.

During the course of his career, Molony published a number of scholarly works on subjects as diverse as the encyclical of Pope Leo XIII and Ned Kelly to the bicentennial history of Australia, as well as numerous newspaper and journal articles, chapters in books and literary reviews. Out of all of his published works, Molony said that he believed his 2000 book, The Native-Born: The First White Australians, would be judged as his most significant original contribution to the writing of Australian history, stating: "I say this because the native-born had never been given the serious consideration they deserve for their contribution to the making of our nation. More than any other element, including the convict element, they made us what we in large measure remain today."

== Major publications ==
- The Roman Mould of the Australian Catholic Church, Melbourne, Melbourne University Press, 1969
- An Architect of Freedom: John Hubert Plunkett in New South Wales, 1832–1869, Canberra, ANU Press, 1973 ·
- The Emergence of Political Catholicism in Italy: Partito Popolare, 1919–1926, London, Croom Helm, 1977
- I Am Ned Kelly, Melbourne, Allen Lane, 1980
- Eureka, Melbourne, Viking, 1984
- The Penguin Bicentennial History of Australia, Melbourne, Viking, 1987
- The Worker Question: A New Historical Perspective on Rerum Novarum, Melbourne, Collins Dove, 1991
- A Soul Came into Ireland: Thomas Davis, 1814–1845, Dublin, Geography Publications, 1995
- The Native-Born: The First White Australians, Melbourne, Melbourne University Press, 2000
- Australia: Our Heritage, Melbourne, Australian Scholarly Publishing, 2005
- Captain James Cook: Claiming the Great South Land, Connor Court Publishing, 2016
