= Eureka Stockade (1907 film) =

- Directed by: George Cornwell; Arthur Cornwell
- Production company: Australasian Cinematograph Company
- Release date: 19 October 1907 (Melbourne)
- Running time: over 4,000 feet
- Country: Australia
- Languages: Silent film English intertitles
- Budget: £1,500

Eureka Stockade is a 1907 Australian silent film about the Eureka Rebellion. It was the second feature film made in Australia, following The Story of the Kelly Gang.

The film was made by George Cornwell, and his brother Arthur, who was a motor mechanic.

== Synopsis ==
The surviving seven-minute fragment (original length unknown) shows street scenes of Ballarat is believed to be part of the 1907 film, the second feature film made in Australia (after the 1906 production, The Story of the Kelly Gang). Other scenes in the lost reels of the film were believed to have included gold seekers leaving London; the issuing of licences; the rush at Canadian gully; the arrival of the first women at the goldfields; licence hunting; diggers chained to logs and rescued by mates; the murder of Scottish gold digger James Scobie; diggers burning Bentley's Hotel; the Rebellion; Peter Lalor addressing the miners; burning the licenses; building the stockade; troops storming the stockade; the stockade in ruins; and a look at Ballarat 55 years later

The Bendigo Independent described a screening in February 1908:

This picture illustrates, in a remarkable degree the ingenuity of biographists and shows to what extent the machine can ho used. Anumber of colored lantern slides of Ballarat - from the "fifties" to the "sixties" were first shown and the film was then put on. It pictured emigrants leaving England and followed them oversea 'to the goldfields and from rush to rush. The windlasses, cradles, tubs and dollies puddling machines, etc., were shown with realistio faithfulness to detail and those present frequently broke out into applause. When the actual hostilities commenced at Eureka between miners on the one side and police and soldiers on" tho other, there was much excitement and the sensational incidents of the stockade as the biograph unwound them were keenly watched. The arrival of the first woman on tho goldfields was another event. Tho diggors oould he seen doffing their tall hats as she walked to the enmp, accompanied by her husband. Tho fluttering of the first diggings woman's washing on a clothes line between the tents caused much amusement. Mr. Rupert Cuthbert, the well-known motropollitantan vocalist, contributed several ballads at intervals in pleasing style.

== Cast ==
- Con Burrow

== Production ==
In September 1907 it was reported that C Cornwall "bioscope expert of Melbourne" was working on the film with Con. Burrow to make the film in Ballarat over several weeks. Burrow had been stage manager of many shows involving the Eureka Stockade and the early history of Ballarat. Filming finished on 28 September.

According to one account, Geffrey Nye arrived in Ballarat in January 1908 t make a film about the Eureka Stockade in Ballarat.

== Release ==
The film was first screened in the Athenaeum Hall, Melbourne on 19 October 1907 for a two-week season.

=== Critical ===
It impressed critics of the time. Table Talk called it "exciting and interesting from start to finish." It was reported to played to "large houses". The Age said "the film is one of the best ever shown and highly educational. The Bulletin wrote a review which stated:

[The film] impresses me. It begins with emigrants for Australia shipping at a London office in 3851. A placard outside announces the gold discoveries. The people are quaintly dressed in costumes of the time, the men chiefly in belltoppers and the women all in bonnets. However short of the possible the Eureka scenes might be, they stirred me to the core. Goodenough, the spy, was effectively introduced, with dramatic touches. A stockader pursues him to his death, a la Walmotee and M'Closkey. The Stockade was built in an authentic way. Then pains had been taken to represent the hiding of the wounded Lalor, and it was different again to the fancy. The unveiling of the Lalor Statue, Ballarat, was done ove r again, with an impromptu shouting crowd. What tremendous possibilities there are in the biograph !

The Bendigo Advertiser said "though the pictures were accompanied by a marring flicker, resembling a consta.nl rainfall, the treatment of the subject—interesting to all lovers of Australian liislory- -was decidedly clever, and applause frequently punctuated the progress of the performance."

The Argus called it "a very fair success".

The film then toured regional Victoria. However the Cornwells wound up their film company in March 1908.

The movie was forgotten until Ealing Studios decided to make a film about the story in 1946.

The surviving 307 feet (94 m) of the 35mm film (5 mins @ 18fps) is stored at the National Film and Sound Archive.

== See also ==
- List of Australian films before 1910
