= Raffaello Carboni =

Italian composer and author

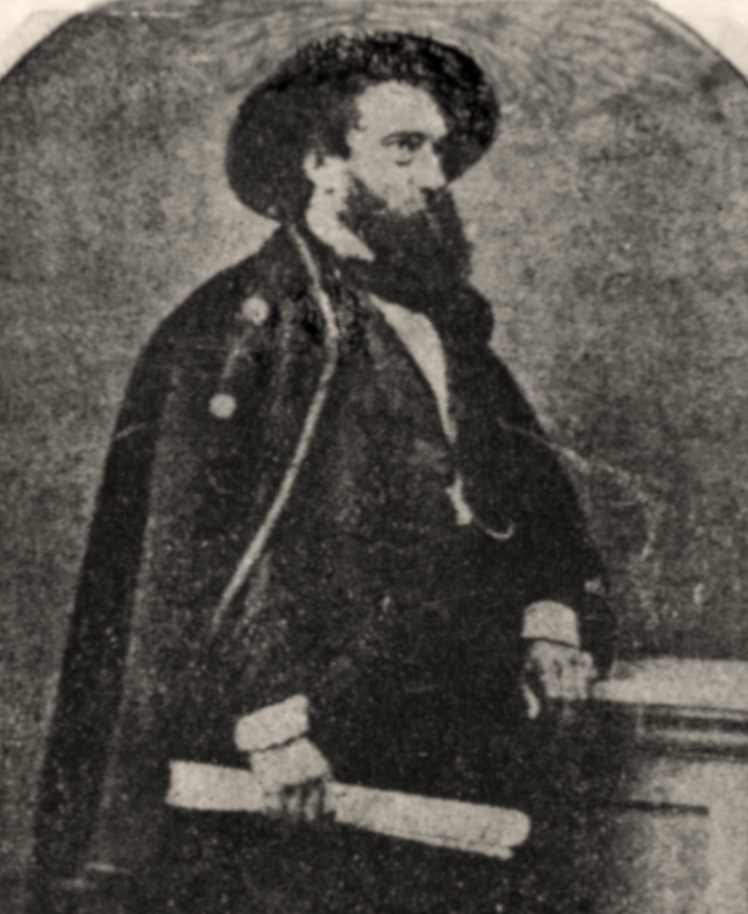
- Born: 15 December 1817; Urbino, Italy
- Died: 24 October 1875 (aged 57); Rome, Italy

Raffaello Carboni (15 December 1817 – 24 October 1875) was an Italian writer, composer and interpreter who wrote a book on the Eureka Stockade which he witnessed while living in Australia. Although only a spectator at the Eureka Rebellion he was charged with treason in the Supreme Court of Victoria, but found not guilty of the charge and released on 21 March 1855.

Carboni left Australia on 18 January 1856 for Europe. After periods of travelling, he returned to Italy, where he died in Rome in 1875.

== Biography ==
Raffaello Carboni was born in Urbino, Italy in 1817. Dedicated to the cause of Italian nationalism, he fought with the forces of Mazzini and Garibaldi to free Italy from Austrian influence. After the fall of the Roman Republic (1849–1850), he fled to London and then to Melbourne, Australia. He arrived on the Ballarat goldfields in 1853 and became a member of the miners' central committee. By the time of the Eureka Rebellion, he had been on or around the goldfields for almost two years. On 30 November 1854, he called on all miners "irrespective of nationality, religion or colour to salute the Southern Cross as a refuge of all the oppressed from all countries on Earth." When the stockade was attacked on 3 December 1854, he remained a spectator. He was, however, arrested and tried for treason, but later acquitted in March, having been taken ill with dysentery in gaol. In July 1855, Carboni was elected to the local court at Ballarat to adjudicate mining disputes. His book, The Eureka Stockade, the only complete first-hand description and analysis of the causes of the attack on the Eureka Stockade, was published a year after the uprising.

Carboni became a naturalised British citizen, but left Australia on 18 January 1856, sailing in the Impératrice Eugénie, and using some of the gold found at Ballarat to pay for his travels. After three years' travel during which he visited Jerusalem and Bethlehem, he returned to Italy and worked for a time as an interpreter with the French army at Milan. He later transferred to Genoa where Agostino Bertani was organizing troops and supplies for the 'Expedition of the Thousand' to Sicily. Carboni left Genoa in the 'Veloce' for Palermo, where he arrived on 24 June. His knowledge of languages afforded him a position of responsibility, and he worked in the administration as interpreter and translator, starting in the office of the statesman Francesco Crispi. For a time, he was entrusted with the secret Anglo-Italian correspondence between Crispi and Lord John Russell.

Following demobilisation, he travelled in Europe for a time, then settled in Naples for reasons of health. There he continued to publish his works, having already offered Rita (1859), La Campana Della Gancia (1861) and La Santola (1861), copies of which he sent to Peter Lalor and Sir Redmond Barry. These and other works were separate items of his two Magna Opera, Lo Scotta-o-Tinge, a collection of libretti and plays, and La Ceciliana, their musical counterpart. None was represented on the stage, nor has his music been publicly performed. He died in Rome at the St James Hospital, aged 58.

Carboni would sign himself as "Carboni Raffaello" and was also known as "Charles Raffaello" during his lifetime.

He was a character in the 1949 film Eureka Stockade.
