= List of think tanks =

This article is a list of notable think tanks sorted by country.

== Afghanistan ==
- Afghanistan Institute of Peace

== Albania ==
- Albanian Institute for International Studies

== Argentina ==
- Balseiro Institute
- Institute of Scientific and Technical Research for Defense
- Leloir Institute
- National Agricultural Technology Institute
- National Atomic Energy Commission
- National Institute of Industrial Technology
- National Scientific and Technical Research Council

== Australia ==
- Air Power Australia
- Asia Education Foundation
- Asialink
- Australia Institute (TAI)
- Australian Fabian Society
- Australian Institute of International Affairs (AIIA)
- Australian Institute of Policy and Science
- Australian Strategic Policy Institute (ASPI)
- Bennelong Society
- Beyond Zero Emissions
- Breakthrough – National Centre for Climate Restoration
- Brisbane Institute
- Centre for Independent Studies (CIS)
- Centre for Policy Development
- Centre for Public Integrity (Australia)
- Chifley Research Centre
- Christian Research Association
- Committee for Economic Development of Australia
- Common Cause (South Australia)
- Development Policy Centre
- Doctors Reform Society of Australia
- East Asian Bureau of Economic Research (EABER)
- Energy Policy Institute of Australia
- Evatt Foundation
- Grattan Institute
- H.R. Nicholls Society
- Infrastructure Partnerships Australia
- Institute of Public Affairs (Australia) (IPA)
- International Energy Centre
- International WaterCentre
- Laboratory for Visionary Architecture
- Lowy Institute
- Menzies Research Centre
- National Civic Council
- Perth USAsia Centre
- Prosper Australia
- Psychology Beyond Borders
- Public Interest Journalism Initiative
- Samuel Griffith Society
- SEARCH Foundation
- Strategic and Defence Studies Centre (SDSC)
- Sydney Institute
- Tasman Institute
- The Green Institute
- The McKell Institute
- The Warren Centre for Advanced Engineering
- TJ Ryan Foundation
- United States Studies Centre
- Western Australia Policy Forum

== Austria ==
- European Institute for Counter Terrorism and Conflict Prevention

== Azerbaijan ==
- Center for Analysis of Economic Reforms and Communication (CAERC)
- Center for Economic and Social Development (CESD)

== Bangladesh ==
- Bangladesh Institute of Development Studies (BIDS)
- Bangladesh Institute of Law and International Affairs (BILIA)
- Bangladesh Institute of Peace and Security Studies (BIPSS)
- Centre for Policy Dialogue (CPD)
- Making Our Economy Right (MOER)

== Belgium ==
- Bruegel
- Centre for European Policy Studies
- Centre for the New Europe
- Egmont
- European Centre on the International Political Economy
- European Policy Centre
- Global Governance Institute
- International Crisis Group
- Itinera Institute
- Liberales
- Nova Civitas
- Vlaamse Volksbeweging

== Bosnia and Herzegovina ==
- Foreign Policy Initiative BH

== Brazil ==
- Fundação Getúlio Vargas
- Institute of Applied Economic Research
- Plataforma Cipó
- InterAgency Institute

== Canada ==
- Asia Pacific Foundation of Canada
- Atlantic Institute for Market Studies
- Atlantic Provinces Economic Council
- Broadbent Institute
- C. D. Howe Institute
- Caledon Institute of Social Policy
- Canada West Foundation
- Canadian Centre for Policy Alternatives
- Canadian Global Affairs Institute
- Canadian Institute for Advanced Research
- Canadian International Council
- Canadian Tax Foundation
- Cascade Institute
- Centre for International Governance Innovation
- Conference Board of Canada
- Council of Canadians
- Fraser Institute
- Frontier Centre for Public Policy
- Institute for Liberal Studies
- Institute for Research on Public Policy
- International Institute for Sustainable Development
- Justice Centre for Constitutional Freedoms
- Macdonald-Laurier Institute
- Montreal Economic Institute
- Mowat Centre
- North-South Institute
- Pembina Institute
- Public Policy Forum
- Wellesley Institute

== Chile ==
- Centro de Estudios Públicos
- Libertad y Desarrollo

== China ==
- China Center for International Economic Exchanges
- China Development Institute
- Chinese Academy of Social Sciences
- Chinese Academy of Sciences
- Shanghai Academy of Social Sciences
- State Information Center of China
- Taihe Institute
- Center for China and Globalization
- People's Liberation Army Academy of Military Sciences
- China Institute for Innovation and Development Strategy
- China Development Institute
- China Institute of International Studies
- China Institutes of Contemporary International Relations

== Costa Rica ==
- Facultad Latinoamericana de Ciencias Sociales

== Croatia ==
- ZRIN - Institute for Development and Sustainability of Croatia https://www.zrin-institut.hr/

== Czech Republic ==
- CEVRO
- Institute for Social and Economic Analyses
- Liberální institut

== Denmark ==
- CEPOS
- Copenhagen Institute
- Copenhagen Institute for Futures Studies

== European Union ==
- European Council on Foreign Relations
- Global Governance Institute
- Leap2020
- OneEurope

== Egypt ==
- Al-Ahram Center for Political and Strategic Studies

== Finland ==
- Åland Islands Peace Institute
- Crisis Management Initiative
- Demos Helsinki
- European Centre of Excellence for Countering Hybrid Threats
- Finnish Institute of International Affairs
- Research Institute of the Finnish Economy

== France ==
- Centre d'Etudes Prospectives et d'Informations Internationales (CEPII)
- Cercle de l'Oratoire
- Conférence Olivaint
- European Union Institute for Security Studies
- Gracques
- Groupement de recherche et d'études pour la civilisation européenne
- Institut Choiseul for International Politics and Geoeconomics
- Institut français des relations internationales (IFRI)
- Institut Montaigne
- Jacques Delors Institute
- Mont Pelerin Society
- Saint-Simon Foundation
- Sport and Citizenship

== Georgia ==
- Georgian Foundation for Strategic and International Studies
- New Economic School – Georgia

== Germany ==
- Atlantic Community
- Bonn International Center for Conversion
- Bundesakademie für Sicherheitspolitik
- Centre for European Policy
- Center for Monitoring, Analysis and Strategy (CeMAS)
- Deutsche Gesellschaft für auswärtige Politik
- Friedrich Ebert Foundation
- Friedrich Naumann Foundation
- German Advisory Council on Global Change (WBGU)
- German Institute for Economic Research (DIW)
- German Institute for International and Security Affairs
- German Institute of Global and Area Studies
- Hanns Seidel Foundation
- Heinrich Böll Foundation
- Ifo Institut für Wirtschaftsforschung (IFO)
- Konrad Adenauer Foundation
- Peace Research Institute Frankfurt
- Rosa Luxemburg Foundation
- Stiftung Neue Verantwortung (SNV)
- Stiftung Wissenschaft und Politik (SWP)
- Walter Eucken Institut

== Greece ==
- Centre of Planning and Economic Research (KEPE)
- Hellenic Foundation for European and Foreign Policy (ELIAMEP)
- International Center for Black Sea Studies (ICBSS)

== Hong Kong ==
- Bauhinia Foundation Research Centre
- Central Policy Unit – a government department
- Civic Exchange
- HKGolden50
- Hong Kong Democratic Foundation
- New Century Forum
- One Country Two Systems Research Institute
- Our Hong Kong Foundation
- Path of Democracy
- The Global Institute for Tomorrow
- The Lion Rock Institute
- The Professional Commons

== Hungary ==
- Centre for Fair Political Analysis
- Danube Institute
- Millennium Institute

== India ==
- Association for Democratic Reforms (ADR) – New Delhi
- Public Policy and Governance Society (PPGS) – IIT Kharagpur
- Centre for Civil Society (CCS) – New Delhi
- Centre for Policy Research (CPR) - New Delhi
- Centre for Public Policy Research – Kochi, Kerala
- Chennai Centre for China Studies (CCCS)
- Foundation for Democratic Reforms (FDR) – Hyderabad, Telangana
- Indian Institute of Corporate Affairs (IICA) - New Delhi
- Institute for Defence Studies and Analyses (IDSA)
- Nabakrushna Choudhury Centre for Development Studies (NCDS), Bhubaneswar
- Observer Research Foundation (ORF) – New Delhi
- Public Health Foundation of India (PHFI) – New Delhi
- Strategic Foresight Group (SFG) – Mumbai
- Tillotoma Foundation (TF) – New Delhi and Kolkata
- United Service Institution of India (USI-India) – New Delhi
- RisingIndia ThinkTank (Venture Studio, Bangalore) – Chittorgarh, Rajasthan
- Indic Researchers Forum (IRF) - New Delhi
- Vivekananda International Foundation (VIF) – New Delhi

== Indonesia ==
- Centre for Strategic and International Studies (CSIS)

== Ireland ==
- Institute of International and European Affairs (IEA)
- Iona Institute
- TASC (Think-Tank for Action on Social Change)

== Iran ==
- Association for Iranian Studies
- Foundation for Iranian Studies
- Institute of Iran and Eurasia Studies (Iras)
- Ravand Institute
- Scandinavian Society for Iranian Studies

== Israel ==
- Begin-Sadat Center for Strategic Studies
- Institute for Advanced Strategic and Political Studies
- Institute for National Security Studies
- Israel Council on Foreign Relations
- Israel Democracy Institute
- Jerusalem Center for Public Affairs
- Jerusalem Institute for Strategy and Security (JISS)
- Jerusalem Institute for Policy Research
- Kohelet Policy Forum
- Reut Institute
- Shaharit
- Shalem Center
- Shalom Hartman Institute
- Van Leer Jerusalem Institute

== Italy ==
- Bruno Leoni Institute
- Centro Studi Internazionali
- Club of Rome
- European University Institute
- Future Italy
- Institute for International Political Studies (ISPI)
- Istituto Affari Internazionali
- Trinità dei Monti

== Japan ==
- Asian Development Bank Institute
- Genron NPO
- Institute of Developing Economies (IDE-JETRO)
- Japan Institute of International Affairs
- National Institute for Research Advancement (NIRA)

== Kazakhstan ==
- Kazakhstan Institute for Strategic Studies (KISS)

== Kenya ==
- Kenya Institute for Public Policy Research and Analysis

== Lebanon ==
- Issam Fares Institute for Public Policy and International Affairs
- Synaps

== Malaysia ==
- Institute for Democracy and Economic Affairs (IDEAS)
- IDE Research Centre @ Institut Darul Ehsan (IDE)

== Mexico ==
- Center of Research for Development (CIDAC)
- Instituto de Pensamiento Estratégico Ágora (IPEA)

== Netherlands ==
- Center for European Renewal
- Edmund Burke Foundation
- International Institute for Research and Education
- Netherlands Institute for Multiparty Democracy
- Netherlands Institute of International Relations Clingendael
- The Hague Centre for Strategic Studies
- The Hague Institute for Global Justice
- Wiardi Beckman Foundation (PvdA)

== New Zealand ==
- Centre for Strategic Studies New Zealand
- Helen Clark Foundation
- Maxim Institute
- McGuinness Institute
- Motu Economic and Public Policy Research
- New Zealand Initiative
- New Zealand Institute (2004–2012)
- New Zealand Institute of Economic Research

== Nigeria ==
- African Centre for Development and Strategic Studies (ACDESS)
- National Institute of Policy and Strategic Studies (NIPSS)
- Nigerian Economic Summit Group (NESG)
- Nigerian Institute of International Affairs (NIIA)

== Pakistan ==
- Applied Economics Research Centre (AERC)
- Centre for Aerospace and Security Studies (CASS)
- Institute of Policy Studies (IPS)
- Institute of Regional Studies(IRS)
- Institute of Strategic Studies (ISS)
- Islamabad Policy Research Institute (IPRI)
- Pakistan Academy of Sciences
- Capacity Analytics
- Pakistan Institute of Development Economics (PIDE)
- Pakistan Institute of International Affairs (PIIA)
- Social Policy and Development Centre (SPDC)
- [{National Institute of Maritime Affairs}] (NIMA)

== Philippines ==
- Center for Research and Communication (CRC)
- Foreign Service Institute (FSI)

== Poland ==
- Centre for Eastern Studies (OSW)
- Institute of Economics
- Polish Institute of International Affairs
- Sobieski Institute
- The Casimir Pulaski Foundation (FKP)

== Russia ==
- Agentura.Ru
- Carnegie Moscow Center (United States–based)
- Center for Strategic Research (Russia)
- Central Economic Mathematical Institute
- Centre for Analysis of Strategies and Technologies
- Civil Society Development Foundation
- Dialogue of Civilizations (DOC) (Berlin-based)
- Gorchakov Fund
- INSOR
- Institute for Election Systems Development
- Institute for US and Canadian Studies
- Institute of Democracy and Cooperation (IDC) (Paris-based)
- Institute of World Economy and International Relations
- Izborsky club
- Russian Institute for Strategic Studies (RISI)
- Russian International Affairs Council (RIAC)
- SOVA Center
- Valdai Discussion Club

== Saudi Arabia ==
- King Abdullah Petroleum Studies and Research Center

== Serbia ==
- Balkan Trust for Democracy
- Centre for Contemporary Politics
- European Fund for the Balkans
- Institute of International Politics and Economics
- Institute of Political Studies in Belgrade

== Singapore ==
- East Asian Institute (Singapore)
- Institute of Policy Studies
- ISEAS – Yusof Ishak Institute
- Official Monetary and Financial Institutions Forum
- Singapore Institute of International Affairs
- S. Rajaratnam School of International Studies

== Slovakia ==
- Forum Minority Research Institute
- Globsec
- Institute for Public Affairs (IVO)

== South Africa ==
- Centre for Conflict Resolution
- Free Market Foundation
- Institute for Security Studies

== South Korea ==
- Korea Development Institute
- National Assembly Budget Office
- The Asan Institute for Policy Studies
- Samsung Economic Research Institute
- Center for Free Enterprise
- Korea International Trade Association
- The Yeouido Institute
- The Economic Information and Education Center
- Jeju Peace Institute
- Korea Institute for International Economic Policy
- Korea Institute of Public Administration
- Sejong Institute

== Spain ==
- Barcelona Centre for International Affairs (CIDOB)
- Club of Madrid
- Elcano Royal Institute
- Foundation for Analysis and Social Studies (FAES)
- FRIDE
- Fundación Alternativas
- IDEAS Foundation for progress
- Real Academia de Ciencias Morales y Políticas
- Royal Institute of European Studies (RIEE)

== Sri Lanka ==
- International Water Management Institute
- Lakshman Kadirgamar Institute of International Relations and Strategic Studies
- LIRNEasia

== Sweden ==
- Captus
- Eudoxa
- Ratio Institute
- Stockholm International Peace Research Institute
- Timbro

== Switzerland ==
- Avenir Suisse
- Center for Security Studies
- foraus · Swiss Forum on Foreign Policy
- Geneva Centre for Security Policy
- Geneva Centre for the Democratic Control of Armed Forces
- Geneva International Centre for Humanitarian Demining
- Gottlieb Duttweiler Institute
- Horasis
- Liberales Institut
- World Economic Forum

== Taiwan ==
- Chung-Hua Institution for Economic Research
- Industrial Technology Research Institute
- Institute for Information Industry
- Institute for National Defense and Security Research
- National Applied Research Laboratories
- Prospect Foundation
- Taiwan Asia Exchange Foundation
- Taiwan Competitiveness Forum
- Taiwan External Trade Development Council
- Taiwan Foundation for Democracy
- Taiwan Institute of Economic Research

== Turkey ==
- Al Sharq Forum
- Foreign Policy Institute (FPI)
- Foundation for Political, Economic and Social Research (SETA)
- Global Political Trends Center (GPoT Center)
- Global Relations Forum (GRF)
- Intellectuals' Hearth
- SHURA Energy Transition Center
- Turkish Economic and Social Studies Foundation (TESEV)

== Ukraine ==
- Centre of Policy and Legal Reform (CPLR)
- Center for Policy Studies in Ukraine
- International Centre for Policy Studies (ICPS)
- The Razumkov Centre
- Transatlantic Dialogue Center (TDC)

== United Arab Emirates ==
- Gulf Research Center

== United Nations ==
- United Nations University (UNU)
- Global Governance Institute (GGI)
