= ISEA =

ISEA may refer to:

- Icosahedral Snyder Equal Area, see geodesic grid
- Independent Schools Education Association
- Institute for Social and Economic Analyses
- Inter-Society for the Electronic Arts (now ISEA International)
- International Safety Equipment Association, formerly the Industrial Safety Equipment Association
- International Society of Exposure Analysis (ISEA), now International Society of Exposure Science
- ISEA (Int'l Space Exploration Agency), in the TV series Extant
- ISEA International, organization that coordinates the annual International Symposium on Electronic Art
- International Sustainable Energy Assessment, see Energy and Environmental Security Initiative
- Island South-East Asia or Maritime Southeast Asia

== People ==
- Rafael Isea (born 1968), Venezuelan politician

== See also ==
- Institute of Southeast Asian Studies (ISEAS), see Singapore Think Tanks
