= Center for Policy Studies (disambiguation) =

"Center for Policy Studies" and "Centre for Policy Studies" are names used by multiple political think tanks and academic organizations. It may refer to:

== Organizations ==
- Center for Policy Studies, an academic unit within Central European University
- Center for Policy Studies in Ukraine, a non-governmental think tank headquartered in Lviv
- Centre for Policy Studies, a British policy think tank associated with the Conservative Party
- Centre for Policy Studies, a defunct Australian think tank founded by economist Michael G. Porter
- International Centre for Policy Studies, a non-governmental Ukrainian think tank headquartered in Kyiv
