= List of think tanks in Singapore =

Following is a list of notable think tanks in Singapore.

- Asia Competitiveness Institute
- The Centre for Strategic Energy and Resources (CSER) was established in 2022 as an independent think-and-do tank in Singapore with a mission to build enabling ecosystems to accelerate energy transition in Asia.
- The Centre for International Law was established in 2009 at the National University of Singapore.
- Energy Studies Institute
- The Institute of Policy Studies was established in 1988 and focuses on strategic policy research and discussion.
- The Institute of Southeast Asian Studies is a regional research institute for the study of social-political, security and economic trends and developments in Southeast Asia.
- Lee Kuan Yew School of Public Policy
- S. Rajaratnam School of International Studies
- Singapore Institute of International Affairs
- Singapore International Foundation

== See also ==
- List of think tanks
