= Foraus =

Swiss-based think tank

Forum Aussenpolitik Forum de politique étrangère Forum di politica estera
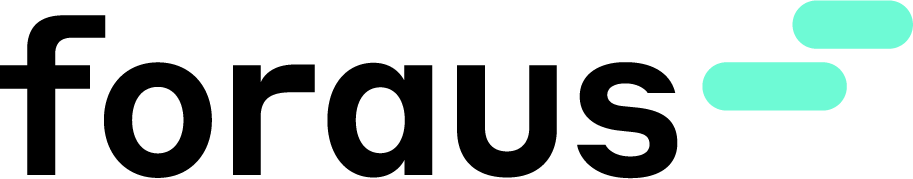
- Abbreviation: foraus
- Formation: 2009; 17 years ago
- Type: Think tank
- Headquarters: Bern
- Region served: Switzerland; Europe
- President: Elisa Cadelli
- Website: foraus.ch

foraus (German: Forum Aussenpolitik, French: Forum de politique étrangère, Italian: Forum di politica estera) is a thinktank on Swiss foreign policy. It is headquartered in Bern and has another office in Geneva, it works according to the grassroots principle, based on 9 regional groups across Switzerland. Most of its members are academic scholars, students and young professionals, who produce evidence-based discussion papers to be used as recommendations for decision makers and a broader public. The think tank organises events and is funded through membership fees as well as through the support of foundations and private donors.

== History ==
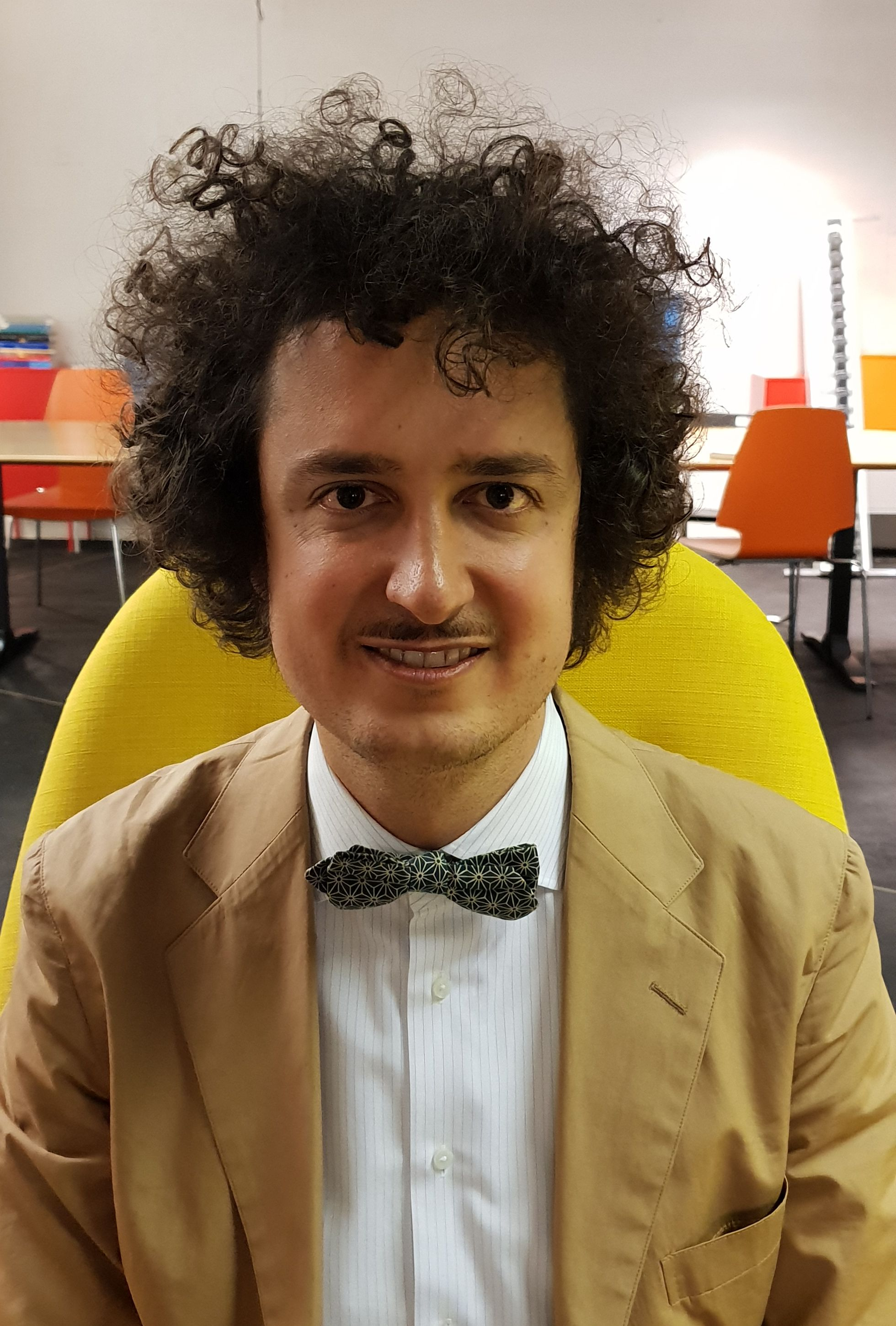
Nicola Forster

foraus was established in autumn 2009 by students from Zürich, Geneva and Bern. The idea of a grassroots think tank was developed by founders Nicola Forster and Pablo Padrutt. foraus is present with regional chapters in Swiss cities with a university.

In 2017, Foraus began to work on the Open Think Tank Network of participatory think tanks together with sister organisations in Berlin (Polis 180), London (Agora), Paris (argo), and Vienna (Ponto).

== Activities ==
Foraus aims to provide a contribution to foreign policy in Switzerland through evidence-based contribution and to promote a constructive dialogue based on academic research.

The head office is located in Bern, while the Geneva office coordinates the activities in the French-speaking region as well as the relations with the international organisations. There are foraus regional groups in many Swiss university towns (Basel, Bern, Fribourg, Geneva, Lausanne, Lucerne, Neuchâtel, St. Gallen and Zürich). The president of foraus is Elisa Cadelli and the co-president is Marie Juillard. The co-directors are Sereina Capatt and Marie Hürlimann.

The three main activities of foraus are the publication of discussion papers on all aspects of Swiss foreign policy, the organisation of events, and the communication with media, the broad public and decision-makers.

=== Publications ===
foraus releases discussion papers and policy briefs on current issues on a regular basis. Focus points are the implications of national referendums for Switzerland's foreign policy, and the challenges related to immigration and the Switzerland-EU relations. The contents of the publications are developed in 11 thematic programmes (development policy; Europe; peace and security; global governance; migration; environment, transport and energy; international law and human rights). In the framework of the prospective withdrawal form the European Union (Brexit), foraus studies on the post-Brexit institutional options gathered substantial attention in the United Kingdom.

=== Events ===
The think tank organizes workshops, panels and conferences with high-level politicians, diplomats and scholars on a regular basis. foraus events are regularly attended by Swiss decision makers and opinion leaders, including many past and current members of the national government, but also international guests such as José Manuel Barroso, Enrico Letta and Joseph Stiglitz.

=== Policy Kitchen ===
Foraus has developed its own digital policy innovation platform called Policy Kitchen. The tool is designed to foster collaboration across borders.

== See also ==
- List of think tanks
- Foreign Relations of Switzerland
- Switzerland–European Union relations
