= Economic Research Center =

Azerbaijani think tank

- Abbreviation: ERC
- Formation: 1999
- Type: Nonprofit think tank
- Legal status: Nonprofit organization
- Headquarters: Azerbaijan
- Region served: Azerbaijan
- Director (former): Gubad Ibadoghlu

The Economic Research Center (ERC) is a policy-research oriented nonprofit think tank founded in 1999 that strives to facilitate sustainable economic development and good governance in the New Public Management system of Azerbaijan.

The Azerbaijani authorities made it illegal for NGOs to receive foreign funding in 2014, and in addition to that, the bank accounts of the Economic Research Center were frozen. The Economic Research Center could not function in the same way afterward and ceased its research for several years. In 2015, during a police raid, the computers and documents were seized. This raid was a part of a larger crackdown on NGOs in Azerbaijan. The acts of the authorities were challenged in courts, and it became a matter of a case at the ECtHR in which the court ruled that the bank accounts are to be reopened. The director of the ERC at the time, Gubad Ibadoghlu, later left the country to continue his work in exile.

In July 2023, the office of the Economic Research Center was raided by the police again, this time in connection to Gubad Ibadoghlu's arrest; documents and computers were seized during the search, and the office itself was sealed.

== Research ==
Before the crackdown and freezing of the accounts, the ERC focused on monitoring and scrutinizing the government's spending, the budget, and policies.

Since 2018, the ERC restarted publishing its reports and monitoring data, such as its report on the Azerbaijani government's mine removal efforts in Karabakh that shows that prime agricultural land in the region was seized by Aliyev's family and his closest allies. The other report from 2019 has presented the data that shows the cotton industry in Azerbaijan using child labor, forcing students into working, and committing other labor and human rights violations.
