= Institute for Social and Economic Analyses =

Czech think tank

- Director: PhDr. Simona Weidnerová, MBA
- Address: Novotného lávka 200/5, 110 00; Prague 1, Czech Republic
- Coordinates: 50°5′39.15″N 14°20′30.48″E
- Interactive map of Institute for Social and Economic Analyses
- Website: isea.cz/

The Institute for Social and Economic Analyses (ISEA, Czech: Institut pro sociální a ekonomické analýzy) is a Prague-based think tank established in 2002. Its members' research covers subjects related mainly to the recent social and economic transformation of the Czech Republic. These include education, competitiveness, public finance, pension system reform, income inequality, tax issues of research and development, political systems and political corruption.

The policy institute's motto is Diagnosis and Dialogue while the institute claims to strive to achieve a consensus among experts and the Czech political representation. The institute has been actively involved in lobbying the Czech Parliament regarding tax issues related to European Union funds available for research.

ISEA has obtained grants mainly from the Open Society Fund in Prague, the Czech government via the Czech Science Foundation and from other sources such as Konrad Adenauer Stiftung. The institute is associated with the Global Development Network. In 2007, the institute founder, sociologist Petr Matějů, was named a Fulbright New Century Scholar.

== Books ==
- Matějů, Petr, Ondřej Schneider a Jiří Večerník (eds.). Proč tak těžko? Praha: Institut pro ekonomické a sociální analýzy, 2003. ISBN 80-903316-0-2
- Matějů, Petr a Jana Straková (eds.). Vyšší vzdělání jen pro elitu? Rozsah a zdroje nerovností v přístupu k vyššímu vzdělání v České republice. Praha: Institut pro ekonomické a sociální analýzy, 2003. ISBN 80-903316-1-0
- Matějů, Petr a Jana Straková (eds.). Na cestě ke znalostní společnosti. Kde jsme--? Kritická analýza současné situace. Vol. 1. Praha: Institut pro ekonomické a sociální analýzy, 2005. ISBN 80-903316-2-9
- Smith, Michael L. Občané v politice: studie k participativní a přímé demokracii ve střední Evropě. Praha: Institut pro sociální a ekonomické studie, 2009. ISBN 978-80-903316-5-5
- Smith, Michael L. Přímá demokracie v praxi: Politika místních referend v České republice. Praha: Institut pro sociální a ekonomické studie, 2007. ISBN 978-80-7330-117-0
- Smith, Michael L (ed.). Vnímání a realita korupce: Nové výzkumy, metody a postupy. Praha: Institut pro sociální a ekonomické studie, 2009. ISBN 978-80-903316-4-8

== See also ==
- List of think tanks
