= The Economic Information and Education Center =

South Korean think tank

- Abbreviation: EIEC
- Formation: 1991
- Type: Think Tank
- Headquarters: 47 Hoegiro, Dongdaemun-gu, Seoul 130-740, Korea
- Location: Seoul
- Executive Director: Il-dong, Koh
- Website: http://epic.kdi.re.kr/eiec_eng/main/main.jsp

- The Economic Information and Education Center
- Hangul: KDI경제정보센터
- RR: KDI gyeongje jeongbo senteo
- MR: KDI kyŏngje chŏngbo sent'ŏ

The Economic Information and Education Center (EIEC) is an affiliated organization of Korea Development Institute (KDI), a leading think tank of Korea. EIEC aims to enhance the public understanding of economy by providing accurate economic information, publishing economic policy-related periodicals, hosting workshops and training programs, developing and distributing economic educational materials, and conducting public-opinion surveys on economic issues.

== History ==
KDI was founded in March 1971. Following integration with the National Institute for Economic System and Information, the Center for Economic Education was established in 1991 as a subordinate entity of KDI. In 1998, the Center for Economic Education was renamed as the Economic Information and Education Center(EIEC).

== Organization ==
EIEC is headed by an executive director whose position is currently held by Dr. Koh Il-dong, a senior research fellow and economist at the KDI. EIEC consists of two divisions: the Division of Economic Information and the Division of Economic Education.

- Division of Economic Information The main responsibility of the Division of Economic Information is to collect, process, and disseminate various economy-related information. The division publishes monthly economic policy magazines both in Korean and English, reviews latest news from domestic and international mass media, and surveys and analyzes the views of opinion leaders and the general public.
- Division of Economic Education The Division of Economic Education conducts various types of activities such as economics camps for students, economics seminars for school teachers, scholastic competitions relating to economics for high school students, and conferences on national and global economic issues for government officials. It also develops and distributes various educational contents and teaching-learning materials in order to promote a higher level of economic education.

== Publications ==
EIEC publishes various economic policy-related journals including monthly Narakyungje, an exclusive economic policy magazine in Korea, and Economic Bulletin, an English-written magazine which focuses on the Korean economy. EIEC also publishes study materials such as Click! Economic Education, a monthly publication that provides summaries and commentaries on economy-related curricula and current economic affairs.
