= Contraditório think tank =

Organization in Lisbon, Portugal

Contraditório Think Tank
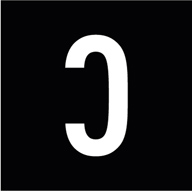
- Formation: 2008; 18 years ago
- Headquarters: Lisbon, Portugal
- Website: contraditorio.pt

Contraditório think tank is headquartered in Lisbon, Portugal. It was founded in 2008 by Luís Faria, its president, and Matilde Monteiro Pais, vice-president. Contraditório is a freestanding, nonprofit, nonpartisan and nongovernmental think-and-do tank.

Contraditório Think Tank advocates both personal and economic liberty: free minds, free markets and the effectiveness of individual responsibility.

== Principles ==
Contraditório defends each person’s right to liberty and property. Contraditório agrees with the ideas of rule of law, representative government and limits on power, private property and the free market, and tolerance. Contraditório advocates that individuals should have the freedom to live their life in any peaceful chosen way and to realize their full potential, considering the prohibition to use force against others except in defence and honoring and respecting the peaceful choices and the equal rights of others.

Contraditório advocates that all human relationships should be voluntary and that the scope of government must be limited and its major function must be to protect people's freedom: to preserve law and order, to enforce private contracts and to foster competitive markets.

The key principles of Contraditório’s philosophy include the following:

Individualism: Individualism rests on the idea that the individual is the relevant unit of social analysis. Contraditório emphasizes the dignity of each individual, which entails both rights and responsibility. It is a misunderstanding, in scientific and ethical grounds, to think that individualism involves in any sense an egoistic system of values. Egoism is inconsistent both with the idea that individuals are ends in themselves and the defense of individual rights.

Individual rights: The principle of individual rights defends that persons exist as ends in themselves, they are not mere resources for others to use. The use of force, coercion or fraud may not be initiated against individuals and individuals have a natural right to be secure in their life, liberty and property. These rights are not granted by government or by society.

The rule of law: The rule of law serves to protect the rights of individuals. Contraditório strives for a society of liberty under law, in which individuals are free to pursue their own projects so long as they respect the equal rights of others.

Spontaneous order: Contraditório believes that order in society arises spontaneously, out of the voluntary and cooperative actions of individuals who coordinate their actions with the actions of others in order to achieve their purposes, to survive and flourish.

Limited government: Contraditório stands for limited government, generally through a constitution enumerating and limiting the powers that the people delegate to government. Contraditório believes that rights and individuals should be protected from governments.

Free markets: The right to property entails the right to exchange property by mutual agreement. Free markets are the economic system of free individuals, and they are necessary to create wealth. To survive and to flourish, individuals need to engage in economic activity and individuals will be both freer and more prosperous if government intervention in people’s choices is minimized.

Merit: A freer world would be far more meritorious than the world of today. Hard work, more work, higher-quality work and more and cleverer ideas are all meritorious, and they all create value. Market is not perfect but market and merit work well together.

The virtue of production: Like in the past there was a reaction against those who lived off the productive labor of other people, Contraditório now stands for the right of productive people to keep the outcomes of their labor.

Natural harmony of interests: Interests among peaceful, productive people in a just society are harmonious and we serve ourselves best by serving others. Natural harmony of interests is predicated on the idea that individual interests in the long-run are harmonious insofar as acting in one’s own interest furthers the interests of the community.

Peace: Contraditório battles the blight of war that brings death and destruction, disrupts family and economic life, and it is the common enemy of peaceful and productive people.

== Activities ==
Contraditório publishes papers combining the evidence-based approach with the engagement in civic intervention. Contraditório's papers aim to stimulate the debate and to scrutinize ideas and policies.

Contraditório also promotes debates in which the opposition of arguments tend to the clarification of the discussion and to build a well informed opinion.

In its articles Contraditório gives the floor to its readers and invites personalities from different fields to participate in discussions and comment on the latest topics.

In January 2011 Contraditório has launched the "Free Market of Political Ideas", an innovative way of bringing together citizens and the political ideas that shape their lives. The Free Market of Political Ideas gives people the possibility to value and scrutinize the ideas of the most relevant debates, political parties and their candidates.

== Scholars ==
Contraditório tends to balance research and analysis on a wide range of policy issues and public outreach and as an academic-diversified think tank welcomes the heterogeneity of subjects based on an innovative approach of facing problems and looking for solutions. It has Working Groups on a broad range of public policy issues - Education and Culture, Economy and Finance, International Affairs and Political Science, Law, Science, Innovation and Technology, Entrepreneurship, Society - on which its members conduct policy research.
