= Taiwan Asia Exchange Foundation =

Taiwanese-based think tank on ASEAN

Taiwan-Asia Exchange Foundation 台灣亞洲交流基金會
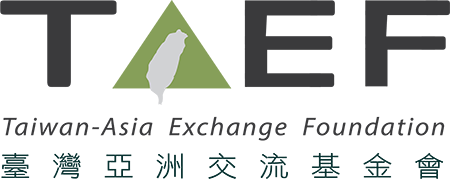
- Founded: 8 August 2018
- Type: Non-profit / Think Tank
- Headquarters: Taipei City, Taiwan
- Official language: Traditional Chinese & English
- Key people: Dr. Hsin-Huang Michael Hsiao (Chairman); Dr. Alan Hao Yang (Executive Director)
- Website: www.taef.org

Taiwan-Asia Exchange Foundation (Chinese: 財團法人臺灣亞洲交流基金會; Abbreviation: Taiya Foundation or TAEF, Chinese: 台亞基金會), established in 2018, is Taiwan's first private policy think tank focused on ASEAN and South Asia.

Established in Taiwan through the support of government, civil society and the private sector, the TAEF was given the mandate to help advance the people-centered agenda of Taiwan's New Southbound Policy, to act as the main organizing and administrative body of the Yushan Forum and serve as an exchange platform for leaders, youth representatives, NGOs and think tanks in the region. The TAEF works closely with counterparts from 18 NSP countries——the 10 ASEAN countries, 6 countries in South Asia, as well as Australia and New Zealand——through its five core programs: Taiwan-Asian Young Leader Engagement (TAYLE), Think Tank Collaboration, Cultural Exchange, Civil Society Connectivity and Regional Resilience.

In September 2018, the TAEF, together with the National Culture and Arts Foundation, The Prospect Foundation, Chung-Hua Institution for Economic Research, Taiwan External Trade Development Council, Taiwan Alliance in International Development (AID), and the Center for Southeast Asian Studies of the National Chengchi University, formed the Asia Engagement Consortium (AEC), a national platform of NGOs and think tanks all sharing the same ideals of connecting Taiwan with the world.

== Mission ==
- Organize the annual Yushan Forum and other multilateral dialogue platforms for regional stakeholders
- Serve as a pilot think and "do" tank for the New Southbound Policy initiatives while developing bilateral and multilateral in-depth research with regional think tanks
- Promote collaborative exchanges and partnerships, and consolidate a sense of regional community with Asian nations and other like-minded countries
- Facilitate international dialogues involving CSOs, young leaders and think tanks

== Funding ==
Initial funding for the establishment and operations of the Taiwan-Asia Exchange Foundation were seeded through the efforts of Taiwanese civil society and private enterprises.

== Merits ==
In its 2018 Global Go To Think Tank Index Report, the University of Pennsylvania named the Taiwan-Asia Exchange Foundation as one of the Best New Think Tanks of 2018, where it was listed as the youngest of 27 international think tanks having been founded only in August of the same year. It also marked the first time a Taiwan-based think tank made it to the category in the report since it was launched in 2008.

"The ranking represents recognition of the TAEF's work and its high level of global engagement, and it shows that the international think tank community has paid great attention to Taiwan's NSP and its external relations," said TAEF Executive Director Alan Yang.
