= Trinità dei Monti (think tank) =

Italian think tank

- Formation: 2012
- Type: Economic, foreign policy, financial think tank
- Location: Rome, Italy
- President.: Pierluigi Testa
- Website: trinitamonti.org

Trinità dei Monti is a think tank headquartered in Rome, Italy. Established by Pierluigi Testa and 50 other founding members in February 2012, it operates as a discussion group that gathers at the Spanish Steps in Rome. Trinità dei Monti focuses in economics, financial markets, banking, as well as Italian and European politics. Participants in the discussions comprise representatives from public authorities, banks, private companies, and universities.

== History ==
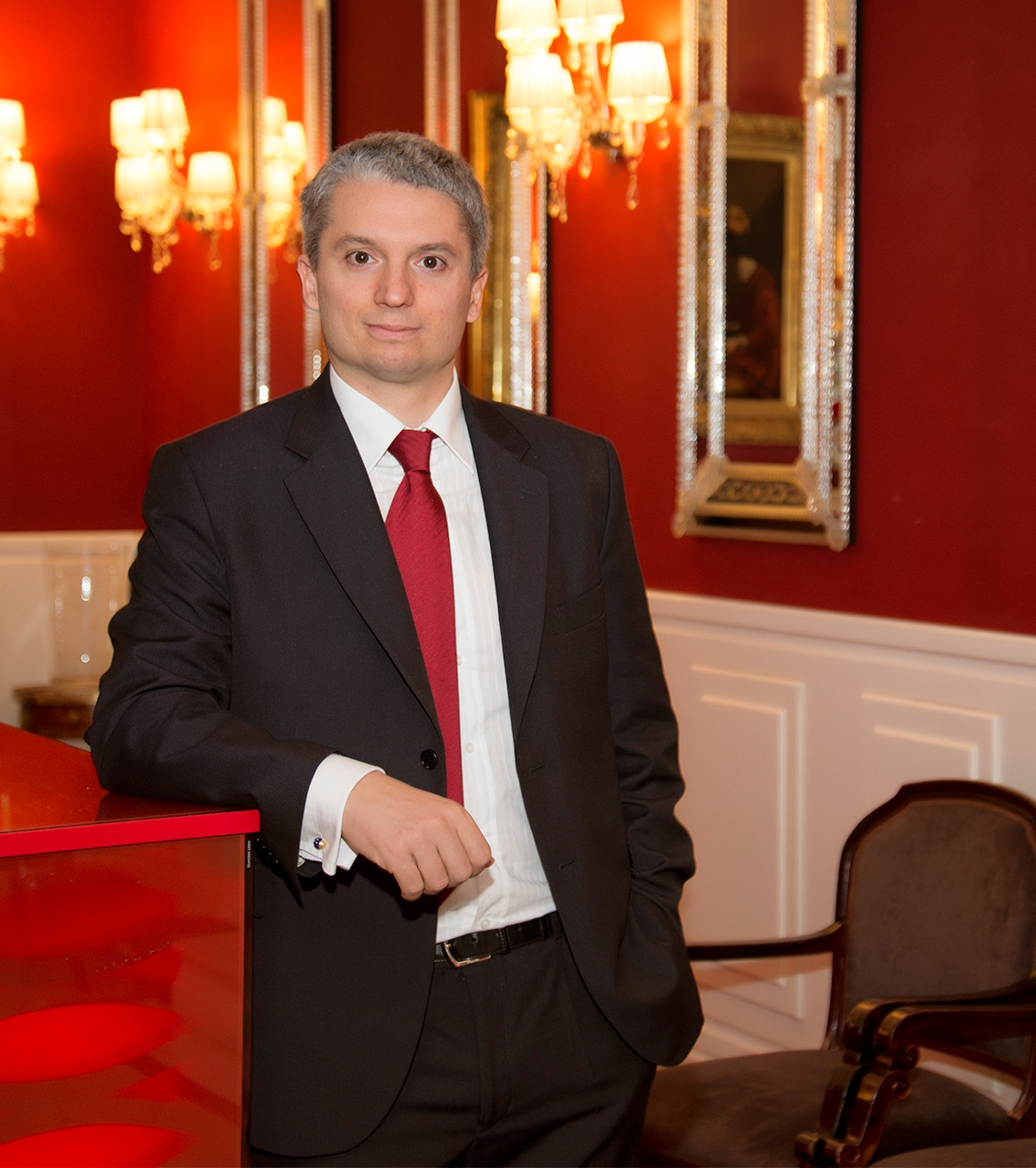
Pierluigi Testa, founder

Trinità dei Monti was established in 2012 by its current president Pierluigi Testa in Rome, Italy, and has since then been organizing meetings in collaboration with their partners. The think tank opened a satellite center in Naples in 2018. As of 2023, the group is composed of more than 400 members.

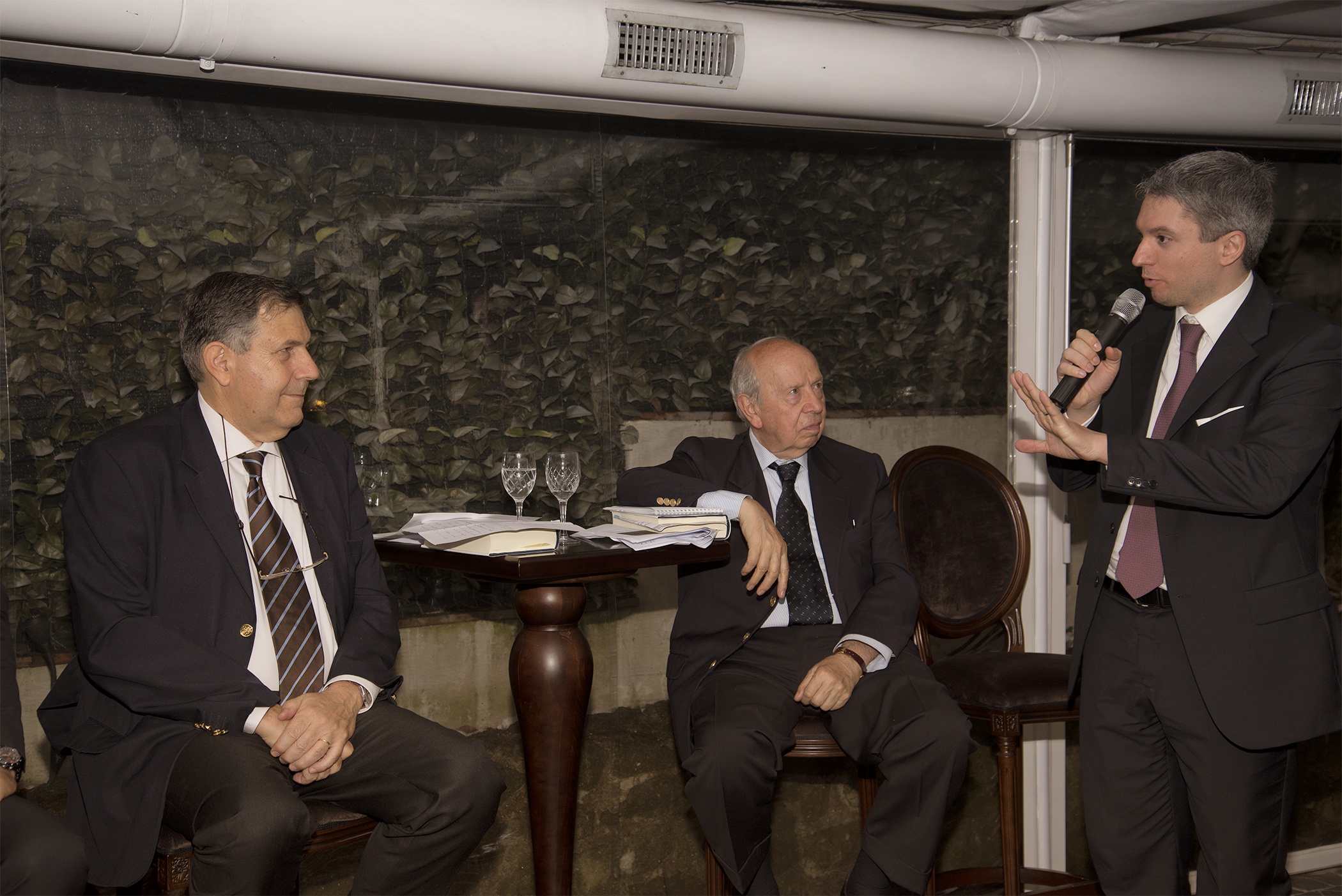
Pierluigi Testa with Lamberto Dini, and Giampaolo Galli

== Objectives ==
- Analysis and discussion covering a range of topics, including the economy, law, domestic and international politics, labour, banking, finance, and business. Regular meetings are held to create debates on issues directly relevant to both Italy and the European Union.
- Formulation and delivery of concrete proposals for the development of the economy and management of socio-economic policies to the Italian Government and to key industry stakeholders.
- Development of international relations and dialogue with governmental, industrial and academic entities. The think tank has established relationships with several foreign countries, including the United States of America, the United Kingdom, France, Switzerland, Poland, Georgia, and Hungary.
- Coaching young professionals and engaging them in institutional activities.
- Meeting female professionals regularly in the framework of meetings called ‘Womenomics’.
- Gaining an in-depth insight into certain issues relating to the political and economic history of Italy.

== Research ==
Research focuses on the following thematic areas:

- Economics and fiscal policy
- European Union politics
- Human rights and humanitarian crises
- Geopolitics (United States, Latin America, Asia, Africa)
- Mediterranean and Middle East (specifically Turkey)
- Security and defence
- Energy and climate
- Multilateralism and global governance (international political economy)
- Italy's foreign policy
- Technology, cybersecurity and AI
- International relations

The research staff is made up of approximately 30 researchers, including students from Universities in Continental Europe, such as the University of Kent, the London School of Economics, Sciences Po Lille, LUISS, University of Naples Federico II, University of Cambridge, University of Warwick Sapienza University of Rome, University of Helsinki and Bocconi University.

The think tank is a participant in international activities such as the Economic Forum in Krynica and the Pontignano Conference

== See also ==
- Think tanks in Italy
- List of think tanks
- Foreign relations of Italy
