= European Institute for Counter Terrorism and Conflict Prevention =

Austria-based think tank

The European Institute for Counter Terrorism and Conflict Prevention or EICTP is an Austria-based think tank founded by Herbert Scheibner, a politician from the right-wing populist Alliance for the Future of Austria, and Gustav Gustenau, a former Brigadier in the Austrian military who was removed from his position due to links with Jan Marsalek.

== Focus on political Islam ==
Founded in 2018, it is headed by former FPÖ Defense Minister Herbert Scheibner and maintains numerous connections and cooperations with the United Arab Emirates (UAE). The EICTP produces “actor analyses” on political Islam in Austria, profiling journalists and members of parliament suspected of supporting “political Islam”. Profil was unable to confirm reports that these “actor analyses” are forwarded to the UAE.

== Director ==
The director is retired colonel Ralph Thiele.
