= Centre for Fair Political Analysis =

Hungarian think tank

The Centre for Fair Political Analysis (CFPA; Méltányosság Politikaelemző Központ) is a Hungarian think tank. It studies social and political cohesion. It was founded in 2007. CFPA is independent and non party affiliated. CFPA's philosophy is built upon the "three Cs": conflict, consensus, and cohesion.

== Values ==
- The recognition of Hungary's international surroundings
- Comparative approach of surrounding countries
- Sensitivity towards historical continuity and change - CFPA conducts political analysis that tries to understand the events and connections of the present, from not current happenings and their relations to their antecedents.
- The study of the internal cohesion of democracies - The study of social cohesion was understudied by Western European liberal democracies. Since the emergence of democracy, Hungary was obliged to go without the democratic surplus (trust) which derives from the commitment of society towards democracy. There were neither resources nor commitment for the civic education of society compared to the "success story" of the West in the era of post 1945 welfare states.
- The study of political networks - Democracies based on parties, which populated by actors. However the task is not just to describe them one at a time, but also to uncover the interactions between them. Furthermore to study what they learn from their past and from each other.

== Research topics ==
The Centre provides the Web Opinion Index and studies cohesion, civic education, and contemporary comparative research.

== Public initiatives ==
CFPA organizes conferences, runs a book publication program, and carries out advocacy projects.

== Foreign media ==
- The New York Times
- The Budapest Times
- Budapester Zeitung
