= Afghanistan Institute of Peace =

Think tank in Kabul, Afghanistan

Afghanistan Institute of Peace (AFGIP) is an independent think-tank headquartered in Kabul, Afghanistan. A non-governmental organization (NGO) and a non-for-profit organization, it advocates for positive community change and peacebuilding initiatives in Afghanistan.

The institute works with local Afghan peace-builders and international partners to bring sustainable positive change in Afghan communities, particularly in the conflict zones. AFGIP has a nationwide local peace-builders team which works with international experts in a unique approach to build local capacity of community people and establish the foundation for positive community change initiatives. AFGIP works with the community people using community's available assets. AFGIP believes that scaling up the capacity of community people and the use of their available resources including human energy will lead to long-term stability and peace in these communities. They are conducting research studies to understand the roots and causes of conflict in conflict zones and simultaneously prepare a response strategy per district to react and to respond to the community level issues by using the early warning signs and data. Their mission is to promote positive community change initiatives and youth empowerment through the religious channels to bringing long-term peace in Afghanistan.

== History ==
AFGIP was officially registered with the Afghanistan Government as an NGO in 2015. However, the organization was heavily involved in peacebuilding initiatives long before this which was structured as a voluntary mechanism where a number of like-minded peacebuilders were working on peacebuilding activities. The founder and CEO of AFGIP, Mr. Yasar Ahmadzai, was featured and recognized for his peacebuilding efforts by different organizations, including the United States Institute of Peace (USIP) and the World Peace Center. In 2015, he was featured by USIP among the top 10 peace builders across the globe for the year 2015.

== Afghanistan Conflict and AFGIP ==
Over four decades of violent conflict have fundamentally destroyed trust in peacekeeping and has built dangerous alternatives for the Afghan people to survive. While it's not impossible, but also not easy, peace-building and peacekeeping can be built in Afghanistan. The question of how is contingent on how we preserve and build peace. The approach the AFGIP so far took has been focusing on youths and building youth peace ambassadors. They believe that youth extremism has become a serious challenge not only to the Afghan government but to the entire region and mainly to the families where these youths are coming from. To construct the efforts made in this regard by various stakeholder in the past, AFGIP is working on a bottom-up approach to raise awareness and conduct peace sensitization in the hot-spot communities. Looking back not undermining what has been achieved in regards to peace-building efforts in Afghanistan, the impact of what has been done is limited to the main cities where already peoples' access to information and resources are high. So, to encounter peace in the hotspots AFGIP focused on the conflict zones and this became a priority for them since they are formally established. While all the provinces, but particularly the South, East, and South-Western provinces of Afghanistan are the main target of the insurgents that drives the youths to extremism and became the hot-spots in last decade and so. AFGIP by intervening in these hot-spots through its violence prevention activities work with religious networks and through families to provide alternatives to the at-risk youths in these communities. Previous interventions to address and prevent youth extremism in these provinces have been relatively unsuccessful, due in part, to poor targeting and unrealistic assessment of the true underlying causes of youth extremism in these hot-spots. So to not repeat the same mistake, AFGIP took a bottom-up approach which adopts a multi-prong approach to address at-risk youths and tackle extremism in a different but practical lens. Their approach allows for a broader engagement which provides an opportunity to gradually transform the targeted hotspots into a peaceful environment where youth will actively play their roles to build long-term peace in their communities.

== Approach ==
Peace is the most important element in any community and where it is lacking, it creates moments of anxiety that stifles growth. Drive the force of the community, especially the youths, in the wrong directions and can contribute to unstable environments that threaten everything in that community. In particular AFGIP:

- Establish mechanisms and take preventative measure to work with at-risk youths
- Build trust and communication opportunities in the communities by squeezing the gaps that often mislead the youths and drove them to the insurgency
- Train and equip the community members to better communicate and address dispute issues with at-risk youths which will lead to positive change and long-term peace in the communities
