= Taihe Institute =

Chinese think tank

- 太和智库
- Formation: 2013; 13 years ago
- Dissolved: September 12, 2025; 11 months ago
- Type: Think tank
- Headquarters: Beijing, China
- Website: www.taiheinstitute.org

Taihe Institute
- Simplified Chinese: 太和智库
- Traditional Chinese: 太和智庫
Transcriptions
Standard Mandarin
- Hanyu Pinyin: Tàihé Zhìkù

Taihe Institute, otherwise known as Taihe or TI, was a Chinese think tank founded in 2013 in Beijing. It was disbanded as of September 12, 2025.

== Publications ==
Taihe produced TI Library (《太和文库》), a collection of its researchers' findings. Taihe also produces TI Observer, a monthly English publication, to which policy makers, diplomats, industry experts, and thought leaders are invited to share their insights on trending global issues. TI Observer vol. 21 (Non-Alignment 2.0) is referred by the American magazine Foreign Policy in its analysis of non-alignment theory.

In March 2019, "General Xue Lectures on Sun Tzu's Art of War," authored by Xue Guo'an, a senior fellow of the Taihe Institute, and the first book listed under the "Taihe Institute Book Series," was published by the state-owned CITIC Press Group. In September 2025, the think tank closed in what Lianhe Zaobao said was related to the political downfall of Gao Yichen, a former 610 Office official and former deputy minister of the Ministry of State Security.

=== COVID-19 disinformation ===
In August 2021, Taihe Institute, together with the Intelligence & Alliance Think Tank, published a report titled "U.S. Responsible for Global Spread of COVID-19."
