= Captus =

Independent Swedish think-tank

Captus is a conservative Swedish think-tank that was founded in Gothenburg in 2005. It regularly publish articles mainly in Swedish but also in international media such as The Guardian, Human Events, The Wall Street Journal, FrontPage Magazine and The American Enterprise. Captus also publishes reports on issues ranging from labour market regulations to integration policy, from waste and environmental management to Iranian energy subsidies.
