= TASC (think tank) =

Irish think tank

Think tank for Action on Social Change
- Abbreviation: TASC
- Formation: 2001
- Type: Public policy think tank
- Headquarters: 101 Baggot St. Lower, Dublin 2, Ireland
- Website: Official website

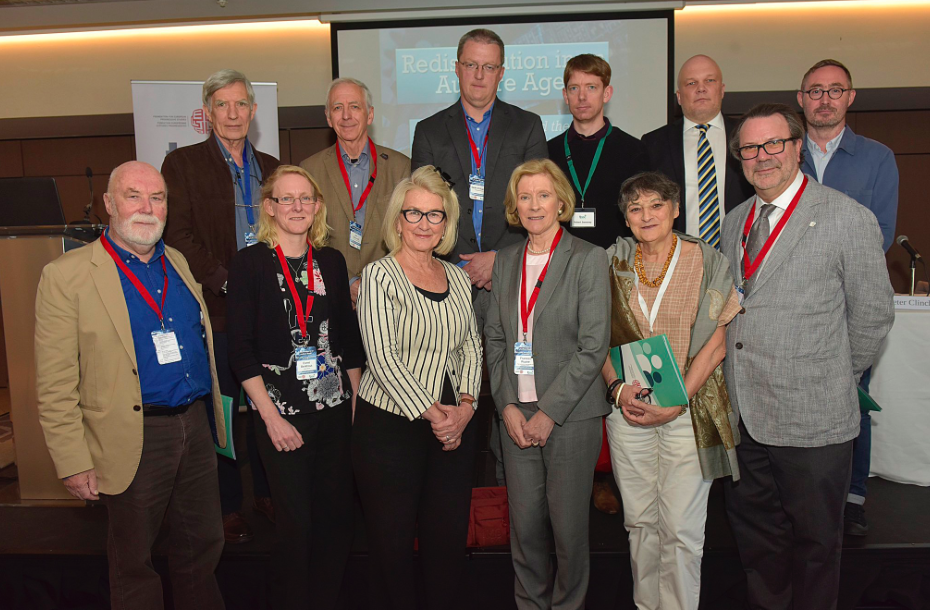
Speakers at the 2018 FEPS-TASC conference 'Redistribution in an Austere World'

TASC ("Think-tank for Action on Social Change") is a think-tank based in Dublin, Ireland. The organisation's outputs include an annual "Inequality Report"; research on tax, pay and working conditions in Ireland; and a "Toolkit for Open Government".

TASC hosts a number of events, including an annual conference which is held in association with the Brussels think tank, the Foundation for European Progressive Studies (FEPS). Former speakers at TASC events have included the social epidemiologist Richard Wilkinson.
