= Transatlantic Dialogue Center =

Ukrainian think tank

- Центр трансатлатичного діалогу
- Formation: 2021
- Founder: Maksym Skrypchenko; Yuliia Osmolovska
- Type: think tank
- Registration no.: 44554934
- Purpose: policy advice
- Location: Kyiv, Ukraine
- President: Maksym Skrypchenko
- Website: tdcenter.org

The Transatlantic Dialogue Center (TDC, Ukrainian: Центр трансатлатичного діалогу) is a Ukrainian non-governmental think tank that specializes in political analysis, project activities, and consulting in the field of foreign policy and communications.

== Activities ==
Since the beginning of the full-scale Russian invasion of Ukraine, the TDC has launched a campaign to inform foreign governments and NGOs about the situation in Ukraine. The center's analysts published dozens of articles and gave comments to the world's leading media. One of the priorities of the Transatlantic Dialogue Center's advocacy activities has also been the organization of study visits to Ukraine for foreign journalists, politicians, youth organizations and NGOs.

In March 2022, the Center prepared a booklet containing a list of damaged and destroyed cultural heritage sites in Ukraine, which began documenting Russia's crimes against world culture.

The organization was one of the signatories of an appeal from Ukrainian NGOs to the European Union to grant Ukraine the status of a candidate for EU membership.

Partnering with the Rating sociological group, TDC has been conducting nationwide surveys to measure Ukrainian's expectations of reconstruction as well as their perception of war, possible ways to achieve peace and durable security guarantees.

Starting from 2023, the organization is also engaged in the research related to the post-war reconstruction of Ukraine.
