= National Institute for Research Advancement =

Japanese think tank

The National Institute for Research Advancement (NIRA; Japanese: NIRA総合研究開発機構) is a Japanese independent policy research think tank based in Tokyo founded in 1974 under the National Institute for Research Advancement Act. It is funded through an endowment comprising capital contributions and donations from public and private sectors.

Its objective is to conduct independent research to contribute to the resolution of contemporary complex social issues in many areas, including politics, economics, international affairs, society, new technologies, and administration.

In addition to its research activities, NIRA also organizes various academic events, such as symposiums, workshops, and lectures.

It maintains a World Directory of Think Tanks.
