= Institute for International Monetary Affairs =

Japanese research institute

The Institute for International Monetary Affairs, or IIMA, is a Tokyo-based economic research institute which provides information and policy recommendations on financial and monetary issues.

The IIMA was formed in 1995. Its founder, and current president, is Toyoo Gyohten, the former Bank of Tokyo Chairman.
