= The Lion Rock Institute =

Free market think tank in Hong Kong

== History ==
The Institute was founded in August 2004 by founders Simon Lee, Andrew Work, and Andrew Shuen.

== Political stance ==
The Lion Rock Institution describes itself as "independent". Academic and democracy activist Joseph Cheng regards the Institution as politically neutral.

== Activities ==
The Lion Rock Institution's political activities have been pro-free market. It opposed to an increase of tobacco tax in Hong Kong as proposed by the Hong Kong Government in 2009.

The Lion Rock Institute is active in a range of aspects of Hong Kong society, especially broadcasting and telecom, town planning, transportation, house and redevelopment, fiscal management, competition law, social mobility, minimum wage, education, health care, and financial services. It does not concern itself with foreign policies or those concerning mainland China.

The Institute has been quoted on a number of these issues by newspapers and media outlets in Asia.

== Beliefs ==
The Lion Rock Institute subscribes to the view that "policies from a free market perspective", such as defending property rights, lessening government interferences on the market, and advocating low taxes rates and minimal restrictions on businesses, "will contribute to a freer and more prosperous future for Hong Kong".

== Symbolism ==
The Institute explains that "In the 1950s, hundreds of thousands fled turmoil in Mainland China. They hoped for freedom and a better life. They settled in droves on the slopes of Hong Kong's geographical centre, Lion Rock..."Under the Lion Rock", a 1970s classic by Roman Tam, tells the story of the people who built Hong Kong. The spirit of a community supported the individual efforts of those seeking freedom and prosperity." The Lion Rock name symbolises the strength of the people of Hong Kong, both during this time and in general; by taking on the name, the Institute hopes to express the "hope for freedom, individual courage" and an aspiration to build a prosperous future of the people of Hong Kong.

== Values ==
Among the Institute's values:

- Free market values as expressed by Adam Smith, Friedrich Hayek, Milton Friedman and others provide the strongest base for guiding successful government policy in Hong Kong.
- Truly independent research is an absolutely necessary part of the debate leading to intelligent policy.
- The people of Hong Kong have a right and the capability to be involved in the debate about the economic policy of today that will affect their future.

== See also ==
- Libertarianism
- List of think tanks in Hong Kong
