= Taiwan Competitiveness Forum =

Think tank in Taiwan

Taiwan Competitiveness Forum (TCF; Chinese: 台灣競爭力論壇; pinyin: Táiwān Jìngzhēnglì Lùntán) is a policy think tank in Taiwan led by academics supporting Chinese unification.

== History ==
The group was founded on August 15, 2007, by scholars who "worried about the deadlock situation of the cross-strait relationship [...] and draining competitive power in the country". The chairman of the group at the time was Pang Chien-kuo, a Kuomintang politician.

During the 2014 Taiwanese local elections, Taiwan Competitiveness Forum published an opinion poll about Ko Wen-je's MG149 controversy. The opinion poll, however, is heavily criticised for push poll:

針對柯文哲在臺大醫院私設帳戶並接受得標廠商捐款，臺大醫院院長在立法院公開表示這是違法的。在這件事情上，請問您相不相信柯文哲是清白的？
Ko Wen-je has established accounts in the NTUH without authorisation and received assistance from bid winners. In response to the incident, the director of the NTUH publicly stated at the Legislative Yuan that it was illegal. Do you believe that Ko Wen-je is innocent?

— Taiwan Competitiveness Forum, The third question of the opinion poll.

Liao Yu-Tseng (廖育嶒), master of political science at National Chengchi University, described the questions as "leading", indicated that they "cannot represent how voters truly think". The TCF poll showed that 40.1% believe that Ko Wen-je is innocent and 33.9% do not believe it; while TVBS was 47% vs 22% and The Storm Media was 68% vs 27%.

During the candidates' debate in the election, Peng Jin-peng (彭錦鵬), then chairman of the TCF, asked Ko Wen-je how can he be a mayor with an idea "exempt from the rule of law", while asked Lien Sheng-wen why he "risk his life" to elect the mayor and compared him to Michael Bloomberg. A group of students at National Taiwan University questioned Peng Jin-peng's behaviour, while Peng Jin-peng defended his behaviour.

== See also ==
- Politics of the Republic of China
