= Institute of Iran and Eurasia Studies =

Iranian non-governmental organization

The Iran Eurasia Research Institute, also known as the Institute of Iran Eurasian Research Institute (Iras), is an independent, private, non-partisan, non-governmental organization in Iran, Tehran. The organization aims to study Central Asia, the Caucuses, Russia, and Iran's Eastern neighbors. T

On its website, Iras regularly offers updates, analysis, and policy briefs pertaining to the region, or through the academic journals and Monographs it regularly publishes. Articles on the website are published in Persian, English, and Russian.
