= Doctors Reform Society of Australia =

Medical political organization in Australia

The Doctors Reform Society of Australia (DRS), established in 1973, is a medico-political thinktank and a medical association of medical practitioners and medical students that has advocated a range of alternative views to those of the Australian Medical Association.

Their initial focus was on universal health care or health insurance leading up to the establishment of the then "Medibank", now Medicare Australia. The DRS publishes the New Doctor journal.
