= Air Power Australia =

Australian research institute

- Founded: 2004 in Australia
- Founder: Carlo Kopp, Peter Goon
- Website: http://www.ausairpower.net

Air Power Australia is a private non-profit Australian think tank. It was formed by Dr Carlo Kopp and Peter Goon in October 2004. The stated primary aim of the organisation is 'air power research and analysis, especially in the context of a modern integrated joint national force structure.' Air Power Australia is not affiliated with the Department of Defence, the Australian Defence Force or any other Australian Commonwealth government organisation.

== Papers ==
The Air Power Australia website archives only a few articles and papers, about 350 dealing mostly with contemporary military aviation and Australian defense issues.

The Air Power Australia Analyses journal (ISSN 1832-2433) is also hosted by the website. Its stated aim is to provide a vehicle for academic and professional research, analysis and discussion articles and papers which do not fit the parameters of established publications in Australia. Most of the journal's publications to date are concentrated in the areas of policy, policy reform, strategy, technological strategy and basic technology.

== Industry Criticisms of APA Claims ==
Air Power Australia and Mr Peter Goon, in their 2016 Planned acquisition of the F-35 Lightning II (Joint Strike Fighter) report submissions; repeated their allegations that "the F-35's flight capabilities do not exceed those of the F-16 and F/A-18 and questioned whether this would adequately serve Australia's future needs", despite having been refuted at length by a number of fellow analysts, and called on to release the data/assumptions and the calculations used to make these claims.

Elements of Power refuted many of Mr Goon's early assertions in 2015, showing the F-35A "has "at least" the maneouvrability of a Block 50 F-16C.".
