= Western Australia Policy Forum =

Australian think tank

The Western Australia Policy Forum (WAPF) was a think tank based in Western Australia. It was independently funded and was established in 2007. It was the first think tank in Australia, which has a federal system of government, concerned solely with the issues of one particular State. It is no longer currently active.

WAPF papers and essays from its range of contributing authors were focused on those issues relevant to Western Australia. Its initial papers have been concerned with aviation, desalination and the State Budget. WAPF is also planning a 'WA 2025’ summit on policies for the future of Western Australia which will take place in November 2009, following the federal Australia 2020 Summit.

== Philosophy ==
Although WAPF was not definitively aligned with any political party in Western Australia it had a broadly progressive stance. WAPF aimed to “Develop and promote evidence-based analysis and policy conducive to a vision of Western Australia as a well-governed, mature, free, democratic, liberal, egalitarian, prosperous, ethical, sustainable, fair and just society within the Commonwealth of Australia”.

== Environmental Sub-group ==
The environmental sub-group is the first single-issue subgroup established within the WAPF. Other subgroups on issues relevant to State Government policy may be formed in the future.

== WAPF Directors ==
- David Ritter – Lawyer
- Julian Roche – Author and Consultant
- Raj Selvedra – Company Director

WAPF also has an Advisory Board composed of leading public figures from the State.
