= Center for Economic and Social Development =

Azerbaijan think tank

Center for Economic and Social Development, or CESD; in Azeri, İqtisadi və Sosial İnkişaf Mərkəzi (İSİM) is an Azeri think tank, non-profit organization, NGO based in Baku, Azerbaijan. The center was established in 2005.

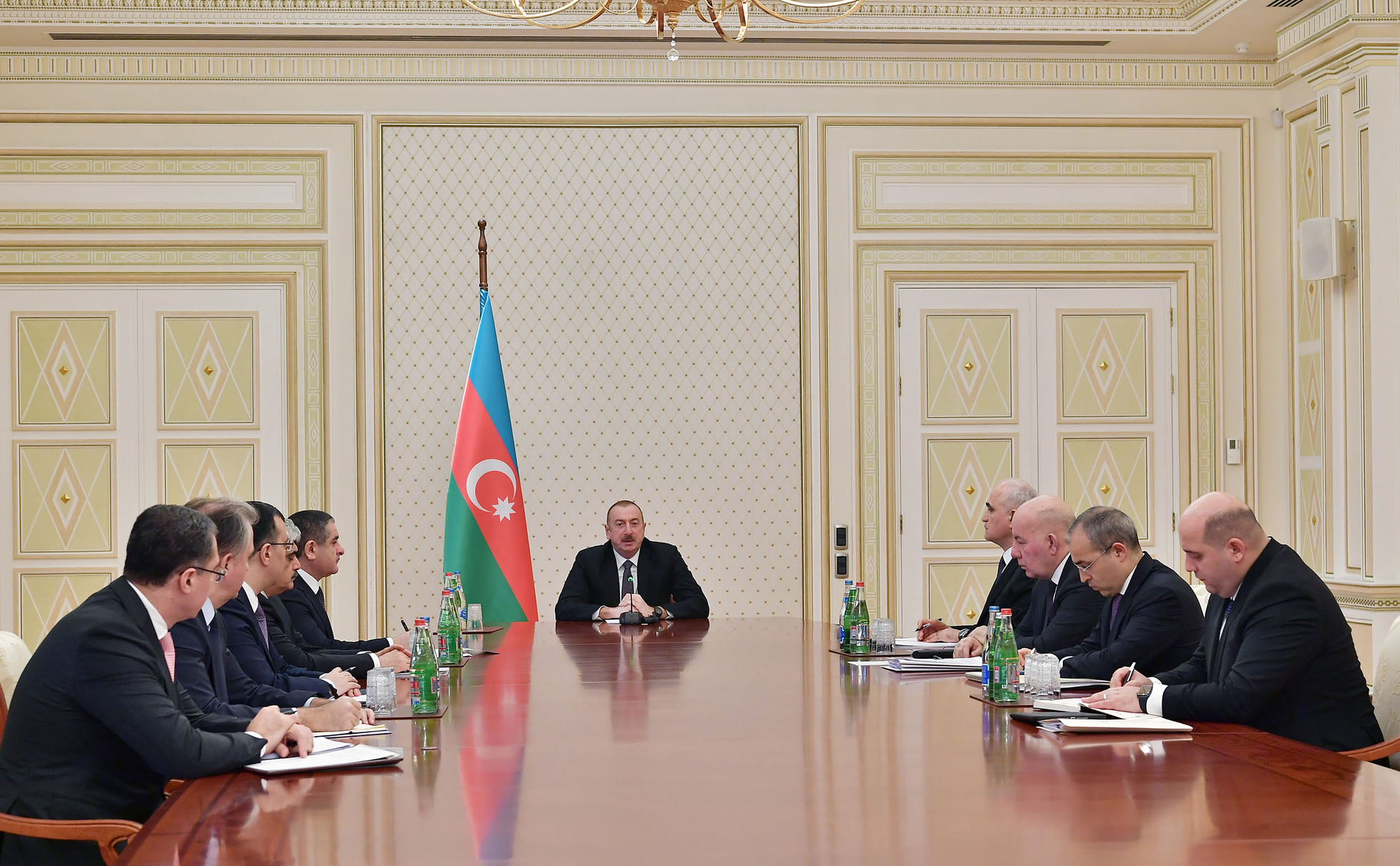
Meeting for Economic and Social issue

CESD focuses on policy advocacy and reform, and is involved with policy research and capacity building. CESD involves leading researchers prominent in their fields and enjoys a broad regional and international networking.

CESD ranked as one of the top think tanks in the world by The University of Pennsylvania, United States, in the Global "Go-To Think Tanks" Report in 2010. According to the University of Pennsylvania rankings - a result of surveys from 1500 scholars and peer review evaluation - the Center for Economic and Social Development (CESD) is one of the top 25 think tanks in Central and Eastern Europe, including CIS. CESD is the only think tank from the Caucasus and Central Asia included in the top think tanks rankings.

CESD is also ranked as one of the top 25 domestic economic policy think tanks in the world. Only CESD (ranked 19) and the Center for Social and Economic Research (CASE), (Poland, ranked 21) were included in the list from Central and Eastern Europe and CIS countries.

== Mission ==
CESD has been set up to promote research into domestic and regional economic and social issues, advocacy towards reforms, and capacity building for the purpose to positively impacting policymaking and improving participation.

== The focus ==
The center is a leading Azerbaijani think tank specialized in economic and social policy issues, working with and establishing bridges between the government and the various representatives of civil society. At the same time, the Center positions itself in the center of the civil society, having tight relationships with media, 24 communities spread around Azerbaijan, NGOs providing services at the grass-roots level, international think-tanks, financial institutions and donors, and virtually all the other think tanks functioning in Azerbaijan.

== Goals ==
- Policy advice and advocacy
- Government and civil society capacity development
- Public awareness, interest in involvement, and participation in policy programs and reforms
- Anticorruption reforms, mechanisms, programs, and tools at the policy and grassroots levels
- Understanding and application of market economy principles and values in Azerbaijan and the region
- Cooperation between educational institutions and public, private, and NGO sectors in addressing the economic and social issues
- Research and programs to address sustainable development, as well as the issues on women's rights protection, poverty reduction, Millennium Development Goals and economic and social reforms

== Management ==
The chairman of CESD is Vugar Bayramov, well-known economist in Azerbaijan. He has a Ph.D. in economics from Washington University in St. Louis. The center board consists of 5 economists and social-work specialists, and all of them are alumni from different US universities.

== Publications ==
- Ending Dependency: How Is Oil Revenues Effectively Used in Azerbaijan? (ISBN 978-9952-8131-0-4)
- Audit in Local Government (ISBN 978-9952-8131-1-1)
- Modern Economics
- Reforms in Public Administration; Policy Recommendation
- Health Economics
- Strategy of State Oil Fund (Policy Paper)
- Azerbaijan's Accession to the WTO (Policy Paper)
- Gender Economics; “Brain Lost” Problem in Azerbaijan (Policy Paper)
- Political Credibility; why investments go to the oil sector (Policy Paper)
- Why 90% of investments go to oil sector? (Policy Paper)
- Oil Revenues; Transparency, Effectiveness and Accountability (Policy Paper)
- Investment Strategy in Business Sector (Policy Paper)
- Social insurance in Azerbaijan: diagnostics and recommendations on policy and implementation (ISBN 978-9952-81-313-5)

== Membership ==
CESD is a member of PASOS, CIVICUS World Citizen’s Alliance, Global Development Network, NISPAcee, etc. and local partner of Global Integrity.
