= Foreign Policy Initiative BH =

Nongovernmental organization from Bosnia and Herzegovina

- Abbreviation: FPI BH, VPI BH
- Formation: 2004; 21 years ago
- Type: Nongovernmental institution, public policy think tank
- Location: Sarajevo, Bosnia and Herzegovina
- Executive director: Lejla Ramić-Mesihović
- Website: http://www.vpi.ba

Foreign Policy Initiative BH is nongovernmental, non-profit and independent policy research organization based in Sarajevo, Bosnia and Herzegovina. Foreign Policy Initiative conducts research of foreign policy, international relations and international obligations of Bosnia and Herzegovina. It was formed in 2004.

It is stated the organization's mission is "to serve the citizens of Bosnia and Herzegovina and its institutions through a wide range of research possibilities, publications and organization of event with the aim to raise awareness about the internal governance in Bosnia and Herzegovina as well as guidelines for foreign policy".

Foreign Policy Initiative states that "as a non-profit and nongovernmental organization it is committed to enhancing and influencing the debates with academia, activists and decision makers in Bosnia and Herzegovina. Apart from regular reports about the progress of Bosnia and Herzegovina's reform process, Foreign Policy Initiative tried to provide a critical opinion of the reform process by analysing political, economic and social questions."

== Activities ==
Foreign Policy Initiative BH implements projects in Bosnia and Herzegovina, in cooperation with local and regional partners. The focus of most of the projects is support the EU integration process and monitor the process itself. FPI also publishes political analyses which tackle most relevant foreign policy issues, reform process and progress of BiH towards the EU membership. Members and experts associated with FPI BH are authors or co-authors of analyses, research papers and publications about BiH's foreign policy, EU integrations and regional cooperation.

One of the main goals of the organization is "to widen the professionals' knowledge and skills so they would be enabled to tackle the challenges and instable nature of international relations and diplomacy." FPI BH organizes workshops and publishes publications in cooperation with students, researchers, makers of public policies so as to help in understanding the complexities of international relations and modern diplomacy.

== FPI BH Assembly ==
Assembly is the highest supervisory and decision-making body of the organization. The Assembly appoints the management, Advisory Board, selects external associates and grants new memberships. The members of Assembly are: Amer Kapetanović, Denisa Sarajlić, Davor Vuletić and Zoran-Matija Kulundžić.
