= Forum Minority Research Institute =

Slovak think tank

The Forum Minority Research Institute or Forum Institute (Fórum Kisebbségkutató Intézet or Fórum Intézet in Hungarian and Fórum inštitút pre výskum menšín or Fórum inštitút in Slovak) is a Slovak think tank with its main focus on ethnic minorities living in Slovakia, especially Hungarians. The NGO's scope of activities are the study and documenting of ethnic minorities, publishing these findings and the keeping of a database of historical documents and photographs. It also speaks out on government policy-making on a regular basis, especially when the policies affects the minorities in a negative way, which sometimes triggers criticism from Slovak nationalists.

== History ==
The institute was founded in 1996 by the Katedra Foundation and the Forum Foundation, in Dunajská Streda. In 1999, two partner institutes were founded: the Forum Information Centre provides civil training and civil service, while the Forum Regional Development Centre is engaged with rural development and small area planning. Together with the Forum Minority Research Institute, these three organizations form a consortium, the Forum Institute. In 2002, the Forum Institute moved to Šamorín, where it resides to this day. The president of the institute is political analyst László Öllös.
