= Centre of Policy and Legal Reform =

Ukrainian think tank

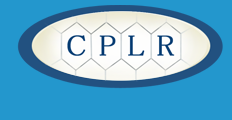
- Formation: 1996
- Type: think tank
- Head of the Board: Ihor Koliushko
- Website: pravo.org.ua%20www.pravo.org.ua

The Centre of Policy and Legal Reform (Ukrainian: Центр політико-правових реформ; Tsentr polityko-pravovykh reform) is a Ukrainian non-governmental think tank founded in 1996.

== Activity ==
The CPLR is promoting institutional organization of Ukraine as the state which ensures human rights and is responsible to the citizens. Although CPLR isn’t classical human rights organization, exactly the value of human rights defines the nature and purpose of the organization. CPLR elaborates and promotes implementing reforms in Ukraine in such areas:

- Constitutional order;
- Public administration
- Judiciary
- Criminal justice
- Combating corruption
- European integration

== The impact on the political and legal development ==
The work of CPLR has been implemented by other post-soviet countries alongside Ukraine. CPLR’s experience in the areas of administrative justice and administrative offences is being evaluated by international organizations such as OSCE/ODIHR and UNDP as worth to be shared with other post-soviet countries. CPLR experts have been involved in work on Code of Administrative Justice, Code of Administrative Offenses and Code of Administrative Procedures in Kazakhstan and Kyrgyzstan.
