= International Energy Centre =

Australian collaborative initiative

- Formation: 2011
- Type: Not For Profit
- Location: Brisbane
- Region served: Global
- CEO: Tim McLennan

The International Energy Centre (IEC) is a collaborative initiative established by three of Australia's leading universities (University of Western Australia, University of Newcastle and University of Queensland), and foundation industry member Glencore Xstrata. IEC's vision is to create an established centre of excellence in thought leadership, postgraduate education and innovation management to support the transition to a sustainable low carbon world.

The Centre formed in 2011, with foundation sponsorship funding from Xstrata Coal, a subsidiary of Xstrata,(now Glencore Xstrata). The business model is based on the experience of the formation of the International Water Centre, a joint venture between University of Western Australia, University of Queensland (two of the three universities in the IEC) plus Griffith University and Monash University. Recently Glencore awarded scholarships to six Master of Energy Studies students.
