= Prospect Foundation =

Taiwanese think tank

The Prospect Foundation (Chinese: 遠景基金會) is a government-affiliated think tank based in Taiwan, established in 1997, which aims to analyze the relations across the Taiwan Strait, international politics and economy, and provide suggestions of policies for the Taiwanese government. There are about a dozen of research fellows in the foundation who research and analyze the development of international and cross-strait relations.

The Prospect Foundation ranks 94th in the Top Think Tanks in Southeast Asia and the Pacific of Global Go To Think Tank Index 2017 report published by Think Tanks and Civil Societies Program.

== History ==
The Prospect Foundation is affiliated with the Taiwanese government.

Former Minister of Foreign Affairs, Dr. Tan-sun (Mark) Chen (traditional Chinese: 陳唐山) has served as the chairman since August 10, 2016, I-chung Lai (traditional Chinese: 賴怡忠) serves as the president and Tin-huey Lin (traditional Chinese: 林廷輝) serves as the vice president.

The Prospect Foundation invited former U.S. Secretary of State Mike Pompeo to deliver a speech on March 4, 2022. Reporting of Pompeo's pay varied, with $150,000 being the most commonly reported figure. In his speech, Pompeo called on the United States to recognize the Republic of China as an independent and sovereign country.

On 7 April 2023, the foundation was sanctioned by the Chinese government as a "diehard "Taiwan independence" separatist" organizationfor supporting Taiwanese independence.

== Publications ==
The Prospect Foundation periodically publishes Prospect Journal in English and Prospect Foundation Quarterly in traditional Chinese.

== Research focus ==
- New Southbound Policy convergence with Free and Open Indo-Pacific strategy of the United States
- The Yushan Forum Asia Dialogue for Innovation and Progress hosted by the Prospect Foundation is the Taiwanese government's New Southbound Policy discussion panel. The chairman of the Prospect Foundation, former Minister of Foreign Affairs Dr. Tan-sun (Mark) Chen, has stated that the focuses of New Southbound Policy are on trade, agriculture, education, scientific research in medicine and technology with ASEAN and South Asian countries.

== Global participation ==
- The Taiwan–ASEAN Dialogue, cohosted by the Prospect Foundation, Indonesian think tank The Indonesian Council on World Affairs and The Habibie Centre in Taipei, attended by about 200 former and current parliamentarians, diplomats and scholars from Taiwan and ASEAN, including Singapore's Trade Representative Mr. Simon Wong and Taiwanese President Tsai Ing-wen.
- Prospect Foundation members hold discussions with think tank Institute for Defence Studies and Analyses, in India, on India–China relations, India–Taiwan relations and India–Japan relations.
- The 2017 Taiwan–US–Japan Trilateral Security Dialogue was cohosted by the Prospect Foundation with The Heritage Foundation from the United States and The Sasakawa Peace Foundation from Japan.
- The Asia–Pacific Security Dialogue is hosted by the Prospect Foundation. President Tsai Ing-wen of Taiwan made the opening address. Former Secretary of Defense and Vice President of United States Richard B. Cheney discussed the pros and cons of the New Southbound Policy.
- In an address during the Yushan Forum–Asian Dialogue for Innovation and Progress, former Vice President of the Philippines Jejomar Binay commented on the Prospect Foundation's research and development programs on healthcare cooperation between Taiwan and the Philippines.
- The Prospect Foundation paid a visit to the Office of International Affairs, Thammasat University in Thailand on New Southbound Policy cooperation.
