= Global Governance Institute =

Brussels-based think tank

Global Governance Institute (GGI)
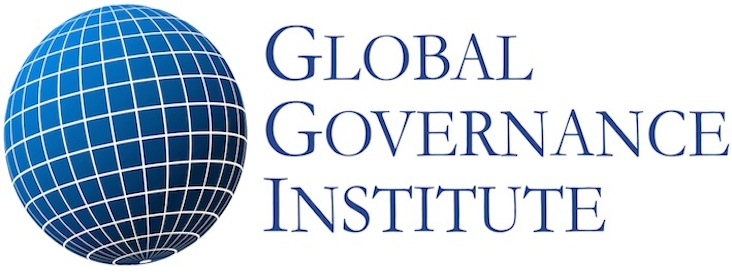
- Motto: "Research, education and advice for tackling Global Challenges"
- Established: 2010
- Focus: Global Governance; Peace & Security; Global Justice & Human Rights; Global Economic Governance; Global Environmental Governance; Global Education and Innovation; AI and Global Governance
- Chair: Joachim Koops
- Head: Silviu Piros (Managing Director)
- Key people: Benedikt Franke (Member of the Board) Christof Tatschl (Member of the Board) Silke Rusch (UN / GGI Senior Expert, Peace & Security) Steve Utterwulghe (UNDP / GGI Senior Expert, Global Economy) Alexandra Novosseloff (GGI Senior Expert Peace & Security) Andreas Goldthau (Erfurt University / GGI Senior Expert, Global Economy) Christopher Lamont (AI and Global Governance Programme) David Timis (AI and Global Governance Programme)
- Address: Cours Saint Michel 30A
- Location: Brussels, Belgium
- Website: www.globalgovernance.eu

The Global Governance Institute (GGI) is an independent, international non-profit think tank based in Brussels. It was founded in 2010 and brings together senior policy-makers, scholars and practitioners in order to devise, strengthen and improve forward-looking approaches to global governance through research, education and policy advice.

GGI's vision is a more equitable, peaceful and sustainable global order based on effective and accountable international organizations, the global rule of law and the empowerment of the individual across borders and cultures. GGI places particular emphasis on the impact of the United Nations system and its mutual reinforcement with strong regional organizations, civil society and progressive coalitions of member states. GGI is the only think tank in Brussels that predominantly focuses its work on the United Nations system and examines cross-border challenges from a global governance perspective. Next to its research, education and policy advice activities, it also runs a Global Governance Traineeship scheme for young and talented undergraduate and graduate students, supported by the European Union's Erasmus+ programme.

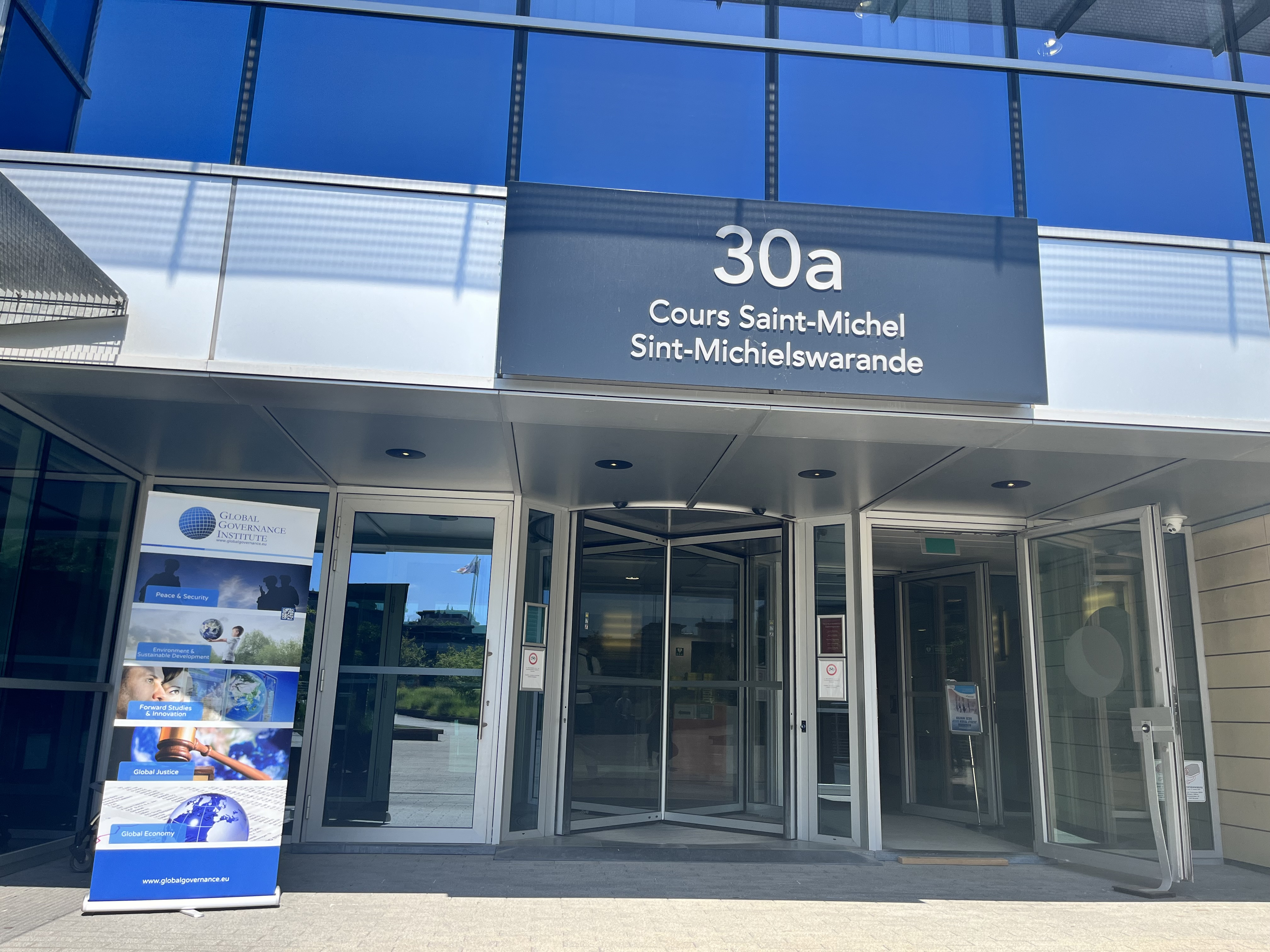
Office of the Global Governance Institute in Brussels

The Global Governance Institute also serves as the Secretariat for the European Network on Teaching Excellence (E-NOTE), based at GGI's Global Education & Innovation Unit and as the Brussels hub for the European University for Well-Being (EUniWell).

== History and organisation ==
GGI was founded in 2010 by the international security scholar Joachim Koops, Christof Tatschl (former chief of staff of the Standby High-Readiness Brigade for UN Operations), Benedikt Franke (CEO of the Munich Security Conference) and Aaron Leopold (sustainable development expert). It is a not-for-profit non-governmental organisation (ASBL/VZW) under Belgian law. The objective of GGI's creation was to launch in the Brussels-based policy-maker environment an independent research, education and policy think tank entirely dedicated to the issues of global governance with the United Nations system at its core. Particular emphasis has been placed on how global challenges could be addressed more effectively and inclusively by member states, civil society and regional organisations in the spirit of the 1995 Report on Global Governance by the Commission on Global Governance. GGI received its initial funding from the Department for International Development of the United Kingdom and focused in particular on the intersection of sustainable development, human rights and peace. Initial projects explored ramifications of "land grab" and land property rights in developing countries as well as on wider issues of global governance from an "emerging powers" perspective.

Much of GGI's work has also focused on how the European Union and United Nations can cooperate to address major global governance challenges, particularly in the field of peace and security, international criminal justice and crisis management. In 2015, GGI co-organized the only Europe-wide consultation of the United Nations High-Level Independent Panel on Peace Operations (HIPPO) and ran various projects on EU–UN cooperation in peacebuilding. In more recent years, GGI's initiatives in research, education and policy advice included projects on regional approaches to UN peace operations, strengthening urban resilience at the local-global policy nexus, conflict prevention and mediation, the protection of civilians as well as the global governance of artificial intelligence.

GGI currently has a full-time managing team and more than 40 resident and non-resident fellows based in Brussels as well as across four different continents, working on policy-oriented research, education and training and policy advice in core areas of global governance in the fields of

- Peace and security (with a particular emphasis on United Nations peace operations and peacebuilding)
- Global justice and human rights (including international humanitarian law and the protection of civilians)
- Global environmental governance
- Global economy
- Education and innovation in a global context
- The global governance of artificial intelligence
- European and global implications of Russia's war against Ukraine (the Ukraine Programme)

GGI's board of directors consists of:

- Joachim Koops (chair)
- Silviu Piros (managing director)
- Benedikt Franke
- Christof Tatschl
- Hendrik Geleyte

== Research and policy advice projects ==
GGI conducts a wide range of externally funded or self-funded research and policy advice projects on transnational global governance challenges, including issues related to higher education from a European and Global perspective. Funding bodies include the European Commission (under FP7, Erasmus+), the European External Action Service, the European Parliament, the German Ministry of Defence, the French Ministry of Defence, the Global Challenges Foundation and the Heinrich Boell Foundation. The institute does not receive any structural subsidy by any organisation or government.

== Education and training ==
GGI's mission also includes the provision of training and education on core issues of global governance as well as trainings on European and Global dimensions of Education itself. The institute cooperates with a variety of universities, such as the European University for Well-being (EUniWell), the Belgian Royal Military Academy, University of Warwick (UK), Georgetown University in Washington D.C., John Cabot University in Rome and Linnaeus University in Sweden. GGI is a founding partner of the European Network on Teaching Excellence (E-NOTE) and serves as its Secretariat, advancing trainings for higher education teachers, staff and managers on how to advance evidence-based excellent teaching. Additional education-focused projects and initiatives include the 'Leadership and Institutionalization for Teaching Excellence' (LITE) project and 'EU-Ukrainian Cooperation for Academic Resilience (EU-CARE)'. GGI also runs, in cooperation with the Belgian Royal Military Academy, a 10-day intensive summer school on global peace, security and strategic studies as well as a one-week summer school on artificial intelligence and global governance. The institute also focuses on traineeship programmes for young undergraduate and graduate students via its Global Governance Traineeship programme.

== Workshops and events ==
The institute organises regular workshops and events to increase awareness and engagement with experts and the wider public about core global governance challenges and potential solutions. These events are either self-funded by the institute or part of externally funded research or education projects. Often events are co-organized with higher education institutions, civil society organisations or regional and international organisations.

== Publications ==
GGI regularly publishes open-access analyses (full-length in-depth studies), briefing papers and policy advice reports.

== Podcast "State of the Globe" (SOTG) ==
GGI hosts the "State of the Globe" podcast, which examines core global challenges and governance solutions across the domains of peace and security, democracy and human rights, environmental governance, the Global Governance of Artificial Intelligence and global economic governance.
