= Center for Policy Studies in Ukraine =

Ukrainian think tank

The Center for Policy Studies in Ukraine (Ukrainian: Центр дослідження політики в Україні, romanized: Tsentr doslidzhennia polityky v Ukraini) is a non-governmental think tank in Ukraine, headquartered in Lviv. The Center deals with international politics, civil society, NGOs, education, politics, regional policy and legislature; it also conducts conferences and seminars. The Center for Policy Studies was established in 1994 and officially registered in 1997. One of its key objectives is to utilize the creative potential of the graduates and students of social sciences and humanities at Lviv University and other universities in Lviv and the region to promote democratic principles and civil society in Ukraine. The center works to assist the development of a network of teaching staff and innovative educational areas, and to implement activities aimed at developing professional, independent media to document the changing political environment of Ukraine.

== Millennium Center ==
The Millennium Center focuses on attracting international and domestic experience in political analysis to assist in the study of political processes in Ukraine and Galicia and the civic-political culture of different strata of society. It also works to establish cooperation between public, political and scientific (academic and non-government) institutions in the region and foster inter-regional cooperation in political science.

== Task Center ==
The Task Center focuses on the systematic study of public opinion on a wide range of political issues. It conducts research on issues of power, the political party structure of Ukrainian society, inter-ethnic relations, national security and the prospects of Ukraine's integration into the world community. It holds scientific conferences and organizes and conducts seminars and schools for students and youth. The center fosters the ongoing exchange of information between Ukrainian research institutions and the world, and performs expert and analytical support of the media and government structures. The center also publishes works in the fields of political science and the humanities.

== Activities ==
The center conducts surveys on socio-political problems of Ukraine and publishes the results to the media every two months. These results include a definition of the ratings and influence the activities of leaders, politicians, managers, businessmen, financiers, artists and journalists in the Lviv region. They also include a postal survey, a "Person of the Year", a campaign for "Man of the Year – Galician Knight", election exit polls and other official surveys to prevent fraud. The center also provides radio announcements of election results. It conducted surveys during the national referendum of April 16, 2000. The center runs six schools, dividing their focus among civic leadership, press, policy, art, voting and democracy. It also conducts scientific studies of the institutionalization of state power and party structure of Ukrainian politics, and analyzes and predicts key trends in the political process of Ukraine.

The center's educational programs are supported by the Canadian Bureau of the International Education Center, which participated in a project entitled "Development of civil society in Ukraine". This involved the development and implementation of the educational process with a seven-course curriculum in public-sector management (five of which have been implemented):

- Community development
- Strategic and operational planning
- Financial management
- Communications management
- Conflict
- Leadership
- Public relations

The center implemented a project entitled "Implementation of the LNU curriculum", which provides instruction for students of social sciences and the humanities at Lviv University and other universities in the region in theory and analysis of sociopolitical processes in present-day Ukraine.

The Center publishes a bimonthly newsletter, Politeks, and also publishes the results of its research in handbooks and leaflets. The center has published the following books:

- The Political Process in Ukraine: Collected Works – Lviv, 1998
- Skochylyas, L. Parliament of Ukraine: Political Conduct of Parliamentary Factions of the 13th Verkhovna Rada of Ukraine – Lviv, 1999
- Central European Initiative Directory – Lviv, 1999.
- Romaniuk, A. Western Europe Political Directory: Science – Lviv, 1999
- Crisis In Kosovo – Lviv, 1999
- Electoral Arithmetic: Analytical Results Of Presidential Elections in Ukraine – Lviv, 1999
- A. Romaniuk and L. Skochylyas, Ukraine and Central Europe: Challenges and Integration. Proceedings of the International Scientific Conference – Lviv, 1999
- A. Romaniuk, Presidential Elections in Russia: Who's Who in Political Science – Lviv, 2000
- Presidents of the World (Directory) – Lviv, 2000
- A. Romaniuk, Who's Who in the Region: a Biographical Directory – Lviv, 2000
- L. Skochylyas, Dynamics of Local Political Parties in Lviv and Donetsk: Comparative aspects (1994–1999) – Lviv, 2000

== Electronic communication ==
Internet activity (to develop communications for the media and the public sector) is an important part of the center's activities. In addition to operating its own website, its specialists provide free services for the development, deployment and administration of web pages for community organizations and regional media. The center has developed and administered the website of the Genesis social-humanitarian consortium, the Lviv daily Progress and helped fill an online library network of civic education in Ukraine (UCEN). Another online project is a full-text electronic community humanities library with domestic and foreign works. The library contains a literature section, compiled with the assistance of LNU.

== Clients ==
Clients of the center include its staff, who obtain professional experience; authorities and local governments, who receive recommendations regarding the organization of current events and research publications concerning public opinion in the regional media network and the internet; media, political parties, NGOs, partners, donor organizations, businesses and local governments.

== See also ==
- Ukrainian Center for EU Civil Service Standards – public institution established by the Cabinet of Ministers of Ukraine to facilitate administrative reform in Ukraine and enhance the adaptation of the civil service to the standards of the European Union
