= Korea Development Institute =

South Korean government research agency

Coordinates: 37.5950°N 127.0428°E

- Type: Government-run
- Established: 1971
- Affiliations: Prime Minister's Office
- President: Se Jik Kim
- Location: Korea Development Institute, 15 (Bangok-dong, Korea Development Institute), Giljae-gil, Sejong-si 339-007, Korea, Sejong City, South Korea
- Website: www.kdi.re.kr

- Korea Development Institute
- Hangul: 한국개발연구원
- Hanja: 韓國開發硏究院
- RR: Hanguk gaebal yeonguwon
- MR: Han'guk kaebal yŏn'guwŏn

The Korea Development Institute (KDI; Korean: 한국개발연구원) is a Korean government agency established in 1971 to conduct policy research. KDI has conducted research on a broad range of economic and social issues, including macroeconomic policy, fiscal policy, and labor.

== Timeline ==
- 31 December 1970: Promulgation of Act establishing KDI (Law No.2247)
- 11 March 1971: Establishment of KDI
- 1982: Installation and operation of the International Development Exchange Program (IDEP)
- 6 May 1982: Opening of the Korea Economic Institute (KEI) Washington D.C. Office in US
- 15 November 1990: Launching of the North Korean Economic Research Center
- 27 December 1991: Establishment of the Center for Economic Information
- 9 March 1994: Launching of the Center for Legal and Economic Research
- 5 December 1995: Act on KDI amended establishing KDI Graduate School (No.5047)
- 5 December 1997: Opening of the KDI School of International Studies
- 18 September 1998: 'Center for Economic Education', changed to 'Center for Economic Information and Education,' and moved to KDI
- 6 November 1999: 'KDI School of International Studies' changed to 'KDI School of Public Policy & Management'
- 6 January 2000: Establishment of the Public and Private Infrastructure Investment Management Center (PIMAC)
- 27 January 2005: Integration of Private Infrastructure Investment Center of Korea (PICKO) with KDI to launch the Public and Private Infrastructure Investment Management Center (PIMAC)
- 11 September 2009: Establishment of Center for International Development (CID)
- 30 December 2012: Relocation to Sejong completed
- 1 June 2014: Establishment of the Center for Regulatory Studies
- 22 December 2014: KDI School of Public Policy and Management's relocation to Sejong completed

== Major research activities ==
- 1970s: "First Research Report: Opinion of the Corporate Liquidation", "Basic Plan for the Establishment of the 4th Five-Year Economic Development Plan", "A Study of Revised Agendas for the 5th Five-Year Economic Development Plan", "A Study of Relevant Agendas for the 6th Five-Year Economic and Social Development Plan", "The Economic and Social Modernization of the Republic of Korea", "Growth and Structural Transformation", "The Developmental Role of the Foreign Sector and Aid", "Public Finances During the Korean Modernization Process", "Financial Development in Korea", "Government, Business, and Entrepreneurship in Economic Development: The Korean Case", "Education and Development in Korea", "Economic Development, Population Policy, and Demographic Transition in the Republic of Korea", "Urbanization and Urban Problems", "Rural Development", "The Korean Economic 'Miracle' Yesterday, Today and Tomorrow", "Sources of Economic Growth in Korea", "Long-term Economic and Social Development, 1977-91", "Policy Documents on Economic Stabilization Measures (I)", "Policy Documents on Economic Stabilization Measures (II)", "Measure for Overcoming Economic Crisis", "Market Structure and Regulation of Monopolies and Oligopolies"
- 1980s: "Improving the Management System of Government-invested Enterprises", "State of Tariff Policy and Ideas for Improvement", "Basic Issues in Industrial Policy and Ideas for Revising Support Measures", "National Pension Scheme: Basic Framework and Socioeconomic Impact"
- 1990s: "Basic Vision for Developing Inter-Korean Economic Relations", "Implementation of the Real-Name Financial Transaction System", "Assessing the Impact of Instituting the Real-Name Financial Transaction System", "Major Points for Consideration in the Adoption of a Real-Name Financial Transaction System", "50 Years of Korean Economic Development: Assessment and Prospects for the 21st Century", "Comprehensive Measures to Overcome Economic Crisis and Promote Structural Reform"
- 2000s: "Vision 2011: Open Society, Flexible Economy", "A Study on Improving the Management of Government-Controlled Institution", "Introducing the Medium-term Expenditure Framework", "Population Aging in Korea: Policy Issues and Reform Agenda (I)", "Population Aging in Korea: Policy Issues and Reform Agenda (II)", "Socio-Economic Impacts of Population Aging and Policy Issues (I)", "Socio-Economic Impacts of Population Aging and Policy Issues (II)", "The Comprehensive Study Toward Developing a Post-Retirement Income Security System (I)", "The Comprehensive Study Toward Developing a Post-Retirement Income Security System (II)", "Policy Task to Improve Service Industry Productivity", "Service Industry Targeting and Development of Performance Indicators", "Policy Agenda for Improving the Service Sector"
- 2010s: "Restructuring the Korean Economy in the Post-crisis Era: Modernization of the Service Industry", 'Economic Growth in Low Income Countries: How the G20 Can Help to Raise and Sustain it", "G20 The Seoul Summit", "Toward the Consolidation of the G20", "Global Leadership in Transition", "Post Crisis Growth and Development", "In Search of New Paradigm in Housing Policy after the Global Financial Crisis(Volume I and II)", "Structural Changes and New Policy Directions(Volume I and II), "Paradigm Shift for the Virtuous Cycle of Growth and Employment(Volume I and II)"
