= Think tank =

Organization that performs policy research and advocacy

A think tank (or public policy institute) is an organization that performs research and advocacy concerning topics such as social policy, political strategy, economics, military, technology, and culture. Most think tanks are non-governmental organizations, but some are semi-autonomous agencies within a government, and some are associated with particular political parties, businesses, or the military. Think tanks are often funded by individual donations, with many also accepting government grants.

Think tanks publish articles and studies, and sometimes draft legislation on particular matters of policy or society. This information is then used by governments, businesses, media organizations, social movements, or other interest groups. Think tanks range from those associated with highly academic or scholarly activities to those that are overtly ideological and pushing for particular policies, with a wide range among them in terms of the quality of their research. Later generations of think tanks have tended to be more ideologically oriented.

Modern think tanks began as a phenomenon in the United Kingdom in the 19th and early 20th centuries, with most of the rest being established in other English-speaking countries. Before 1945, they focused on the economic issues associated with industrialization and urbanization. During the Cold War, many more American and other Western think tanks were established, which often guided government Cold War policy. Since 1991, more think tanks have been established in non-Western parts of the world. Over half of all think tanks that exist today were established after 1980. As of October 2025, it is said that there are about 6,500 think tanks globally.

== History ==
According to historian Jacob Soll, while the term "think tank" is modern, with its origin "traced to the humanist academies and scholarly networks of the 16th and 17th centuries," evidence shows that, "in Europe, the origins of think tanks go back to the 800s when emperors and kings began arguing with the Catholic Church about taxes. A tradition of hiring teams of independent lawyers to advise monarchs about their financial and political prerogatives against the church spans from Charlemagne all the way to the 17th century, when the kings of France were still arguing about whether they had the right to appoint bishops and receive a cut of their income."

Soll cites as an early example the Académie des frères Dupuy, created in Paris around 1620 by the brothers Pierre and Jacques Dupuy and also known after 1635 as the cabinet des frères Dupuy. The Club de l'Entresol, active in Paris between 1723 and 1731, was another prominent example of an early independent think tank focusing on public policy and current affairs, especially economics and foreign affairs.

=== 19th century ===
Several major current think tanks were founded in the 19th century. The Royal United Services Institute was founded in 1831 in London, and the Fabian Society in 1884.

=== 20th century ===
The oldest United States–based think tank, the Carnegie Endowment for International Peace, was founded in Washington, D.C., in 1910 by philanthropist Andrew Carnegie. Carnegie charged trustees to use the fund to "hasten the abolition of international war, the foulest blot upon our civilization." The Brookings Institution was founded shortly thereafter in 1916 by Robert S. Brookings and was conceived as a bipartisan "research center modeled on academic institutions and focused on addressing the questions of the federal government."

After 1945, the number of policy institutes increased, with many small new ones forming to address Cold War geopolitics and post-war reconstruction, aiming to express various issues and policy agendas. Until the 1940s, most think tanks were known only by the name of the institution. During the Second World War, think tanks were often referred to as "brain boxes".

Before the 1950s, the phrase "think tank" did not refer to organizations. From its first appearances in the 1890s up to the 1950s, the phrase was most commonly used in American English to colloquially refer to the braincase or especially in a pejorative context to the human brain itself when commenting on an individual's failings (in the sense that something was wrong with that person's "think tank"). Around 1958, the first organization to be regularly described in published writings as "the Think Tank" (note the title case and the use of the definite article) was the Center for Advanced Study in the Behavioral Sciences. However, the Center does not count itself as and is not perceived to be a think tank in the contemporary sense. During the 1960s, the phrase "think tank" was attached more broadly to meetings of experts, electronic computers, and independent military planning organizations. The prototype and most prominent example of the third category was the RAND Corporation, which was founded in 1946 as an offshoot of Douglas Aircraft and became an independent corporation in 1948. In the 1970s, the phrase became more specifically defined in terms of RAND and others. During the 1980s and 1990s, the phrase evolved again to arrive at its broader contemporary meaning of an independent public policy research institute.

For most of the 20th century, such institutes were found primarily in the United States, along with much smaller numbers in Canada, the United Kingdom, and Western Europe. Although think tanks had also existed in Japan for some time, they generally lacked independence, having close associations with government ministries or corporations. There has been a veritable proliferation of "think tanks" around the world that began during the 1980s as a result of globalization, the end of the Cold War, and the emergence of transnational problems. Two-thirds of all the think tanks that exist today were established after 1970 and more than half were established since 1980.

The effect of globalisation on the proliferation of think tanks is most evident in regions such as Africa, Eastern Europe, Central Asia, and parts of Southeast Asia, where there was a concerted effort by other countries to assist in the creation of independent public policy research organizations. A survey performed by the Foreign Policy Research Institute's Think Tanks and Civil Societies Program underscores the significance of this effort and documents the fact that most of the think tanks in these regions have been established since 1992.

=== 21st century ===
As of 2014, there were more than 11,000 of these institutions worldwide. Many of the more established think tanks, created during the Cold War, are focused on international affairs, security studies, and foreign policy.

The median think tank publishes 138 articles a year, albeit there is substantial variation, with the Brookings Institution having published 3,880 reports in 2020 alone. Other prolific publishers include the Wilson Center or the CSIS.

== Types ==
Think tanks vary by ideological perspectives, sources of funding, topical emphasis and prospective consumers. Funding may also represent who or what the institution wants to influence; in the United States, for example, "Some donors want to influence votes in Congress or shape public opinion, others want to position themselves or the experts they fund for future government jobs, while others want to push specific areas of research or education."

McGann distinguishes think tanks based on independence, source of funding and affiliation, grouping think tanks into autonomous and independent, quasi-independent, government affiliated, quasi-governmental, university affiliated, political-party affiliated or corporate.

A new trend, resulting from globalization, is collaboration between policy institutes in different countries. For instance, the Carnegie Endowment for International Peace operates offices in Washington, D.C., Beijing, Beirut, Brussels and formerly in Moscow, where it was closed in April 2022.

The Think Tanks and Civil Societies Program (TTCSP) at the University of Pennsylvania, led by James McGann, annually rated policy institutes worldwide through 2021 in a number of categories and presented its findings in the Global Go-To Think Tanks rating index. However, this method of the study and assessment of policy institutes has been criticized by researchers such as Enrique Mendizabal and Goran Buldioski, Director of the Think Tank Fund, assisted by the Open Society Institute. As the TTCSP ended its operations in 2021, the platform ThinkTankAlert started ranking think tanks globally based on their inter-citation patterns in 2025.

== Activities ==
Think tanks may attempt to broadly inform the public by holding conferences to discuss issues which they may broadcast; encouraging scholars to give public lectures, testifying before committees of governmental bodies; publishing and widely distributing books, magazines, newsletters or journals; creating mailing lists to distribute new publications; and engaging in social media.

Think tanks may privately influence policy by having their members accept bureaucratic positions, having members serve on political advisory boards, inviting policy-makers to events, allowing individuals to work at the think tank; employing former policy-makers; or preparing studies for policy makers.

== Governmental theory ==
The role of think tanks has been conceptualized through the lens of social theory. German political scientist Dieter Plehwe argues that think tanks function as knowledge actors within a network of relationships with other knowledge actors. Such relationships include citing academics in publications or employing them on advisory boards, as well as relationships with media, political groups and corporate funders. They argue that these links allow for the construction of a discourse coalition with a common aim, citing the example of deregulation of trucking, airlines, and telecommunications in the 1970s. Plehwe argues that this deregulation represented a discourse coalition between the Ford Motor Company, FedEx, neo-liberal economists, the Brookings Institution and the American Enterprise Institute.

Elite theory considers how an "elite" influences the actions of think tanks and potentially bypasses the political process, analysing the social background and values of those who work in think tanks. Pautz criticizes this viewpoint because there is in practice a variety of viewpoints in think tanks and argues it dismisses the influence that ideas can have.

== Advocacy ==
In some cases, corporate interests, military interests and political groups have found it useful to create policy institutes, advocacy organizations, and think tanks. For example, The Advancement of Sound Science Coalition was formed in the mid-1990s to dispute research finding an association between second-hand smoke and cancer. Military contractors may spend a portion of their tender on funding pro-war think tanks. According to an internal memorandum from Philip Morris Companies referring to the United States Environmental Protection Agency (EPA), "The credibility of the EPA is defeatable, but not on the basis of ETS [environmental tobacco smoke] alone,... It must be part of a larger mosaic that concentrates all the EPA's enemies against it at one time."

According to the progressive media watchdog Fairness & Accuracy in Reporting, both left-wing and right-wing policy institutes are often quoted and rarely identified as such. The result is that think tank "experts" are sometimes depicted as neutral sources without any ideological predispositions when, in fact, they represent a particular perspective. In the United States, think tank publications on education are subjected to expert review by the National Education Policy Center's "Think Twice" think tank review project.

A 2014 New York Times report asserted that foreign governments buy influence at many United States think tanks. According to the article: "More than a dozen prominent Washington research groups have received tens of millions of dollars from foreign governments in recent years while pushing United States government officials to adopt policies that often reflect the donors' priorities."

== Global think tanks ==
=== African think tanks ===
==== Ghana ====
Ghana's first president, Kwame Nkrumah, set up various state-supported think tanks in the 1960s. By the 1990s, a variety of policy research centers sprang up in Africa set up by academics who sought to influence public policy in Ghana.

One such think tank was The Institute of Economic Affairs, Ghana, which was founded in 1989 when the country was ruled by the Provisional National Defence Council. The IEA undertakes and publishes research on a range of economic and governance issues confronting Ghana and Sub-Saharan Africa. It has also been involved in bringing political parties together to engage in dialogue. In particular it has organised Presidential debates every election year since the Ghanaian presidential election, 1996.

Notable think tanks in Ghana include:

- IMANI Centre for Policy and Education
- The Institute of Economic Affairs, Ghana (IEA)

==== Somalia ====
- Heritage Institute for Policy Studies
- Puntland Development Research Center

==== South Africa ====
- Electoral Institute for Sustainable Democracy in Africa
- Free Market Foundation
- FW de Klerk Foundation
- Helen Suzman Foundation
- Institute for Democratic Alternatives in South Africa (IDASA)
- Institute for Justice and Reconciliation
- Institute for Security Studies
- South African Institute of International Affairs (SAIIA)
- South African Institute of Race Relations

=== Asian think tanks ===
==== Afghanistan ====
Afghanistan has a number of think tanks that are in the form of governmental, non-governmental, and corporate organizations.

- Afghanistan Analysts Network
- Centre for Conflict and Peace Studies

==== Bangladesh ====
Bangladesh has a number of think tanks that are in the form of governmental, non-governmental, and corporate organizations.

- Bangladesh Institute of Development Studies (BIDS)
- Bangladesh Institute of Law and International Affairs (BILIA)
- Bangladesh Institute of Peace and Security Studies (BIPSS)
- Centre for Policy Dialogue (CPD)
- International Growth Centre (IGC)
- Making Our Economy Right (MOER)
- Bangladesh Institute of Labour Studies (BILS)

==== China ====
In China a number of think tanks are sponsored by governmental agencies such as Development Research Center of the State Council, but still retain sufficient non-official status to be able to propose and debate ideas more freely. In January 2012, the first non-official think tank in mainland China, South Non-Governmental Think-Tank, was established in the Guangdong province. In 2009 the China Center for International Economic Exchanges was founded.

===== Hong Kong =====
In Hong Kong, early think tanks established in the late 1980s and early 1990s focused on political development, including the first direct Legislative Council members election in 1991 and the political framework of "One Country, Two Systems", manifested in the Sino-British Joint Declaration. After the transfer of sovereignty to China in 1997, more think tanks were established by various groups of intellectuals and professionals. They have various missions and objectives including promoting civic education; undertaking research on economic, social and political policies; and promoting "public understanding of and participation in the political, economic, and social development of the Hong Kong Special Administrative Region".

Think tanks in Hong Kong include:

- Bauhinia Foundation Research Centre
- Business and Professionals Federation of Hong Kong
- Central Policy Unit
- Civic Exchange
- The Global Institute for Tomorrow
- HKGolden50
- Hong Kong Christian Industrial Committee
- Hong Kong Democratic Foundation
- Hong Kong People's Council on Housing Policy
- The Lion Rock Institute
- New Century Forum
- Our Hong Kong Foundation
- One Country Two Systems Research Institute
- Path of Democracy
- Policy Innovation and Co-ordination Unit
- Professional Commons

==== India ====
India has the world's second-largest number of think tanks. Most are based in New Delhi, and a few are government-sponsored. There are few think tanks that promote environmentally responsible and climate resilient ideas like Centre for Science and Environment, Centre for Policy Research and World Resources Institute. There are other prominent think tanks like Observer Research Foundation, Tillotoma Foundation, and Centre for Civil Society.

In Mumbai, Strategic Foresight Group is a global think tank that works on issues such as water diplomacy, peace and conflict and foresight (futures studies). Think tanks with a development focus include those like the National Centre for Cold-chain Development ('NCCD'), which serve to bring an inclusive policy change by supporting the Planning Commission and related government bodies with industry-specific inputs – in this case, set up at the behest of the government to direct cold chain development. Some think tanks have a fixed set of focus areas and they work towards finding out policy solutions to social problems in the respective areas.

Initiatives such as National e-Governance Plan (to automate administrative processes) and National Knowledge Network (NKN) (for data and resource sharing amongst education and research institutions), if implemented properly, should help improve the quality of work done by think tanks.

Some notable think tanks in India include:

- Association for Democratic Reforms (ADR)
- Centre for Civil Society (CCS)
- Centre for Development Studies (CDS)
- Centre for Dialogue and Reconciliation (CDR)
- Centre for Land Warfare Studies (CLAWS)
- Centre for Policy Research (CPR)
- Centre for Public Policy Research (CPPR)
- Central Institute for Cotton Research (CICR)
- Council On Energy, Environment and Water (CEEW)
- Edward & Cynthia Institute of Public Health (ECIPH)
- Forum of Free Enterprise (FFE)
- Foundation for Democratic Reforms (FDR)
- Indian Council of World Affairs (ICWA)
- Indian Institute of Corporate Affairs (IICA)
- Institute for Social and Economic Change (ISEC)
- Nabakrushna Choudhury Centre for Development Studies (NCDS)
- National Council of Applied Economic Research (NCAER)
- National Institute of Advanced Studies (NIAS)
- Observer Research Foundation (ORF)
- Public Affairs Centre (PAC)
- The Energy and Resources Institute (TERI)
- Vivekananda International Foundation (VIF)
- Wildlife Institute of India (WII)

==== Indonesia ====
- Centre for Strategic and International Studies
- Setara Institute

==== Iraq ====
Over 50 think tanks have emerged in Iraq, particularly in the Kurdistan Region. Iraq's leading think tank is the Middle East Research Institute (MERI), based in Erbil. MERI is an independent non-governmental policy research organization, established in 2014 and publishes in English, Kurdish, and Arabic. It was listed in the global ranking by the United States's Lauder Institute of the University of Pennsylvania as 46th in the Middle East.

==== Israel ====
There are many think tank teams in Israel, including:

- Shaharit – Creating Common Cause
- Jerusalem Institute for Market Studies (JIMS)
- Reut Institute
- Israel Council on Foreign Relations
- The Jerusalem Center for Public Affairs
- Adva Center
- Israel Democracy Institute
- Jerusalem Institute for Policy Research
- Myers-JDC-Brookdale Institute
- Floersheimer Studies at the Hebrew University of Jerusalem
- Harry S. Truman Research Institute for the Advancement of Peace, The Hebrew University of Jerusalem
- International Institute for Counter-Terrorism – IDC Herziliya
- Israel Center for Third Sector Research, Ben Gurion University of the Negev
- IPCRI – Israel/Palestine Center for Research and Information
- The Milken Institute
- Moshe Dayan Center for Middle Eastern and African Studies, Tel Aviv University
- The Begin-Sadat Center – Bar Ilan University
- The Center for the Study of Philanthropy in Israel at the Hebrew University of Jerusalem
- Israel Institute for Advanced Studies at the Hebrew University of Jerusalem
- The Jewish Arab Center (JAC), University of Haifa
- The Jewish People Policy Institute (JPPI)
- The Shalem Center
- Institute for National Security Studies, affiliated with Tel Aviv University.

==== South Korea ====
In South Korea, think tanks are prolific and influential and are a government go-to. Many policy research organisations in Korea focus on economy and most research is done in public think tanks. There is a strong emphasis on the knowledge-based economy and, according to one respondent, think tank research is generally considered high quality.

- Korea Development Institute
- National Assembly Budget Office
- The Asan Institute for Policy Studies
- Samsung Economic Research Institute
- Center for Free Enterprise
- Korea International Trade Association
- The Yeouido Institute
- The Economic Information and Education Center
- Jeju Peace Institute
- Korea Institute for International Economic Policy
- Korea Institute of Public Administration
- Sejong Institute

==== Japan ====
Japan has over 100 think tanks, most of which cover not only policy research but also economy, technology and so on. Some are government related, but most of the think tanks are sponsored by the private sector.

- Asian Development Bank Institute
- Central Research Institute of Electric Power Industry
- Genron NPO
- Global Industrial and Social Progress Research Institute
- Institute for International Monetary Affairs
- Institute of Developing Economies
- The International Academic Forum
- Japan Center for International Exchange
- Japan Institute for National Fundamentals
- Japan Institute of International Affairs
- Mitsubishi Research Institute
- National Institute for Research Advancement
- Rousoukai
- Shōwa Kenkyūkai
- Tokyo Foundation

==== Kazakhstan ====
Institute of World Economics and Politics (IWEP) at the Foundation of the First President of the Republic of Kazakhstan was created in 2003. IWEP activities aimed at research problems of the world economy, international relations, geopolitics, security, integration and Eurasia, as well as the study of the First President of the Republic of Kazakhstan and its contribution to the establishment and strengthening of Kazakhstan as an independent state, the development of international cooperation and the promotion of peace and stability.

The Kazakhstan Institute for Strategic Studies under the President of the RK (KazISS) was established by the Decree of the President of RK on 16 June 1993. Since its foundation the main mission of the Kazakhstan Institute for Strategic Studies under the President of the Republic of Kazakhstan, as a national think tank, is to maintain analytical and research support for the President of Kazakhstan.

==== Malaysia ====
Most Malaysian think tanks are related either to the government or a political party. Historically they focused on defense, politics and policy. However, in recent years, think tanks that focus on international trade, economics, and social sciences have also been founded.

Notable think tanks in Malaysia include:

- Academy of Sciences Malaysia (ASM)
- Institute for Democracy and Economic Affairs (IDEAS)
- Institute for Pioneering of Education and Economic Excellence (INSPIRE)
- Jeffrey Cheah Institute on Southeast Asia (JCI)
- Malaysian Industry-Government Group for High Technology (MIGHT)

==== Pakistan ====
Pakistan's think tanks mainly revolve around social policy, internal politics, foreign security issues, and regional geo-politics. Most of these are centered on the capital, Islamabad. One such think tank is the Sustainable Development Policy Institute (SDPI), which focuses on policy advocacy and research particularly in the area of environment and social development.

Another policy research institute based in Islamabad is the Institute of Social and Policy Sciences (I-SAPS) which works in the fields of education, health, disaster risk reduction, governance, conflict and stabilization. Since 2007 – 2008, I-SAPS has been analyzing public expenditure of federal and provincial governments.

==== Philippines ====
Think tanks in the Philippines could be generally categorized in terms of their linkages with the national government. Several were set up by the Philippine government for the specific purpose of providing research input into the policy-making process.

==== Russia ====
- Valdai Discussion Club
- Izborsky Club

==== Saudi Arabia ====
- Gulf Research Center
- King Abdullah Petroleum Studies and Research Center

==== Sri Lanka ====
Sri Lanka has a number of think tanks that are in the form of governmental, non-governmental and corporate organizations.

- The Lakshman Kadirgamar Institute of International Relations and Strategic Studies is a policy-studies institute that is often referred to as a think tank.
- LIRNEasia is a think tank working across the Asia-Pacific on regulatory and policy issues. Their main focus is the ICT sector, although they do work in other sectors, such as agriculture and health, which can benefit from ICT.
- Verité Research is an interdisciplinary think tank in Colombo.

==== Singapore ====
There are several think tanks in Singapore that advise the government on various policies and as well as private ones for corporations within the region. Many of them are hosted within the local public educational institutions.

Among them are the Singapore Institute of International Affairs (SIIA), Institute of Southeast Asian Studies (ISEAS), and the S. Rajaratnam School of International Studies.

==== Taiwan ====
In 2017 Taiwan had 58 think tanks. As in most countries there is a mix of government- and privately-funded think tanks.

Taiwanese think tanks in alphabetical order:

- Chung-Hua Institution for Economic Research
- Institute for National Defense and Security Research
- Prospect Foundation
- Taiwan Asia Exchange Foundation
- Taiwan Competitiveness Forum
- Taiwan Foundation for Democracy
- Taiwan Institute of Economic Research

==== Thailand ====
- Office of the National Economic and Social Development Council
- Thailand Development Research Institute
- iLaw

==== United Arab Emirates ====
The UAE has been a center for political oriented think tanks which concentrate on both regional and global policy. Notable think tank have emerged in the global debate on terrorism, education & economical policies in the MENA region. Think tanks include:

- Dubai Economic Council
- Orient Research Centre

=== European think tanks ===
==== Belgium ====
Brussels hosts most of the European Institutions, hence a large number of international think tanks are based there. Notable think tanks are Bruegel, the Centre for European Policy Studies (CEPS), Centre for the New Europe (CNE), the European Centre of International Political Economy (ECIPE), the European Policy Centre (EPC), the Friends of Europe, the Global Governance Institute (GGI), Liberales, and Sport and Citizenship, among others.

==== Bulgaria ====
Bulgaria has a number of think tanks providing expertise and shaping policies, including Institute of Modern Politics.

==== Czech Republic ====
- The European Values Think-Tank
- The Prague Security Studies Institute (PSSI)

==== Denmark ====
- CEPOS is a classic libertarian/free-market conservative think tank in Denmark.

==== Finland ====
Finland has several small think tanks that provide expertise in very specific fields. Notable think tanks include:

- Åland Islands Peace Institute
- Demos Helsinki
- European Centre of Excellence for Countering Hybrid Threats (Hybrid CoE)
- Crisis Management Initiative (CMI)
- Research Institute of the Finnish Economy (Etla)
- Finnish Institute of International Affairs

In addition to specific independent think tanks, the largest political parties have their own think tank organizations. This is mainly due to support granted by state for such activity. The corporate world has focused their efforts to central representative organization Confederation of Finnish Industries, which acts as think tank in addition to negotiating salaries with workers unions. Furthermore, there is the Finnish Business and Policy Forum (Elinkeinoelämän valtuuskunta, EVA). Agricultural and regional interests, associated with The Central Union of Agricultural Producers and Forest Owners (Maa- ja metsätaloustuottajain Keskusliitto, MTK) and the Centre Party, are researched by Pellervo Economic Research (Pellervon taloustutkimus, PTT). The Central Organisation of Finnish Trade Unions (Suomen Ammattiliittojen Keskusjärjestö, SAK) and the Social Democratic Party are associated with the Labour Institute for Economic Research (Palkansaajien tutkimuslaitos, PT). Each of these organizations often release forecasts concerning the national economy.

==== France ====
The French Institute of International Relations (IFRI) was founded in 1979 and is the third oldest think tank of western Europe, after Chatham House (UK, 1920) and the Stockholm International Peace Research Institute (Sweden, 1960). The primary goals of IFRI are to develop applied research in the field of public policy related to international issues, and foster interactive and constructive dialogue between researchers, professionals, and opinion leaders. France also hosts the European Union Institute for Security Studies (EUISS), a Paris-based agency of the European Union and think tank researching security issues of relevance for the EU. There are also a number of pro-business think tanks, notably the Paris-based Fondation Concorde. The foundation focuses on increasing the competitiveness of French SME's and aims to revive entrepreneurship in France.

On the left, the main think tanks in France are the Fondation Jean-Jaurès, which is organizationally linked to the French Socialist Party, and Terra Nova. Terra Nova is an independent left-leaning think tank, although it is nevertheless considered to be close to the Socialists. It works on producing reports and analyses of current public policy issues from a progressive point of view, and contributing to the intellectual renewal of social democracy.

==== Germany ====
In Germany all of the major parties are loosely associated with research foundations that play some role in shaping policy, but generally from the more disinterested role of providing research to support policymakers than explicitly proposing policy. These include the Konrad-Adenauer-Stiftung (Christian Democratic Union-aligned), the Friedrich-Ebert-Stiftung (Social Democratic Party-aligned), the Hanns-Seidel-Stiftung (Christian Social Union-aligned), the Heinrich-Böll-Stiftung (aligned with the Greens), Friedrich Naumann Foundation (Free Democratic Party-aligned) and the Rosa Luxemburg Foundation (aligned with Die Linke).

The German Institute for International and Security Affairs is a foreign policy think tank. Atlantic Community is an independent, non-partisan and non-profit organization set up as a joint project of Atlantische Initiative e.V. and Atlantic Initiative United States. The Institute for Media and Communication Policy deals with media-related issues. Transparency International is a think tank on the role of corporate and political corruption in international development.

==== Greece ====
In Greece there are many think tanks, also called research organisations or institutes.

==== Ireland ====
- The Economic and Social Research Institute (ESRI) is an independent research institute in Dublin, Ireland. Its research focuses on Ireland's economic and social development to inform policy-making and societal understanding.
- The Institute of International and European Affairs (IIEA) focuses on European and International affairs.
- The Iona Institute is a conservative, Catholic think tank.
- TASC (Think tank for Action on Social Change) is an Irish left-wing think tank.

==== Italy ====
- Bruno Leoni Institute
- Future Italy
- Centro Studi Internazionali
- ISPI – Italian Institute for International Political Studies
- Istituto Affari Internazionali
- Trinità dei Monti

==== Latvia ====
The oldest think tank in Latvia is the Latvian Institute of International Affairs. LIIA is a non governmental and non partisan foundation, established in 1992, and their research and advocacy mainly focuses on Latvian foreign policy; Transatlantic relations; European Union policies, including its neighborhood policy and Eastern Partnership; and multilateral and bilateral relations with Russia.

==== Netherlands ====
All major political parties in the Netherlands have state-sponsored research foundations that play a role in shaping policy. The Dutch government also has its own think tank: the Scientific Council for Government Policy. The Netherlands furthermore hosts the Netherlands Institute of International Relations Clingendael, or Clingendael Institute, an independent think tank and diplomatic academy which studies various aspects of international relations.

==== Poland ====
There is a large pool of think tanks in Poland on a wide variety of subjects. The oldest state-sponsored think tank is The Western Institute in Poznań (Polish: Instytut Zachodni). The second oldest is the Polish Institute of International Affairs (PISM) established in 1947. Another notable state-sponsored think tank is the Centre for Eastern Studies (OSW), which specializes in the countries neighboring Poland and in the Baltic Sea region, the Balkans, Turkey, the Caucasus and Central Asia. Among the private think tanks notable organizations include the Institute for Structural Research (IBS) on economic policy, The Casimir Pulaski Foundation on foreign policy, the Institute of Public Affairs (ISP) on social policy, and the Sobieski Institute.

==== Portugal ====
Founded in 1970, the SEDES is one of the oldest Portuguese civic associations and think tanks. Contraditório think tank was founded in 2008. Contraditório is a non-profit, independent and non-partisan think tank.

==== Romania ====
The Romanian Academic Society (SAR), founded in 1996, is a Romanian think tank for policy research.

==== Russia ====
- Valdai Discussion Club
- Izborsky Club

==== Serbia ====
The Foundation for the Advancement of Economics (FREN) was founded in 2005 by the Belgrade University's Faculty of Economics.

==== Slovakia ====
Think tanks originating in Slovakia:

- GLOBSEC – Global think tank committed to enhancing security, prosperity and sustainability in Europe and throughout the world.
- Central European Labour Studies Institute or CELSI (Stredoeurópsky inštitút pre výskum práce in Slovak) – Central-european think tank which specializes in broadly defined labor issues, labour markets, and labor policy.
- Forum Minority Research Institute (Fórum Kisebbségkutató Intézet or Fórum Intézet in Hungarian and Fórum inštitút pre výskum menšín or Fórum inštitút in Slovak) – Think tank focusing on ethnic minorities living in Slovakia, especially Hungarians.

International think tanks with presence in Slovakia:

- Institute of Public Affairs (Inštitút pre verejné otázky or IVO in Slovak) – Australian-based think tank focusing on public policy issues.
- Open Society Foundations or OSF – US-based think tank with an aim of advancing justice, education, public health and independent media.
- Martens Centre (via the Anton Tunega Foundation) – Belgium-based think tank and political foundation of the European People's Party (EPP) which embodies a pan-European mindset and promotes Christian-democratic and liberal-conservative political values.

==== Spain ====
The Elcano Royal Institute was created in 2001 following the example of the Royal Institute of International Affairs (Chatham House) in the UK, although it is closely linked to (and receives funding from) the government in power.

Former Prime Minister José Maria Aznar presides over the Fundación para el Analisis y los Estudios Sociales (FAES), a policy institute that is associated with the conservative Popular Party (PP). Also linked to the PP is the Grupo de Estudios Estratégicos (GEES), which is known for its defense- and security-related research and analysis. For its part, the Fundación Alternativas is independent but close to left-wing ideas. The Socialist Partido Socialista Obrero Español (PSOE) created Fundación Ideas in 2009 and dissolved it in January 2014. Also in 2009, the centrist Union, Progress and Democracy (UPyD) created Fundación Progreso y Democracia (FPyD).

==== Sweden ====
Timbro is a free market think tank and book publisher based in Stockholm.

==== Switzerland ====
Think tanks based within Switzerland include:

- Avenir Suisse, founded in 1999 by fifteen of the largest Swiss companies. It is supported by over 130 companies to date.
- DCAF, the Geneva Centre for the Democratic Control of Armed Forces, founded in 2000 to research security sector governance and reform.
- Gottlieb Duttweiler Institute (GDI), conceived by Migros-founder Gottlieb Duttweiler in 1946.
- Horasis, which hosts the annual Horasis Global Meeting
- Liberal Institute, founded in 1979.

==== Ukraine ====
As of 2022, there are nearly 100 registered think tanks in Ukraine, including:

- Centre of Policy and Legal Reform (CPLR), a non-governmental think tank founded in 1996.
- Center for Policy Studies in Ukraine, a non-governmental think tank founded in 1994.
- International Centre for Policy Studies, a non-governmental think tank founded in 1994.
- Razumkov Centre, a non-governmental think tank founded in 1994. It carries out research of public policy in the following spheres: domestic policy; state administration; economic policy; energy; land relations; foreign policy; social policy; international and regional security; national security and defense.
- Transatlantic Dialogue Center, a non-governmental think tank founded in 2021.

==== United Kingdom ====
In Britain, think tanks play a similar role to the United States, attempting to shape policy, and indeed there is some cooperation between British and American think tanks. For example, the London-based think tank Chatham House and the Council on Foreign Relations were both conceived at the Paris Peace Conference, 1919 and have remained sister organisations.

The Bow Group, founded in 1951, is the oldest centre-right think tank and many of its members have gone on to serve as Members of Parliament or Members of the European Parliament. Past chairmen have included Conservative Party leader Michael Howard, Margaret Thatcher's longest-serving Cabinet Minister Geoffrey Howe, Chancellor of the Exchequer Norman Lamont and former British Telecom chairman Christopher Bland.

Since 2000, a number of influential centre-right think tanks have emerged including Policy Exchange, Centre for Social Justice and most recently Onward.

=== Oceanian think tanks ===
==== Australia ====
Most Australian think tanks are based at universities – for example, the Melbourne Institute – or are government-funded – for example, the Productivity Commission or the CSIRO.

Private sources fund about 20 to 30 "independent" Australian think tanks. The best-known of these think tanks play a much more limited role in Australian public and business policy-making than do their equivalents in the United States. However, in the past decade the number of think tanks has increased substantially. Prominent think tanks on the right include the Centre for Independent Studies, the Sydney Institute, the Lowy Institute, and the Institute of Public Affairs. Prominent think tanks on the left include the McKell Institute, Per Capita, the Australia Institute, and the Centre for Policy Development.

Think tanks in Australia include:

- Air Power Australia
- Asia Education Foundation
- Asialink
- The Australia Institute
- Australian Fabian Society
- Australian Institute of International Affairs
- Australian Institute of Policy & Science
- Australian Strategic Policy Institute
- The Brisbane Institute
- Centre for Independent Studies
- Centre for Policy Development
- Chifley Research Centre
- Committee for Economic Development of Australia
- Crowther Centre for Learning and Innovation
- Development Policy Centre
- Doctors Reform Society of Australia
- Evatt Foundation
- Grattan Institute
- H. R. Nicholls Society
- Infrastructure Partnerships Australia
- Institute for Economics and Peace
- Institute of Public Affairs
- International Energy Centre
- International WaterCentre
- Issues Deliberation Australia/America
- Laboratory for Visionary Architecture
- Lowy Institute for International Policy
- The Green Institute
- The McKell Institute
- The Melbourne Institute of Applied Economic and Social Research
- Menzies Research Centre
- National Civic Council
- New South Wales Institute for Educational Research
- Samuel Griffith Society
- Strategic and Defence Studies Centre
- Sydney Institute
- United States Studies Centre
- Western Australia Policy Forum

==== New Zealand ====
Think tanks based in New Zealand include:

- Centre for Strategic Studies New Zealand
- Child Poverty Action Group (Aotearoa New Zealand)
- Helen Clark Foundation
- Maxim Institute
- McGuinness Institute
- Motu Economic and Public Policy Research
- New Zealand Initiative
- New Zealand Institute of Economic Research

=== North American think tanks ===
==== Canada ====
Canada has many notable think tanks (listed in alphabetical order). Each has specific areas of interest with some overlaps.

- Asia Pacific Foundation of Canada
- Atlantic Institute for Market Studies
- Broadbent Institute
- C.D. Howe Institute
- Caledon Institute of Social Policy
- Canada West Foundation
- Canadian Centre for Policy Alternatives
- Canadian Global Affairs Institute
- Canadian Institute for Advanced Research
- Canadian International Council
- Canadian Policy Research Networks (disbanded)
- Canadian Tax Foundation
- Cardus
- Centre for International Governance Innovation
- Conference Board of Canada
- Council of Canadians
- Fraser Institute
- Frontier Centre for Public Policy
- Institute for Research on Public Policy
- Institute on Governance
- International Institute for Sustainable Development
- Macdonald–Laurier Institute
- Montreal Economic Institute
- Mowat Centre for Policy Innovation
- National Citizens Coalition
- North-South Institute
- Parkland Institute
- Pembina Institute
- Public Policy Forum

==== Mexico ====
- CIDAC – The Center of Research for Development (Centro de Investigación para el Desarrollo, Asociación Civil) is a not-for-profit think tank that undertakes research and proposes viable policy options for Mexico's economic and democratic development. The organization seeks to promote open, pluralistic debate pursuing: the Rule of Law & Democracy, market economics, social development, and strengthening Mexico-United States relations.
- CIDE – The Center of Research and Economics Teaching (Centro de Investigación y Docencia Económicas) is a think tank institute focussing on "public policies", "public choice", "democracy", and "economy".

==== United States ====
As the classification is most often used today, the oldest American think tank is the Carnegie Endowment for International Peace, founded in 1910. The Institute for Government Research, which later merged with two organizations to form the Brookings Institution, was formed in 1916. Other early twentieth century organizations now classified as think tanks include the Hoover Institution (1919), The Twentieth Century Fund (1919, and now known as the Century Foundation), the National Bureau of Economic Research (1920), the Council on Foreign Relations (1921), and the Social Science Research Council (1923). The Great Depression and its aftermath spawned several economic policy organizations, such as the National Planning Association (1934), the Tax Foundation (1937), and the Committee for Economic Development (1943).

In collaboration with the Douglas Aircraft Company, the Air Force set up the RAND Corporation in 1946 to develop weapons technology and strategic defense analysis.

The Hudson Institute is a conservative American think tank founded in 1961 by futurist, military strategist, and systems theorist Herman Kahn and his colleagues at the RAND Corporation. Recent members include Mike Pompeo, the former secretary of state under Donald Trump who joined in 2021.

More recently, progressive and liberal think tanks have been established, most notably the Center for American Progress and the Center for Research on Educational Access and Leadership (CREAL). The organization has close ties to former United States President Barack Obama and other prominent Democrats.

Think tanks have been important allies for United States presidents since the Reagan administration, writing and suggesting policies to implement, and providing staff for the administration. For recent conservative presidents, think tanks such as The Heritage Foundation, the Hoover Institution, and the American Enterprise Institute (AEI) were closely associated with the Reagan administration. The George H. W. Bush administration worked closely with AEI, and the George W. Bush administration worked closely with AEI and the Hoover Institution. The Trump administration works closely with the Heritage Foundation. For recent liberal presidents, the Progressive Policy Institute and its parent the Democratic Leadership Council were closely associated with the Clinton administration, and the Center for American Progress was closely associated with the Obama and Biden administrations.

Think tanks help shape both foreign and domestic policy. They receive funding from private donors, and members of private organizations. By 2013, the largest 21 think tanks in the US spent more than US$1 billion per year. Think tanks may feel more free to propose and debate controversial ideas than people within government. The progressive media watchdog Fairness and Accuracy in Reporting (FAIR) has identified the top 25 think tanks by media citations, noting that from 2006 to 2007 the number of citations declined 17%. The FAIR report reveals the ideological breakdown of the citations: 37% conservative, 47% centrist, and 16% liberal. Their data show that the most-cited think tank was the Brookings Institution, followed by the Council on Foreign Relations, the American Enterprise Institute, The Heritage Foundation, and the Center for Strategic and International Studies.

In 2016, in response to scrutiny about think tanks appearing to have a "conflict of interest" or lack transparency, executive vice president, Martin S. Indyk of Brookings Institution – the "most prestigious think tank in the world" admitted that they had "decided to prohibit corporations or corporate-backed foundations from making anonymous contributions." In August 2016, The New York Times published a series on think tanks that blur the line. One of the cases the journalists cited was Brookings, where scholars paid by a seemingly independent think tank "push donors' agendas amplifying a culture of corporate influence in Washington."

===== U.S. government think tanks =====
Government think tanks are also important in the United States, particularly in the security and defense field. These include the Center for Technology and National Security Policy at the National Defense University, the Center for Naval Warfare Studies at the Naval War College, and the Strategic Studies Institute at the U.S. Army War College.

The government funds, wholly or in part, activities at approximately 30 Federally Funded Research and Development Centers (FFRDCs). FFRDCs, are unique independent nonprofit entities sponsored and funded by the United States government to meet specific long-term technical needs that cannot be met by any other single organization. FFRDCs typically assist government agencies with scientific research and analysis, systems development, and systems acquisition. They bring together the expertise and outlook of government, industry, and academia to solve complex technical problems. These FFRDCs include the RAND Corporation, the MITRE Corporation, the Institute for Defense Analyses, the Aerospace Corporation, the MIT Lincoln Laboratory, and other organizations supporting various departments within the United States Government.

Similar to the above quasi-governmental organizations are Federal Advisory Committees. These groups, sometimes referred to as commissions, are a form of think tank dedicated to advising the US Presidents or the Executive branch of government. They typically focus on a specific issue and as such, might be considered similar to special interest groups. However, unlike special interest groups these committees have come under some oversight regulation and are required to make formal records available to the public. As of 2002, about 1,000 of these advisory committees were described in the FACA searchable database.

=== South American think tanks ===
Research done by Enrique Mendizabal shows that South American think tanks play various roles depending on their origins, historical development and relations to other policy actors. In this study, Orazio Bellettini from Grupo FARO suggests that they:

- Seek political support for policies.
- Legitimize policies. This has been clearer in Ecuador, Bolivia and Peru. New governments in Ecuador and Peru have approached policy institutes for support for already defined policies. In Bolivia, the government of Evo Morales has been working with Non-Government Organizations (NGOs) and other research institutes to do the same. However, in Chile, many think tanks during the 1990s seemed to endorse and maintain the legitimacy of policies implemented during the previous decade by the military dictatorship headed by Pinochet.
- Act as Spaces for debate. In this case think tanks serve as sounding boards for new policies. In Chile, during the Pinochet dictatorship, many left wing intellectuals and researchers found 'asylum' in think tanks. In Ecuador, think tanks are seen as spaces where politicians can test the soundness of their policies and government plans.
- Provide financial channels for political parties or other interest groups. In Ecuador and Bolivia, German foundations have been able to provide funds to think tanks that work with certain political parties. This method has provided support to the system as a whole rather than individual CSOs.
- Supply expert staff of policy-makers. In Peru after the end of the Fujimori regime, and in Chile after the fall of Pinochet, think tank staff left to form part of the new governments. In the United States, the role of major think tanks is precisely that: host scholars for a few months or years and then lose them to government employ.

How a policy institute addresses these largely depends on how they work, their ideology vs. evidence credentials, and the context in which they operate including funding opportunities, the degree and type of competition they have and their staff.

This functional method addresses the inherit challenge of defining a think tank. As Simon James said in 1998, "Discussion of think tanks...has a tendency to get bogged down in the vexed question of defining what we mean by 'think tank'—an exercise that often degenerates into futile semantics." It is better (as in the Network Functions Approach) to describe what the organisation should do. Then the shape of the organisation should follow to allow this to happen. The following framework (based on Stephen Yeo's description of think tanks' mode of work) is described in Enrique Mendizabal's blog "onthinktanks":

First, policy institutes may work in or base their funding on one or more of:

- Independent research: this would be work done with core or flexible funding that allows the researchers the liberty to choose their research questions and method. It may be long term and could emphasize 'big ideas' without direct policy relevance. However, it could emphasize a major policy problem that requires a thorough research and action investment.
- Consultancy: this would be work done by commission with specific clients and addressing one or two major questions. Consultancies often respond to an existing agenda.
- Influencing/advocacy: this would be work done by communications, capacity development, networking, campaigns, lobbying, etc. It is likely to be based on research based evidence emerging from independent research or consultancies.

Second, policy institutes may base their work or arguments on:

- Ideology, values or interests
- Applied, empirical or synthesis research
- Theoretical or academic research

According to the National Institute for Research Advancement, a Japanese policy institute, think tanks are "one of the main policy actors in democratic societies ..., assuring a pluralistic, open and accountable process of policy analysis, research, decision-making and evaluation". A study in early 2009 found a total of 5,465 think tanks worldwide. Of that number, 1,777 were based in the United States and approximately 350 in Washington, DC, alone.

==== Argentina ====
As of 2009, Argentina is home to 122 think tanks, many specializing in public policy and economics issues. Argentina ranks fifth in the number of these institutions worldwide.

==== Brazil ====
Working on public policies, Brazil hosts, for example, Instituto Liberdade, a University-based Center at Tecnopuc inside the Pontifícia Universidade Católica do Rio Grande do Sul, located in the South Region of the country, in the city of Porto Alegre. Instituto Liberdade is among the Top 40 think tanks in Latin America and the Caribbean, according to the 2009 Global Go To Think Tanks Index a report from the University of Pennsylvania's Think Tanks and Civil Societies Program (TTCSP).

Fundação Getulio Vargas (Getulio Vargas Foundation (FGV)) is a Brazilian higher education institution. Its original goal was to train people for the country's public- and private-sector management. Today it hosts faculties (Law, Business, Economics, Social Sciences and Mathematics), libraries, and also research centers in Rio, São Paulo and Brasilia. It is considered by Foreign Policy magazine to be a top-five "policymaker think tank" worldwide.

The Igarapé Institute is a Brazilian think tank focusing on public, climate, and digital security.

=== Transcontinental countries (Asia-Europe) ===
==== Armenia ====
According to a 2020 report, there are 32 think tanks or similar institutions in Armenia.

The government closed the Noravank Foundation, a government-affiliated think tank, in 2018 after almost two decades of operation. However, other think tanks continue to operate, include the Caucasus Institute, the Caucasus Research Resource Center-Armenia (CRRC-Armenia) (which publishes the "Caucasus Barometer" annual public opinion survey of the South Caucasus, the "Enlight" Public Research Center, and the AMBERD research center at the Armenian State University of Economics.

==== Azerbaijan ====
According to research done by the University of Pennsylvania, there are a total of 12 think tanks in Azerbaijan.

The Center for Economic and Social Development, or CESD; in Azeri, Azerbaijan, İqtisadi və Sosial İnkişaf Mərkəzi (İSİM) is an Azeri think tank, non-profit organization, NGO based in Baku, Azerbaijan. The center was established in 2005. CESD focuses on policy advocacy and reform, and is involved with policy research and capacity building.

The Economic Research Center (ERC) is a policy-research oriented non-profit think tank established in 1999 with a mission to facilitate sustainable economic development and good governance in the new public management system of Azerbaijan. It seeks to do this by building favorable interactions between the public, private and civil society and working with different networks both in local (EITI NGO Coalition, National Budget Group, Public Coalition Against Poverty, etc.) and international levels (PWYP, IBP, ENTO, ALDA, PASOS, WTO NGO Network etc.).

The Center for Strategic Studies under the President of Azerbaijan is a governmental, non-profit think tank founded in 2007. It focuses on domestic and foreign policy.

==== Russia ====
According to the Foreign Policy Research Institute, Russia has 112 think tanks, while Russian think tanks claimed four of the top ten spots in 2011's "Top Thirty Think Tanks in Central and Eastern Europe".

Notable Russian think tanks include:

- Carnegie Moscow Center
- Institute for US and Canadian Studies
- Institute of World Economy and International Relations
- Moscow State Institute of International Relations

==== Turkey ====
Turkish think tanks are relatively new, having emerged in the 1960s. There are at least 20 think tanks in the country, both independent and supported by government. Many of them are sister organizations of political parties, universities or companies some are independent and others are supported by government. Most Turkish think tanks provide research and ideas, yet they play less important roles in policy making than American think tanks. Turksam, Tasam and the Journal of Turkish Weekly are the leading information sources.

The oldest and most influential think tank in Turkey is ESAM (The Center for Economic and Social Research; Turkish: Ekonomik ve Sosyal Araştırmalar Merkezi) which was established in 1969 and has headquarters in Ankara. There are also branch offices of ESAM in Istanbul, Bursa, Konya and elsewhere. ESAM has strong international relationships, especially with Muslim countries and societies. Ideologically it performs policies, produces ideas and manages projects in parallel to Milli Görüş and also influences political parties and international strategies. The founder and leader of Milli Görüş, Necmettin Erbakan, was very concerned with the activities and brainstorming events of ESAM. In The Republic of Turkey, two presidents, four prime ministers, various ministers, many members of the parliament, and numerous mayors and bureaucrats have been members of ESAM.

The Turkish Economic and Social Studies Foundation (TESEV) is another leading think tank. Established in 1994, TESEV is an independent non-governmental think tank, analyzing social, political and economic policy issues facing Turkey. TESEV has raised issues about Islam and democracy, combating corruption, state reform, and transparency and accountability. TESEV serve as a bridge between academic research and policy-making. Its core program areas are democratization, good governance, and foreign policy.

Other notable Turkish think tanks are the International Strategic Research Organisation (USAK), the Foundation for Political, Economic and Social Research (SETA), and the Wise Men Center for Strategic Studies (BİLGESAM).

== See also ==
- Collective intelligence
- Futurists
- Internet think tanks
- List of think tanks
- List of think tanks in the United States
- Lobbying
- Mass collaboration
- Mass communication
- Overton window
- School of thought
- Strategic studies
- TED (conference)
