= Connor Court =

Australian book publisher

Connor Court Publishing is an Australian publishing company based in Brisbane, Queensland. The company, founded in September 2005 by Anthony Cappello, publishes all sorts of commercial books – including many biographies, books on politics, climate denialism, culture and education.

== History ==
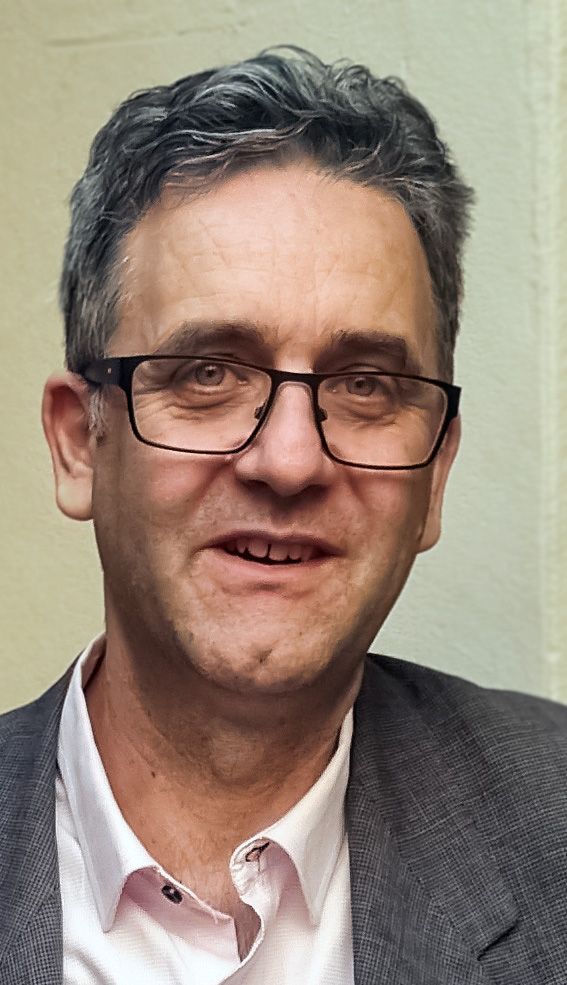
Connor Court founder Anthony Cappello

The name "Connor Court" comes from a concatenation of the American writer Flannery O'Connor and 17th century Dutch economist Pieter de la Court. Connor Court was founded in Ballan, Victoria, before moving to Ballarat and then, in 2016, to Queensland. Before starting Connor Court, Cappello worked at Freedom Publishing imprint of the late B. A. Santamaria's National Civic Council (NCC).

Connor Court publishes a diverse range of books but has a focus on conservative and religious subjects. Connor Court has published many authors, contributing authors and editors from the Institute of Public Affairs, such as Andrew McIntyre, Chris Berg, John Roskam, Cory Bernardii, Tim Wilson, Gary Johns, Mikayla Novak, James Grant, Alan Moran, Bob Day, Simon Breheny and Tom Switzer. John Roskam, executive director of the Institute of Public Affairs, sits on the editorial board of Connor Court. Connor Court has also published books in conjunction with the Institute of Public Affairs, such as Australian Essays by Roger Scruton.

Authors published include Cardinal George Pell, John Killick, Peter Coleman and James Franklin. Its books have been launched by prominent public figures such as Peter Costello, Tony Abbott, Dean Brown, Jack Snelling, Steve Bracks, John Howard and Warren Mundine.

Recent authors include Ken Phillips, Barry Cohen, Ian Plimer, Peta Seaton, Jeff Bennett, Barry Dickins, Kerry Cue and Rabbi Shimon Cowen. Titles for 2009 included books on bioethics, global warming, ecology and utilitarianism. In 2011 it began publishing titles on Australian Rules Football.

One of its titles, The Light River, by Hal Colebatch, won the Poetry Category in the 2007 Premier's Award of Western Australia. In 2009, it published Heaven and Earth by Ian Plimer. According to the publisher, the book sold over 40,000 copies and reached number one on the Nielsen BookScan Australia on 2 May 2009.

In 2012, Connor Court authors ranged from Gary Johns to Barry Dickins.

In 2015, Connor Court published a biography of the former Queensland Premier Campbell Newman, and launched the book at Tattersall's Club, Brisbane. The book caused controversy, with a number of publishers turning it down and a number of bookstores not stocking it, as a protest against Newman's withdrawal of funding for the Premier's Literary Awards while in government.

== Publications ==
Publications include:

- Mark Lawson, (2010), A Guide to Climate Change Lunacy, ISBN 978-1-921421-42-6
- Ian Plimer. (2009), Heaven and Earth: Global Warming the missing Science, ISBN 978-1-921421-14-3
- Garth Paltridge, (2009), The Climate Caper, ISBN 978-1-921421-25-9
- Robert L. Bradley, (2004), Climate Alarmism Reconsidered, ISBN 0-255-36541-1
- Anthony Paganoni, (2007), The Pastoral Care of Italians in Australia ISBN 978-1-921421-01-3
- George Pell, (2007), God and Caesar ISBN 978-0-9802936-8-5
- James Franklin, ed, (2007), Life to the Full: Rights and Social Justice in Australia, ISBN 978-1-921421-00-6
- Brian Coman, (2007) A Loose Canon: Essays on History, Modernity and Tradition, ISBN 978-0-9802936-2-3
- Peter Coleman, (2006), The Heart of James McAuley (2nd ed), ISBN 978-0-9758015-6-7
- James Franklin, (2006), Catholic Values and Australian Realities, ISBN 978-0-9758015-4-3
- Joseph N. Santamaria, The Education of Dr Joe, ISBN 0-9758015-3-8
- John Flader, (2008) Question Time: 150 Questions and Answers on the Catholic Faith, ISBN 978-1-921421-05-1
- Tess Livingstone, (2008) Enid Blyton at Old Thatch, ISBN 978-1-921421-03-7
- Hal Colebatch, (2007) The Light River, ISBN 0-9802936-4-2
- Mark Lopez, (2008), The Little Black School Book: Volume 1. The Secret to Getting Straight 'As' at School and University, ISBN 978-1-921421-07-5
- George Pell, (2010), Test Everything, ISBN 978-1-921421-37-2
- Desmond O'Grady, (2010), A Word in Edgeways, ISBN 978-1-921421-35-8
- Chris Berg and John Roskam, (2010), 100 Great Books on Liberty, ISBN 978-1-921421-21-1
- John Molony, 2010, By Wendouree, Memories 1951-1963, ISBN 978-1-921421-40-2
- Guy Barnett, 2010, Make a Difference: A Practical Guide to Lobbying, ISBN 978-1-921421-41-9
