= Institute of Public Affairs =

Australian public policy think tank

Institute of Public Affairs (IPA)
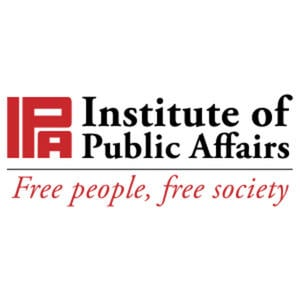
- Established: 1943
- Chair: Janet Albrechtsen
- Executive Director: Scott Hargreaves
- Budget: FYE June 2023; Income: A$11,600,000; Expenses: A$8,560,000
- Members: 8,200
- Location: Level 2, 410 Collins Street, Melbourne. Victoria, Australia
- Coordinates: 37.8170°S 144.9606°E
- Interactive map of Institute of Public Affairs (IPA)
- Website: ipa.org.au

The Institute of Public Affairs (IPA) is a conservative non-profit free market public policy think tank, which is based in Melbourne, Victoria, Australia. It advocates free-market economic policies, such as privatisation, deregulation of state-owned enterprises, trade liberalisation, deregulation of workplaces, abolition of the minimum wage, criticism of socialism, and repeal of Section 18C of the Racial Discrimination Act 1975. It also rejects large parts of climate science.

The IPA was founded during World War II by businessmen in response to the growing power of the Labor Party and international socialism, and has typically aligned with, and supported, the Liberal Party in politics. It has in the past funded and created advertising campaigns for anti-Labor candidates, and has had an impact on Liberal Party policies, according to former prime minister John Howard.

== History ==
Historian Michael Bertram, writing in 1989, identified three distinct periods for the Institute of Public Affairs:

1. the war years and "immediate post-war years" where Australia's economic future was in question, ending with the election of Robert Menzies in 1949;
2. the "Keynesian consensus" of the 1950s and 1960s and
3. the "sea-shift to the right" of the 1970s and 1980s.

=== War and immediate post-war years (1943–1949) ===
The Institute of Public Affairs was founded in 1943 as the Institute of Public Affairs Victoria, with Charles Kemp as its inaugural director and George Coles as its inaugural chair. The founders were prominent businessmen, and current executive director John Roskam says of the occasion: "Big business created the IPA". The idea to form the Institute of Public Affairs was first floated in the Victorian Chamber of Manufactures.

The IPA's formation was prompted by the collapse of Australia's main right-wing party, the United Australia Party. The IPA's initial purpose was to influence Australia's post-war reconstruction, with business interests concerned that popular sentiment supported a Labor-led, collectivist post-war construction, a "prevailing clamour for a new kind of society".

Throughout 1943, branches were set up in New South Wales (May), South Australia (June) and Queensland (August), although the state branches remained administratively and ideologically distinct (the SA and Queensland branches closed in the 1950s). There seems to have been a pre-existing body called the Institute of Public Affairs in Western Australia, which operated between 1941 and 1942. The IPA NSW engaged in "party political activism", while at the IPA Victoria's first annual meeting in 1944 chair GJ Coles said that they "did not wish to be directly involved in politics".

In March 1943, the head of the Commonwealth Security Service (CSS), Brigadier William Simpson requested a report into whether the newly formed IPA had sympathies with "fascism", "counter-revolution" or the powers with which Australia was at war, but his deputy director said that the IPA's committee and sponsors were "beyond reproach".

The CSS was restructured in late 1943 and it again investigated the IPA's state branches. The IPA Queensland's radio play The Harris Family was required to be submitted to and approved by the Chief-Inspector (Wireless). The second review was completed in 1944. The CSS reported that nothing could be found to suggest that the IPA was subversive, and the war record of its supporters was "very fine", although two of the IPA NSW's council members were members of the Japan-Australia Society and one was associated with the Old Guard. The National Archives of Australia preserve the CSS' reports into each branch, as well as material collected in the course of their investigation.

In October 1944, the IPA printed 50,000 copies of Looking Forward, an 80-page booklet which set out the possibilities of post-war reconstruction. Robert Menzies described Looking Forward as "the finest statement of basic political and academic problems made in Australia for many years".

The IPA had no formal association with the formation of the Liberal Party of Australia by Menzies in 1945. Political scientist Marian Simms says that the IPA's role was to act as "an interim finance collector for non-Labor political interests", initiate "the unification of the non-Labor organizations in Victoria ... and then [mediate] among them" and provide "much of the content of the federal platform of the LPA and propaganda for political campaigns". Looking Forward was influential in the Liberal Party's inaugural platform.

Norman Abjorensen credits the IPA in this period with the collapse in ALP support, saying that the IPA was "the architect of a stream of propaganda that sought, successfully, to discredit Australia's very moderate Labor Party as a socialist tiger waiting to pounce once the war had ended."

Founders (IPA Victoria)
G. J. Coles (chairman)	Chairman of Directors, G. J. Coles & Co.
H. G. Darling	Chairman of Directors, BHP
Captain C. A. M. Derham	President, Victorian Chamber of Manufacturers.
G. H. Grimwade	Director, Drug Houses of Australia.
H. R. Harper	General Manager, the Victoria Insurance Co.
W. A. Ince	Lawyer and Company Director.
F. E. Lampe	President, Australian Council of Retailers.
Sir Walter Massy-Greene	Company Director, with a distinguished past career in Federal politics.
Sir Keith Murdoch	Chairman of Directors, Herald & Weekly Times.
L. J. McConnan	Chief Manager, the National Bank of Australasia
Cecil N. McKay	Managing Director, H. V. McKay-Massey-Harris.
W. E. McPherson	Chairman of Directors, McPherson's.
W. I. Potter	Founder, Ian Potter & Co. (Sharebrokers).
A. G. Warner	Managing Director, Electronic Industries.

=== Keynesian consensus (1949–1972) ===
During the 1950s and 1960s, the IPA "came to wholeheartedly support" Keynesian economics, with director C. D. Kemp writing "we are all socialists now". Over this period, the Institute argued for Australia's migration rate to be halved, which drew criticism from the Australian Industries Development Association and The Age. The institute also identified inflation as a major issue, and opposed the abolition of the means test, called for lower taxes, criticised the introduction of the Trade Practices Act, advocated for fewer restraints on foreign investment and celebrated Britain joining the European Economic Community.

In 1962, the IPA dropped "Victoria" from its name, an act that caused relations between it and the IPA NSW to "deteriorate further".

=== "Sea-shift to the right" (1972–1995) ===
In the 1970s, the IPA and IPA NSW cooperated to establish Enterprise Australia. This organisation had as "an immediate target ... the removal of the present Labor government in Canberra", while the IPA ostensibly stayed at arm's length in an attempt to be perceived as above party politics.

From its founding to the late 1970s, the IPA had been associated with anti-socialist Keynesian economics and protectionist industry. The appointment of Rod Kemp (CD Kemp's son) as executive director in 1982, along with other administrative changes that had occurred in the late 1970s and early 1980s, marked a shift to neo-liberal ideology that continues to this day.

In June 1987 the IPA was incorporated as a company limited by guarantee.

In 1989, the IPA NSW – which had always been administratively and ideologically distinct – changed name to the Sydney Institute, and transitioned from neo-liberal think tank to discussion forum. The IPA NSW had a budget of $120,000 in 1985, compared to the IPA Victoria's $300,000.

Rod Kemp left his position as executive director in 1989 as he had been elected to Parliament.

In 1991, the IPA amalgamated with the Perth-based Australian Institute of Public Policy and John Hyde moved from executive director of the Australian Institute of Public Policy to executive director of the IPA. The AIPP had been founded by Hyde in 1983 as a neo-liberal think tank, and the merger brought its annual revenue of about $300,000 or $400,000 to the IPA. Hyde described the merger as "joining forces with old friends".

The IPA cooperated with the Tasman Institute on Project Victoria, which provided a blueprint for the privatisation and deregulation of the Victorian economy when Jeff Kennett became premier in 1992. The research was done with the assistance of Westpac staff seconded to work on the project.

=== Nahan and Roskam eras (1995–present) ===
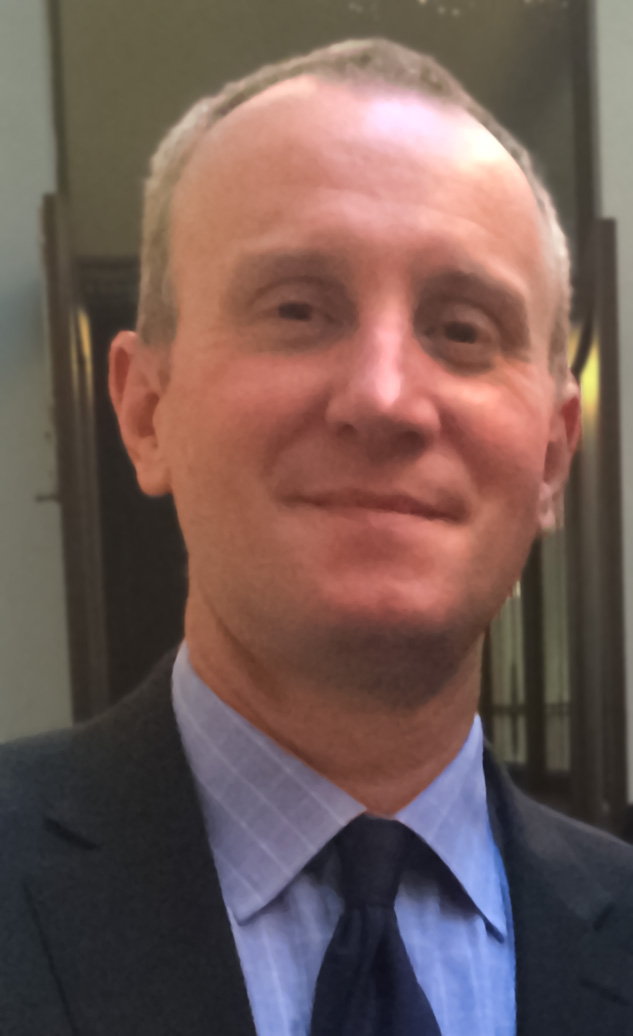
Former IPA Executive Director John Roskam

John Roskam replaced Mike Nahan as executive director in 2005, although he had worked at the IPA for a number of years before that.

Between 2009 and 2013, the IPA's annual revenue doubled to $3.2 million a year, an increase attributed by Roskam to the IPA's campaign against parts of the Racial Discrimination Act and the Gillard government's media regulation proposals.

In 2008, former executive director of the IPA Rod Kemp was appointed chair of the IPA.

In 2013 the IPA celebrated its 70th anniversary, MCed by political commentator Andrew Bolt. Notable in attendance at the celebrations were:

- Gina Rinehart
- Rupert Murdoch
- Tony Abbott – Liberal Opposition Leader
- George Pell – Australian Cardinal of the Roman Catholic Church
- Michael Kroger – then President of the Victorian division of the Liberal Party of Australia and former director of the IPA
- Mitch Fifield – Liberal Communications Minister
- Robert Doyle – Liberal Lord Mayor of Melbourne
- Denis Napthine – Liberal Premier of Victoria

In August 2018, Australian Public Service Commissioner John Lloyd resigned during an investigation into correspondence he had with his former colleagues at the Institute of Public Affairs. On the day he retired, the investigation concluded that he had breached the Australian Public Service code of conduct by corresponding with the Institute of Public Affairs, but the breach did not warrant sanction. Lloyd subsequently returned to work at the IPA.

In 2018, the IPA held two dinners to celebrate its 75th anniversary. The first was sponsored by Visy and took place on 21 August, the night of the first 2018 Liberal Party of Australia leadership spill. Former prime minister John Howard was interviewed at the dinner by Janet Albrechtsen about the spill, but did not explicitly support either candidate. Gina Rinehart and Rupert Murdoch praised US President Donald Trump at the dinner.

The second dinner was hosted by Crown Melbourne in November, and was hosted by Janet Albrechtsen, Andrew Bolt and Brendan O'Neill. Guests included chair of Liberal Party fundraiser the Cormack Foundation Charles Goode; former Cormack board members Hugh Morgan and John Calvert-Jones; Liberal minister Alan Tudge; and Liberal strategist Brian Loughnane.

In 2020, the IPA released a video featuring then-Director of Policy Gideon Rozner, calling for an end to COVID-19 lockdown measures. The video was released on 4 April, less than a week after Australia's COVID-19 National Cabinet had agreed to the lockdowns. This effectively made the IPA the first organisation in Australia to call for an end to lockdowns, a highly controversial stance at the time.

In 2021, in reaction to Victorian Labor government moves to ban the public display of the Nazi swastika and other hate symbols, Roskam decried the move as "the most vicious attack on free speech ever contemplated anywhere in Australia".

In 2023, the IPA collaborated with free market think tanks Centre for Independent Studies, LibertyWorks (founded by entrepreneur Andrew Cooper), conservative lobby group Advance, and several fossil fuel companies to coordinate the No campaign during the 2023 Australian Indigenous Voice referendum.

== Finances and donors ==
The IPA is funded by its membership, which include both private individuals and businesses.

It has been significantly funded by Hancock Prospecting, of which Gina Rinehart is the Executive Chair. Hancock Prospecting paid the IPA $2.3 million in financial year 2016 and $2.2 million in financial year 2017, which represents one-third to a half of the IPA's total revenue in those years. These payments were not disclosed in IPA annual reports, and Rinehart's daughter Bianca Hope Heyward submitted in court that the Hancock Prospecting payments were credited to Rinehart in an individual capacity. Gina Rinehart was made a life member of the IPA in November 2016.

Other businesses who fund or have funded the IPA include ExxonMobil, Telstra, WMC Resources, Philip Morris, Murray Irrigation Limited, Visy, Clough Engineering, Caltex, Shell, Esso and British American Tobacco (BAT).

Funders are able to "earmark" their payments to support the work of particular units within the IPA.

The Institute of Public Affairs has also been funded by Liberal Party associated entity the Cormack Foundation.

In 2003, the Howard Government provided $50,000 to the Institute of Public Affairs to review the accountability of NGOs.

== Political links and networking ==
The IPA Victoria was founded during World War II by businessmen in response to the feared growing power of the Labor Party and international socialism, with founder C. D. Kemp putting the case to the Victorian Chamber of Manufactures sub-committee as such:

The freedom of Australian business is today gravely threatened by forces whose unswerving and rigid purpose is the entire nationalisation of industry and the establishment of socialism as the permanent form of Australian society; this would mean the elimination of private capital and shareholding, profit, freedom of private enterprise and the transfer of the control of industry to civil servants and union leaders. These forces are centred politically in the Labor Party and industrially in the Trade Unions; they are supported by an extremely powerful and growing section of public opinion.

— Charles Denton Kemp

The IPA Victoria was founded as an apolitical organisation, and rejected the IPA NSW's strategy of "direct short term political action to defeat the Labor Party with an emphasis on propaganda". However, the IPA Victoria acted as a finance committee for non-Labor parties in its first year, and the IPA Treasurer at the time reportedly said that much of the IPA Victoria's funding was conditional on it being spent to "fight socialism at the coming election" (the 1943 Australian federal election). Its Publicity and Research Bureau wrote political broadcasters, provided speakers' notes to all endorsed United Australia Party and United Country Party candidates and producing advertisements.

The IPA Victoria's direct involvement in federal politics was reappraised after the 1943 election, and the organisation handed over responsibility for fundraising to the extra-parliamentary wing of the United Australia Party. The IPA Victoria remained involved in non-Labor politics, including financing by-election candidates and participating in the foundation of the Liberal Party of Australia.

The IPA Victoria was less involved in the 1949 federal election than the 1943 election, but the IPA Review did publish articles arguing against socialism and with tactical advice for the Liberal Party.

During Charles Kemp's time as director, the IPA Victoria focused its political engagement on the non-Labor parties, and did not "seriously attempt" to influence Labor politicians. Academic and public servant Finlay Crisp described it as a "satellite" of the Liberal Party during this time, and the IPA Review had a policy of not approaching Labor figures for submissions and of muting criticism of the Liberal government.

In 1978, the IPA and the Australian Council of Trade Unions prepared a booklet on partnership in industry, but the ACTU baulked at the association and its name was not on the final publication. By the 1980s, the IPA had changed its policy and made space in the IPA Review for Labor politicians and "others not of the free enterprise persuasion".

The institute has maintained close ideological and political affinities with the Liberal Party into the 21st century. IPA Executive Director John Roskam worked on the Liberal Party's election campaign during the 2001 federal election and has run for Liberal Party preselection. Tony Abbott delivered the 57th C D Kemp lecture in 2001 on the Coalition government's Work for the Dole program and Prime Minister John Howard delivered the 60th C D Kemp lecture in 2004, titled Iraq: The Importance of Seeing it Through. Howard has also said that its policies are influenced by the IPA, which "contributes very strongly to the intellectual debate on issues and that in turn has an impact on what attitude the Liberal Party takes".

== Research focus ==
Following the 2013 federal election of the Abbott Coalition government, the IPA released a list of 75 policy initiatives (later adding another 25) to "transform Australia" which encapsulated the present direction of the IPA.

The IPA is affiliated with the Atlas Network, a global umbrella organisation of free market think tanks.

=== Economics ===
The IPA Victoria's ideological position was initially "an amalgam of Keynesianism control and Hayekian regulation", with IPA President Eric Lampe in 1961 saying that the IPA considered government responsibility for full employment, social security, the speed of development, living standards and financial stability "all very necessary".

This changed during the late 1970s and 1980s, when the IPA adopted an economic rationalist or neo-liberal position, with the IPA saying in 1988 that:

the material condition of all sections of the community is most effectively enhanced by encouraging economic growth through a private enterprise, market-oriented economic system, involving vigorous private enterprise and minimal government interference

Recent economic positions of the IPA include:

- lower taxation;
- abolish the minimum wage
- deregulation of the Australian economy;
- privatisation of government bodies like Australia Post, Medicare, the SBS, the Australian Institute of Sport, the National Broadband Network, CSIRO and the ABC;
- reduced government spending;
- greater transparency in government;
- the elimination of existing programs of welfare targeted at Indigenous Australians, with the aim of encouraging transition to work, self-reliance and high incomes;
- maintain or increase the current level of immigration;
- the reduction of Australian Public Service benefits and allowances.

=== Tobacco ===
In the 1990s, the IPA was funded by the tobacco industry to conduct research that "attacked the science behind passive smoking". The research included a study from 1996 by John Luik that found that the impact of passive smoking on non-smokers was "trivial", and that "bogus" or "corrupt" passive smoking "threatens the central democratic values of autonomy, respect and diversity". In 2010, the IPA argued against the Gillard government's plans to introduce plain tobacco packaging, criticising it on the grounds that plain packaging may not affect the consumption of those products and that plain packaging may infringe intellectual property rights in tobacco trademarks and logos. If so, it would represent a breach of the constitutional requirement that acquisition be on just terms.

Policy director Tim Wilson predicted that the government could be liable for $3 billion in compensation, a claim that was criticised at the time by Media Watch in part because media covering Wilson's claims did not mention that the IPA receives donations from the tobacco industry. The High Court ultimately ruled that no compensation was required, in British American Tobacco Australasia Limited and Ors v. The Commonwealth of Australia.

Research in the decade after the policy was introduced, from Cancer Council Australia and the Australian Government found a significant decline in smoking prevalence in Australia, about a quarter of which was attributable to plain packaging.

=== Climate change ===
The IPA rejects the scientific consensus on the topic, i.e. that it is currently being mainly caused by human activities (in particular the burning of fossil fuels, leading to a build-up of greenhouse gases such as carbon dioxide), arguing that there is insufficient scientific evidence. It advocates that research in climate science should be more wide-ranging than overwhelmingly focused on attempting to prove that carbon dioxide is a dangerous climate-changing pollutant based on the inferences of hypothetical climate models. The IPA has financed several Australians who are contrarians or active in alternative climate change research.

In 2008, the institute facilitated a donation of A$350,000 by G. Bryant Macfie, a climate change denier, to the University of Queensland for environmental research. The money was given to fund three environmental doctoral projects, with the IPA suggesting two of the three agreed topics.

In 2010, the IPA published a compilation of essays by prominent climate change deniers titled Climate Change: The Facts and edited by John Roskam and Alan Moran. An expanded version with 22 essays was published in 2015 through Stockade Books and a follow-up edited by Jennifer Marohasy was published in 2017. In 2019 the IPA published an essay by Clive James, Chapter 22 of the 2017 publication, on its website, which was critical of what it called "climate change alarmism in the upmarket mass media".

In 2013, it was reported that several large multinational companies, including ExxonMobil, Shell and mining companies, had ceased their membership and financial contributions to the IPA, owing to its vehement campaign against climate change action.

In 2017, Marohasy and IPA colleague John Abbot published a paper on climate change in the journal GeoResJ, also discussing the work on the IPA website, in The Spectator Australia, and in Marohasy's blog. The research concludes that much of recent warming could be attributable to natural variations, and that the "world was about as warm in 1980 as it was during the Middle Ages". This conclusion was heavily criticised by climate scientists who pointed to methodological flaws in the research and declared it unworthy of publication. Gavin Schmidt, the director of NASA's Goddard Institute for Space Studies, has pointed out that some data were shifted in time by approximately 35 years, leading to the omission of warming that has occurred since 1965. Schmidt described the research as "worthless" and an example of "what happens when people have their conclusions fixed before they start the work".

== Notable people ==
The following individuals are or were associated with the Institute of Public Affairs.

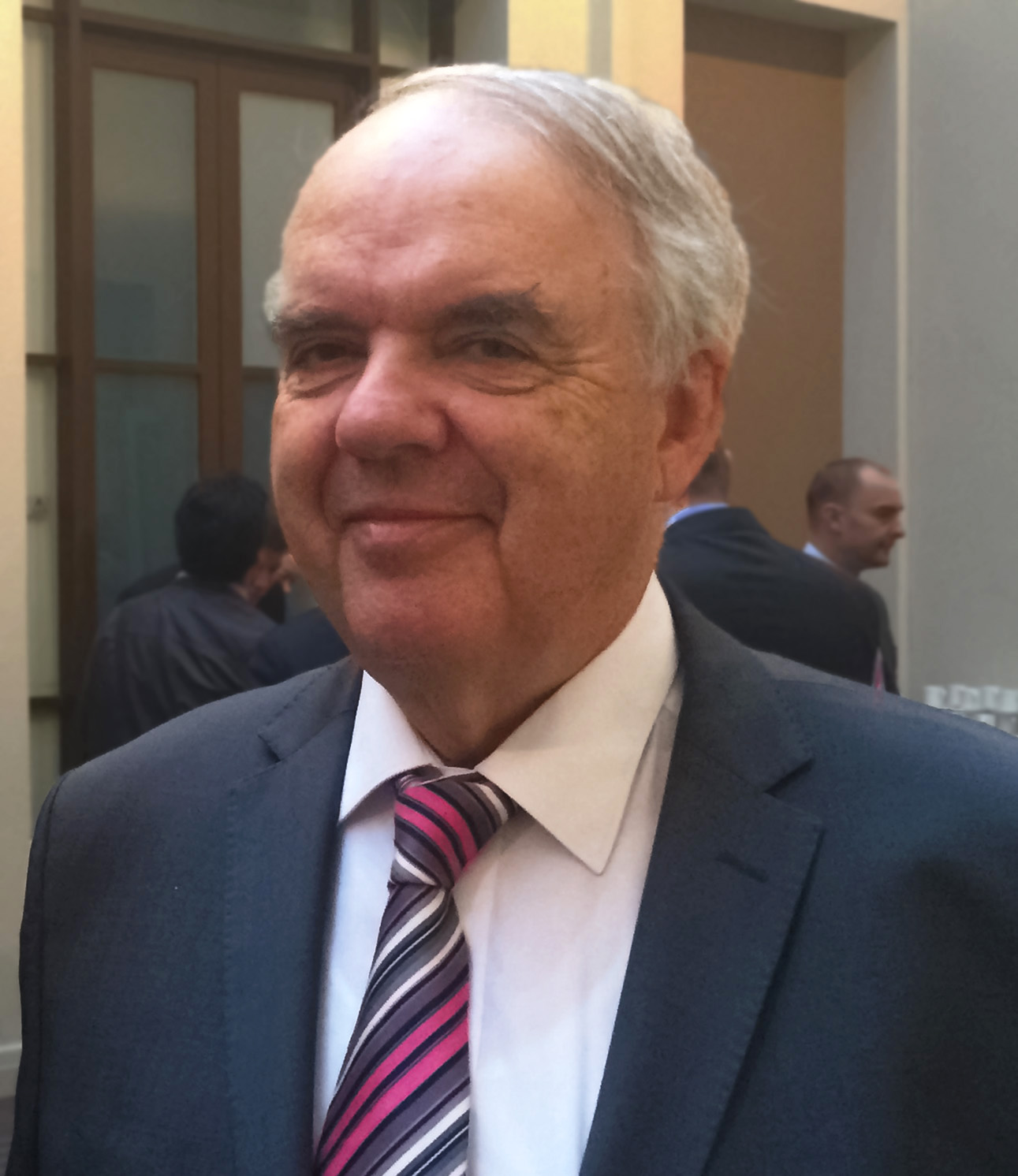
Rod Kemp

=== Senior office bearers ===
When the IPA Victoria was founded in 1943, it had a chairman (Sir George Coles); a chairman of the executive committee was chosen in 1944 (G. H. Grimwade) and a director (Charles Denton Kemp) in 1948. The executive committee was also referred to as the Industrial Committee or the Executive & Editorial Committee, and the role of chairman was subsequently renamed to president. From July 1983, the roles of president and chairman of the executive committee were combined.

Name	Title	Date appointed	Date ended	Term in office	Comments	Ref
Rod Kemp	(Executive) Director; Chairman	1982 (director); 2008 (chairman)	1989 (director); incumbent (chairman)	6–7 years (director); 17–18 years (chairman)	Former Australian Government minister, Australian Senator representing Victoria for the Liberal Party. Kemp's father, Charles Kemp, was a co-founder of the IPA.	
Mike Nahan	Executive director	1995	2005	9–10 years	Western Australia Liberal Party Leader and Leader of the Opposition until June 2019.	
John Roskam	Executive director	2004	incumbent	21–22 years	Former executive director of the Menzies Research Centre; former chief of staff for Liberal Minister David Kemp	
John Hyde	Executive director; Emeritus fellow	1991 (executive director); 1998 (emeritus fellow)	1995 (executive director); incumbent (emeritus fellow)	3–4 years (executive director); 27–28 years (emeritus fellow)	Economist; former Liberal member for Moore	
Charles Denton Kemp	(Executive) director	1948	1976	27–28 years	Economist and commentator; founder of the IPA; was also acting director between July 1979 and August 1982 when the position of director was vacant	
H.N. Warren	(Executive) director	1977	1978	0–1 years	Also served as Secretary of the IPA's Editorial Committee	
Roger Neave	(Executive) director	1978-02	1979	0–1 years	Scriptwriter; Rootes Group executive; deputy director of the IPA between 1976 and his appointment as director	
Katherine West	Unofficial (executive) director	1979-12	1980-02	0–1 years		
G.P. Hampel	(Executive) director	1981-01	1981-11	0 years		

=== Staff, fellows and board members ===
Name	Title	Date appointed	Date ended	Term in office	Comments	Ref
Janet Albrechtsen	Director		incumbent		Opinion writer for The Australian and a former director of the Australian Broadcasting Corporation	
Tony Abbott	Distinguished Fellow		incumbent		Former prime minister of Australia (28th) and former Federal Member for Warringah (1994–2019)	
Chris Berg	Adjunct Fellow	2004	2020		Columnist – Appointed term 2017–2020	
James Bolt	Digital communications manager		incumbent		Son of Andrew Bolt, an Australian conservative political commentator	
Father James Grant	Adjunct Fellow		incumbent		Catholic Priest and founder of Chaplains Without Borders, and Catholics in Business	
John Lloyd	Director of the Work Reform and Productivity Unit (former) Director of Workplace Relations (current)	Unknown (Work Reform) 2018 (Workplace Relations)	2014 (Work Reform) incumbent (Workplace Relations)		Former Australian Public Service Commissioner; former Australian Building and Construction Commissioner	
James Paterson	Deputy Executive Director	2014	2016		Australian Senator representing Victoria for the Liberal Party Since 2016	
David Penington					Former Vice-Chancellor of University of Melbourne	
Jason Potts	Adjunct Fellow		incumbent		Economist	
Tony Smith	Research Assistant	1989	1990	0–1 years	Liberal Party Member for Casey, Speaker of the House of Representatives from August 2015 to 2021	
Tom Switzer	Adjunct Fellow				Executive Director of the Centre for Independent Studies; former Senior Adviser to then Liberal Leader Brendan Nelson (2009)	
Tim Wilson	Policy Director	2007	2013	5–6 years	Former Liberal member for Goldstein (2016––2022); former Australian Human Rights Commissioner	
Morris Williams	Research Assistant	1947	1972	24–25 years	Liberal member for Box Hill (1973–1976) and Doncaster (1976–1988)	
Ian Plimer	Contributor, Climate Change: The Facts				Geologist, climate change denier	
Ken Ring	Contributor, Climate Change: The Facts				Writer, "alternative weather" predictor	
Evan Mulholland					Liberal member for the Victorian Legislative Council Since 2022	

=== Donors, members and associates ===
Name	Relationship to IPA	Comments	Ref
Gina Rinehart	Donor; Lifetime Member	Chairperson of Hancock Prospecting, prominent climate change denier	
David Leyonhjelm	Member	Former Australian Senator (2014–2019), representing himself and the Liberal Democratic Party	
Bob Day	Member	Former Australian Senator representing South Australia for the Family First Party (2014–2016)	
Kevan Gosper	Voting Member	Former Vice President of the International Olympic Committee; former chair and CEO of Royal Dutch Shell in Australia	

== Publications ==
The IPA Review is published quarterly.

== See also ==
- List of think tanks
