= Charles Kemp =

Charles Kemp may refer to:

- Charles Kemp (politician) (1813–1864), Australian politician
- Charles Kemp (English cricketer) (1856–1933), English first-class cricketer
- Charles Kemp (Australian cricketer) (1864–1940), Australian first-class cricketer
- Charles Denton Kemp (1911–1993), Australian economist and economic policy commentator
- Charles Eamer Kempe (1837–1907), English designer and manufacturer of stained glass
