= Emilie Dye =

American-born analyst, commentator and writer

Emilie Paige Dye is an American-born writer, policy commentator, and marketing and research analyst who has lived and worked in Australia. She is a spokesperson for Sydney YIMBY, a volunteer group advocating for increased housing supply. She previously worked as a Marketing and Research Analyst at the Centre for Independent Studies (CIS) and contributed commentary to Sky News Australia.

Dye has written on housing policy, taxation, corporate activism, and intergenerational inequality. She has also spoken publicly about sexual abuse in religious communities and workplace harassment in Australia, including a 2025 complaint to the Fair Work Commission involving the Centre for Independent Studies that received national media coverage.

== Early life and education ==
Dye was born in the United States and grew up in Idaho. She later earned a Bachelor of Science degree in Economics from George Washington University in Washington, D.C.

As a teenager, Dye attended Logos School in Moscow, Idaho, a classical Christian school founded by pastor Douglas Wilson and associated with Christ Church (Moscow, Idaho). Dye later left the Christ Church community and has spoken publicly about her experiences and about sexual abuse in religious communities. In an interview with The Wall Street Journal, Dye said that school officials had received several indications of abuse but did not adequately investigate the situation. Wilson has disputed allegations that church leaders attempted to conceal abuse, stating that a teacher was dismissed in 2014 for inappropriate behaviour and that church officials contacted police two years later after learning that the relationship may have been abusive. Dye told The Wall Street Journal that when police later contacted her she denied that abuse had occurred, which she attributed to feelings of culpability and fear of the consequences.

== Career ==
Dye moved to Australia and joined the Centre for Independent Studies in Sydney as a Marketing and Research Analyst in the Intergenerational Program. She has published reports on including housing affordability taxation and "bracket creep", and corporate political activism.

Her commentary has opposed quotas on the number of immigrants to Australia and criticised what she saw as restrictive border policies.

=== Fair Work Commission case ===
In July 2025, Dye filed an application with the Fair Work Commission alleging sexual harassment by Tom Switzer, then executive director of the Centre for Independent Studies, as well as retaliatory action by the organisation after she refused to sign a non-disclosure agreement.

Dye alleged that during a night out after a CIS event, Switzer "rubbed her leg", told her she had a "great arse", described himself as "a very sexual guy" during a night out in March 2025, and asked intrusive personal questions including whether she had "ever been with a woman" and whether she "liked threesomes". Dye stated she repeatedly told him he was her boss and that his conduct was inappropriate.

Switzer denied the allegations and has said that CCTV footage from the venue would show "nothing untoward". Reporting by the Sydney Morning Herald revealed that Dye was never informed of the footage's existence, despite CIS staff and Switzer viewing it shortly after the incident.

Dye further alleged that CIS engaged in retaliatory conduct after she refused to sign a non-disclosure agreement, including launching an internal investigation into her own workplace behaviour.

CIS initially stated it had responded appropriately and resisted calls to dismiss Switzer. However, on 2 September 2025, the Centre for Independent Studies announced that Switzer had resigned from all roles at the organisation, effective immediately, citing the pressure created by ongoing Fair Work Commission proceedings and the associated media coverage. On 5 September 2025, the organisation issued a joint statement apologising to Dye after the parties reached a resolution in the proceedings before the Fair Work Commission. The Australian Financial Review reported that the payout and legal costs associated with resolving the dispute cost the Centre for Independent Studies approximately $500,000.
