= The Sydney Institute =

Australian public affairs forum

- Formation: 1989
- Type: Public affairs forum
- Headquarters: 41 Phillip Street, Sydney, New South Wales, Australia
- Location: Sydney
- Executive Director: Gerard Henderson
- Website: The Sydney Institute

The Sydney Institute is a privately funded Australian policy forum founded on the 23 of August, 1989. The institute took over the resources of the New South Wales division of the Institute of Public Affairs.

Columnist and writer Gerard Henderson is the executive director of the institute. His wife, Anne Henderson, who is also an author, is the deputy director.

The Sydney Institute has been described as a "right-aligned policy think tank", comparable to organizations such as the American Enterprise Institute and the Manhattan Institute.

Gerard and Anne Henderson had previously run the South Australian branch of the Institute of Public Affairs, and run foul of the state Minister for Health who banned cigarette advertising. He branded South Australia as the "nanny state".

The couple then shifted to Sydney where they set up the IPA's New South Wales branch.

However, the Centre for International Studies had shared publishing resources and a territorial agreement with the Melbourne-based Institute of Public Affairs not to infringe on each other's sources of corporate donations, so the Hendersons created their own institute, and Philip Morris was happy to contribute to both. All these organisations are part of the Atlas Network.

== Key figures ==
The institute has cited the following key figures in the organization:

- Jacquelynne Willcox - Chair
- Amy Menere - Deputy Chair
- Simon Edwards - Treasurer
- Louise Clegg - Board Member
- Joe Gersh AM - Board Member
- George Karagiannakis - Board Member
- Nicholas Johnson - Board Member
- Carmel Mulhearn - Board Member
- Katherine O'Regan - Board Member
- Tony Warren - Board Member
- Mike Zorbas - Board Member

== See also ==
- Menzies Research Centre
