= Cormack Foundation =

Australian investment company

Cormack Foundation Pty. Ltd. is an Australian investment company established to hold for the Liberal Party of Australia (Victorian Division) and associated entities. Named in honour of former Senate President Magnus Cormack, the company was set up in 1988 with the proceeds of $15 million from the sale of former Melbourne radio station 3XY, the broadcast licence of which had been originally licensed to Liberal Party precursor the United Australia Party. 3XY was sold in 1986 for $15.75 million.

As of 2018, the Cormack Foundation is worth $70 million and has distributed over $40 million to the Liberal Party since it was founded. The Cormack Foundation is typically the largest single donor to the Liberal Party, but it has also contributed to Family First and the Liberal Democratic Party and right-wing think tanks the Centre for Independent Studies and the Institute of Public Affairs. Donations to the Liberal Democrats angered the Victorian Liberal Party as the Liberal Democrats preferenced against the Liberal Party in the 2016 Federal Election in the marginal seats of Dunkley and La Trobe and preferenced Cathy McGowan in Indi ahead of the Liberal Party.

== Political contributions ==
The Cormack Foundation is registered as an "associated entity" of the Liberal Party with the Australian Electoral Commission.

In 2014–15, it had receipts of A$5,403,207, which were marked as "other receipts", indicating that the receipts are not subject to the tax deductibility limits for political donations.

== Administration ==
The Cormack Foundation's founding directors were Stanley Guilfoyle (husband of Senator Margaret Guilfoyle), Hugh Morgan and John Calvert-Jones each of whom held 33 shares. Morgan and Calvert-Jones signed formal Undertakings saying that they held their shares of behalf of the Liberal Party. The Undertakings also provided that in the event that the directors issued new shares any new shareholder would be asked to sign a similar undertaking to ensure that the Liberal Party kept control of Cormack. Over time, the Cormack Foundation appointed other directors, including long-standing director Charles Goode, and issued shares to them - without including the requirement to benefit the Liberal Party. Accordingly, and as the Federal Court held in 2018 the issue of the new shares resulted in the Liberal Party ownership of Cormack being diluted from 66 of 99 shares when it was incorporated in 1988 to 66 of 264 shares at present. The Directors have never explained why they did this nor have they resigned as the Liberal Party has requested they do.

The Victorian Liberal Party first lost control of Cormack in 2000 when 33 shares were issued to Charles Goode making the total number of shares on issue 132 being the 66 held on trust for the Party by Morgan and Calvert-Jones and the 66 that were not then held by Guilfoyle and Goode as to 33 shares each. A problem arose in the Federal Court proceedings in that Charles Goode admitted before Justice Beach that he had a conflict of interest when he took his shares in 2000. This arose because at that time Goode was also a Trustee of the Liberal Party in Victoria but took the 33 shares in his own personal name instead of on trust for the Liberal Party branch members. Goode admitted in court he hadn't given thought to the conflict issue when he received his shares and on reflection wouldn't have taken them in his own name if confronted with the same question now. However, despite admitting the conflict of interest Goode has not resigned as Chairman of Cormack nor has he handed his shares back to the Party.

Although part of the Cormack Foundation is held on trust for the Liberal Party, its shareholdings have not been disclosed in the party's financial accounts.

In 2016, the Cormack Foundation made donations to non-Liberal parties (Family First and the Liberal Democrats), and froze donations to the Victorian branch of the Liberal Party because the branch had threatened legal action against Cormack.

In 2015, the newly elected President Michael Kroger uncovered a theft of $1.5m by the then State Director Damien Mantach which had gone undetected for four years by the Party's Administrative Committee, State Finance Committee and auditors. Two Cormack Directors Charles Goode and John Calvert-Jones were members of the Finance Committee for the entirety of the Mantach fraud (2011 - 2014) but failed to notice the theft occurring. They later resigned from the committee.

Following their failure to notice the fraud and following Cormack's decision to give money to the Liberal Democrats at the 2016 Federal Election directors Goode and Calvert-Jones and Hugh Morgan were asked to confirm that they held their shares on trust for the Liberal Party. They refused to give such acknowledgment. Over a 30-year period the Cormack Directors diluted the Liberal Party's ownership without the approval of the Liberal Party ultimately taking ownership of these funds for themselves.

In return, the Victorian branch of the Liberal Party - at the behest of its then-president Michael Kroger - sued the Cormack Foundation in November 2017, arguing that its funds belonged to the Liberal Party. Morgan and Calvert-Jones had already resigned as directors and cancelled their shares, but were still named in the proceedings.

In June 2018, the Federal Court of Australia agreed with the Liberal Party's submission that Morgan and Calvert-Jones had held their shares on trust for the Liberal Party because they'd signed formal undertakings to that effect, and therefore instead of being cancelled those shares must be transferred to Liberal Party nominees. In Court, Counsel for Morgan and Calvert-Jones tried to argue his clients were not bound by the Undertakings but the court rejected their argument. However, that only accounts for 25% of the current shares in the Cormack Foundation, even though when the Foundation was created in 1988 Morgan and Calvert-Jones had held two-thirds of the shares.

After the Federal Court ruling, the Cormack Foundation described the Liberal Party's victory as "Pyrrhic" while Kroger requested the Cormack Foundation's directors and shareholders to resign and relinquish their shares to the Liberal Party, threatening further legal action if they did not.

The dispute between the Victorian Liberal Party and Cormack looks set to continue for many years given that the Liberal Party was found by the Federal Court to have been the original owner of 66 of 99 shares. The Party maintains it has never sold any shares or authorised its dilution whereas the Cormack Directors have never explained why they diluted the Liberal Party's ownership of the shares or why Morgan and Calvert-Jones failed to use their best endeavours to have new shareholders sign an undertaking that they hold their shares on behalf of the Victorian Liberal Party.

== See also ==
- John Curtin House
- Political funding in Australia
- Campaign finance
