= Ian G. Enting =

- Born: 25 September 1948 (age 78); Victoria, Australia
- Education: Monash University
- Scientific career
- Fields: Mathematical physicist
- Workplaces: The University of Melbourne
- Doctoral advisor: H.C. Bolton
- Website: http://www.ms.unimelb.edu.au/~enting/

Ian Enting (born 25 September 1948) is a mathematical physicist and the AMSI/MASCOS Professorial Fellow at the ARC Centre of Excellence for Mathematics and Statistics of Complex Systems (MASCOS) based at The University of Melbourne.

Enting is the author of Twisted, The Distorted Mathematics of Greenhouse Denial in which he analyses the presentation and use of data by climate change deniers. In the book, Enting contends there are contradictions in their various arguments. The author also presents calculations of the actual emission levels that would be required to stabilise CO_{2} concentrations. This is an update of calculations that he contributed to the pre-Kyoto IPCC report on Radiative Forcing of Climate.

More recently he has been addressing the claims made in Ian Plimer's book Heaven and Earth. He has published a critique, "Ian Plimer’s ‘Heaven + Earth’ — Checking the Claims", listing what Enting claims are numerous misrepresentations of the sources cited in the book.

From 1980 to 2004 he worked in CSIRO Atmospheric Research, primarily on modelling the global carbon cycle.

He was one of the lead authors of the chapter CO_{2} and the Carbon Cycle in the 1994 IPCC report on Radiative Forcing of Climate.

Enting has published scientific papers, on mathematical physics and carbon cycle modelling, and a monograph on mathematical techniques for interpreting observations of carbon dioxide (CO_{2}) and other trace gases.
