= Heaven and Earth (book) =

2009 book by Ian Plimer

Heaven and Earth: Global Warming – The Missing Science
- Book cover (2009)
- Author: Ian Plimer
- Language: English
- Subject: Global warming
- Publisher: Connor Court Publishing
- Publication date: May 2009
- Publication place: Australia
- Media type: Print
- Pages: 504
- ISBN: 0-7043-7166-9
- OCLC: 316432445
- Preceded by: A Short History of Planet Earth

Heaven and Earth: Global Warming – The Missing Science is a popular science book published in 2009 and written by Australian geologist, professor of mining geology at the University of Adelaide, and mining company director Ian Plimer. It disputes the scientific consensus on climate change, including the view that global warming is "very likely due to the observed increase in anthropogenic (man-made) greenhouse gas concentrations" and asserts that the debate is being driven by what the author regards as irrational and unscientific elements.

The book received what The Age newspaper called "glowing endorsements" from the conservative press. The Australian said it gave "all the scientific ammunition climate change skeptics could want." Other reviewers criticised the book as unscientific, inaccurate, based on obsolete research, and internally inconsistent. Ideas in it have been described as "so wrong as to be laughable".

Heaven and Earth was a bestseller in Australia when published in May 2009, and is in its seventh printing, according to the publisher. The book has also been published in the United States and the United Kingdom.

== Background ==
Heaven and Earth is a sequel to a previous work by Plimer called A Short History of Planet Earth. Published in 2001, A Short History was based on a decade's worth of radio broadcasts by Plimer aimed mainly at rural Australians. It became a bestseller and won a Eureka Prize in 2002. However, Plimer was unable to find any major publisher willing to publish his follow-up book. He attributed this to there being "a lot of fear out there. No one wants to go against the popular paradigm." Plimer turned to Connor Court Publishing. The company has a history of publishing books on "culture, justice and religion", including many books on Christianity and Catholicism in particular. It has also published fellow Australian climate change skeptic Garth Paltridge's book, The Climate Caper, which likewise criticises the climate change consensus and the "politicisation of science". Crikey, an Australian webzine, commented that the publication of Heaven and Earth was a coup for conservatives, and said of the publisher: "The conservatives have a new friend in publishing".

According to Plimer, he wrote Heaven and Earth after being "incensed by increasing public acceptance of the idea that humans have caused global warming" and set out to "knock out every single argument we hear about climate change." Although he does not dispute that climate change is happening, he argues that "It's got nothing to do with the atmosphere, it's about what happens in the galaxy" and that climate is driven by the sun, the Earth's orbit and plate tectonics rather than the levels of atmospheric greenhouse gases such as carbon dioxide. Plimer says his book is for the "average punter in the street" who can "smell something is wrong in the climate debate but can't put a finger on what."

Critics have regularly questioned Plimer about his commercial interests in the mining industry, but he defends the independence of his views, saying that these commercial interests do not colour his arguments, which he claims are based on pure science. Critics note that Plimer has opposed a carbon trading scheme in Australia, saying that "it would probably destroy [the mining industry] totally".

== Synopsis ==
In the book, Plimer likens the concept of human-induced climate change to creationism and claims that it is a "fundamentalist religion adopted by urban atheists looking to fill a yawning spiritual gap plaguing the West". Environmental groups are claimed to have filled this gap by having a romantic view of a less developed past. The book is critical of the Intergovernmental Panel on Climate Change (IPCC), which he claims has allowed "little or no geological, archeological or historical input" in its analyses. If it had, the book asserts, the IPCC would know cold times lead to dwindling populations, social disruption, extinction, disease and catastrophic droughts, while warm times lead to life blossoming and economic booms – suggesting that global warming, whether or not caused by humans, should be welcomed.

The book is critical of political efforts to address climate change and argues that extreme environmental changes are inevitable and unavoidable. Meteorologists have a huge amount to gain from climate change research, the book claims, and they have narrowed the climate change debate to the atmosphere, whereas the truth is more complex. Money would be better directed to dealing with problems as they occur rather than making expensive and futile attempts to prevent climate change.

The book differs from the scientific consensus in contending that the Great Barrier Reef will benefit from rising seas, that there is no correlation between carbon dioxide levels and temperature, and that 98% of the greenhouse effect is due to water vapour.

In the book, Plimer claims that the scientific consensus on human-induced global warming is not in accord with history, archaeology, geology or astronomy and must be rejected, that promotion of this theory as science is fraudulent, and that the current alarm over climate change is the result of bad science. He argues that climate models focus too strongly on the effects of carbon dioxide, rather than factoring in other issues such as solar variation, the effect of clouds, and unreliable temperature measurements.

== Reception and criticism ==
Heaven and Earth received substantial coverage in the Australian and international media. It produced a highly polarised response from reviewers, with members of the conservative press praising the book and many scientists criticising it. A Wall Street Journal columnist called the book "a damning critique" of the theory of man-made global warming, while the Guardian writer and activist George Monbiot listed some of the book's errors with the comment: "Seldom has a book been more cleanly murdered by scientists than Ian Plimer's Heaven and Earth, which purports to show that manmade climate change is nonsense. Since its publication in Australia it has been ridiculed for a hilarious series of schoolboy errors, and its fudging and manipulation of the data."

=== Reactions from scientists ===
Canadian broadcaster John Moore said it was "widely criticised by fellow scientists as just another collection of denier hits." The Adelaide Advertiser stated that among other scientists, "Plimer is all but out in the cold".

Barry Brook of Adelaide University's Research Institute for Climate Change and Sustainability, who is at the same university as Plimer and has debated climate change issues with him, described the book as a case study "in how not to be objective" and accused Plimer of using "selective evidence". Brook said that Plimer's "stated view of climate science is that a vast number of extremely well respected scientists and a whole range of specialist disciplines have fallen prey to delusional self-interest and become nothing more than unthinking ideologues. Plausible to conspiracy theorists, perhaps, but hardly a sane world view, and insulting to all those genuinely committed to real science." He said that Plimer's assertions about man's role in climate change were "naive, reflected a poor understanding of climate science, and relied on recycled and distorted arguments that had been repeatedly refuted." Brook also suggested that many of the scientific authors cited by Plimer actually support the consensus view and that their work is misrepresented in Plimer's book. Susannah Eliott, the chief executive of the Australian Science Media Centre, encouraged colleagues to read the book and comment on it, but took the view that "there isn't anything new in there, they are all old arguments".

Many reviewers highlighted factual and sourcing problems in Heaven and Earth. Colin Woodroffe, a coastal geomorphologist at the University of Wollongong, and a lead chapter author for the IPCC AR4, wrote that the book has many errors and will be "remembered for the confrontation it provokes rather than the science it stimulates." Woodroffe noted Plimer's "unbalanced approach to the topic," and concluded that the book was not written as a contribution to any scientific debate, and was evidently not aimed at a scientific audience. Charlie Veron, former chief scientist at the Australian Institute of Marine Science, said every original statement Plimer makes in the book on coral and coral reefs is incorrect, and that Plimer "serve[s] up diagrams from no acknowledged source, diagrams known to be obsolete and diagrams that combine bits of science with bits of fiction."

David Karoly, an atmospheric dynamicist at Melbourne University and a lead author for the IPCC, accused Plimer of misusing data in the book and commented that "it doesn't support the answers with sources." Karoly reviewed the book and concluded: "Given the errors, the non-science, and the nonsense in this book, it should be classified as science fiction in any library that wastes its funds buying it. The book can then be placed on the shelves alongside Michael Crichton's State of Fear, another science fiction book about climate change with many footnotes. The only difference is that there are fewer scientific errors in State of Fear."

Ian G. Enting, a mathematical physicist at MASCOS, University of Melbourne and author of Twisted, The Distorted Mathematics of Greenhouse Denial, similarly criticised what he described as numerous misrepresentations of the sources cited in the book and charged that Plimer "fails to establish his claim that the human influence on climate can be ignored, relative to natural variation." Enting compiled a list of over 100 errors in the book.

Michael Ashley, an astronomer at the University of New South Wales, criticised the book at length in a review for The Australian in which he characterised the book as "largely a collection of contrarian ideas and conspiracy theories that are rife in the blogosphere. The writing is rambling and repetitive; the arguments flawed and illogical." He accused Plimer of having "done an enormous disservice to science, and the dedicated scientists who are trying to understand climate and the influence of humans, by publishing this book. It is not "merely" atmospheric scientists that would have to be wrong for Plimer to be right. It would require a rewriting of biology, geology, physics, oceanography, astronomy and statistics. Plimer's book deserves to languish on the shelves along with similar pseudo-science such as the writings of Immanuel Velikovsky and Erich von Däniken."

Malcolm Walter, the Director of the Australian Centre for Astrobiology, University of New South Wales, commented on Plimer's "fallacious reasoning," noting the "blatant and fundamental contradictions" and inconsistencies in the book. Walter told ABC Radio National that Plimer's interpretation of the literature is confused and that Plimer "bit off more than he can chew." According to Walter, "reviewing this book has been an unpleasant experience for me. I have been a friendly colleague of Plimer's for 25 years or more. ... But..., in my opinion, he has done a disservice to science and to the community at large." On the same network, geophysicist Kurt Lambeck, currently president of the Australian Academy of Science, said that the book was "sloppy" and that it "is not a work of science; it is an opinion of an author who happens to be a scientist."

Chris Turney, a researcher of prehistoric climate changes, of the University of Exeter's Department of Geography, stated the book was "a cacophony of climate skeptic arguments that have been discredited by decades of research." He described the number of errors in the book as "disturbingly high": "statements that are at best ambiguous and in many cases plain wrong are repeated, figures purporting to demonstrate climate change is all natural are erroneous, time and spatial scales are mixed up ... the list goes on." Turney comments that Plimer "badly mistreats" the history of the development of climate science, "regurgitating" the fringe idea of global cooling to portray "recent concerns over warming [as] just another case of alarmism." He concludes that "Plimer's thesis of inaction is a course we follow at our peril."

Writing in Earth magazine, emeritus USGS geologist Terry Gerlach commented that the book "illustrates one of the pathways by which myths, misrepresentations and spurious information get injected into the climate change debate." He highlighted Plimer's inaccurate claims about volcanic emissions of carbon dioxide and noted that Plimer had failed to provide estimates of present-day global carbon dioxide emission rate from volcanoes. In Gerlach's view, this was ironic considering that the book professes to provide the "missing science" on climate change.

Retired meteorologist William Kininmonth, a long-standing opponent of the scientific consensus on climate change, supported the book in a commentary published in The Australian in which he wrote that "Plimer's authoritative book provides the excuse and impetus to re-examine the scientific fundamentals [of climate change]."

The scientists' criticisms were rejected by Plimer, who embarked on a lecture tour following the book's publication in a bid to lobby the Australian government to change its policies on climate change to reflect what he called "valid science". He said that he had predicted that "The science would not be discussed, there would be academic nit-picking and there would be vitriolic ad hominem attacks by pompous academics out of contact with the community" and asserted that "comments by critics suggest that few have actually read the book and every time there was a savage public personal attack, book sales rose."

=== Media reactions ===
Plimer's book has received "glowing endorsements in the conservative press" according to Adam Morton of The Age. Christopher Pearson, a columnist with the conservative broadsheet The Australian, served as master of ceremonies at the book's launch and hailed it as a "campaign document" for climate change skeptics that "contains all the scientific ammunition they could want, packed into 493 eloquent pages." Sydney Morning Herald conservative commentator Miranda Devine called the book "a comprehensive scientific refutation of the beliefs underpinning the idea of human-caused climate change" and wrote that "Plimer's book, accessible as it is to the layperson, will help redress the power imbalance between those who claim to own the knowledge and the rest of us."

Paul Sheehan, a conservative commentator from The Sydney Morning Herald, asserted that "Ian Plimer is not some isolated gadfly. He is a prize-winning scientist and professor." Sheehan continued, calling the book "an evidence-based attack on conformity and orthodoxy, including my own, and a reminder to respect informed dissent and beware of ideology subverting evidence." The Wall Street Journal's Kimberly Strassel called it "a damning critique" of the theory of man-made global warming and credited Plimer with sparking an "era of renewed enlightenment".

The Spectator, a conservative British magazine, made the book the cover story of its 11 July 2009 issue. In Canada, Rex Murphy of The Globe and Mail recommended Heaven and Earth as "a wonderfully comprehensive and fearless book." London-based banker Lakshman Menon wrote in the Leisure section of the Business Standard of India that "if [the book] kickstarts an honest debate about climate change, Heaven And Earth will have performed an important service."

Leigh Dayton, science writer for The Australian, expressed dismay at Plimer for having "boarded the denialist ark" and described his arguments, such as his claims that scientists had been playing along with the view of human-induced climate change "in order to keep the research dollars flowing", as "a load of old codswallop". Dayton criticised Plimer's "shaky assumptions" and "misinformation", describing his assertion that the IPCC's scientists "whip up scary agenda-driven scenarios" as "fanciful".

In The Times, Bob Ward called the book an angry, bitter and error-strewn polemic. He said that Plimer "uses geology as an excuse to conclude the opposite of mainstream climate science", and that it is "hard to work out how and why he managed to produce such a controversial and flawed account."

The Australian's coverage of Heaven and Earth attracted criticism from Robert Manne, a lecturer on politics at La Trobe University in Melbourne, who criticised the "gushing praise" given the book. Manne deplored the willingness of The Australian to "give books such as [Plimer's] the kind of enthusiastic welcome hundreds of others published in this country every year cannot dream of receiving", calling this "a grave intellectual, political and moral mistake". Similarly, George Monbiot criticised The Spectator for featuring Heaven and Earth as a cover story, calling it "one of the gravest misjudgments in journalism this year" since "a quick check would have shown that [the book is] utter nonsense".

Lawrence Solomon of Canada's Financial Post commented that "Thanks to Plimer, the press and politicians, Australia is likely to become the developed world’s third Denier Nation" behind the Czech Republic and the United States.

=== Other reactions ===
Václav Klaus, former president of the Czech Republic and an economist, recommended Heaven and Earth in a blurb on the dust jacket: "This is a very powerful, clear, understandable and extremely useful book." His endorsement was in response to Plimer's request for the backing of "the big guns", which Plimer asserts is indicative of "a great body of extremely clever and well-known people out there that do not agree with the Chicken Little arguments that are being put up."

George Pell, the Catholic Archbishop of Sydney, wrote in The Sunday Telegraph newspaper that Heaven and Earth was "likely to make a huge difference to public opinion" and defended Plimer from charges of being a climate change "denier" because "history shows the planet is dynamic and the climate is always changing." The Archbishop concluded that Plimer's evidence "shows the wheels are falling from the climate catastrophe bandwagon."

Former Australian Federal Representative and pro-mining politician Graeme Campbell has sought to use the book to get "the other side of the debate" on climate change into schools. In June 2009, Campbell gave copies of Heaven and Earth to every school in his home town of Kalgoorlie, Western Australia. Senator Steve Fielding of the conservative Family First Party has also stated that his views on climate change have been influenced by Plimer and his book.

Lyn Allison, leader of the Australian Democrats from 2004 to 2008, called Plimer the "pet denialist" of Rupert Murdoch's newspapers, and accused Plimer of "happily cashing in on his speaking tours and his book".

== See also ==
- Global warming controversy
- Global warming conspiracy theory
