= Gerard Henderson =

Australian author, columnist and political commentator

- Born: 1945 (age 80–81); Balwyn, Victoria, Australia
- Education: Xavier College; University of Melbourne
- Occupations: Author, columnist and political commentator
- Spouse: Anne Henderson
- Writing career
- Subjects: Politics, Culture & Media

Gerard Henderson (born 1945) is an Australian author, columnist and political commentator noted for his right-wing Catholic and conservative views. He founded and is the executive director of The Sydney Institute, a privately funded Australian current affairs forum.

== Education and earlier career ==
Henderson was educated at Melbourne's Catholic, Jesuit-run Xavier College, one of the city's elite private schools. He went on to study arts and law at the prestigious University of Melbourne during the second half of the 1960s. He later completed a PhD.

Henderson taught at the Tasmania and La Trobe universities before working for four years on the staff of Kevin Newman in the Fraser government. He moved to the Department of Industrial Relations in 1980; from 1984 to 1986 he was chief-of-staff to John Howard, during which time Howard was deputy leader, then leader, of the Liberal Party of Australia.

The Keating government appointed Henderson to the board of the Australia Foundation for Culture and the Humanities. Later, the Howard government appointed him to the Foreign Affairs Council. He was one of the people invited to Kevin Rudd's Australia 2020 Summit held in April 2008.

== Works ==
For several years, Henderson had a weekly column in The Sydney Morning Herald. He also writes "Media Watch Dog", a weekly compendium of media criticism, written from the perspective of a blue heeler named Nancy. In December 2013, his column moved to The Weekend Australian, which also carries Media Watch Dog.

He has written several books.

- Mr Santamaria and the Bishops (Hale & Iremonger, 1982; ISBN 9780868060590)
- Australian Answers (Random House Australia, 1990; ISBN 9780091699314)
- Gerard Henderson Scribbles On (Wilkinson Books, 1993; ISBN 9781863501323)
- Menzies' Child: The Liberal Party of Australia (HarperCollins, 1994; second edition 1998: ISBN 9780732259235)
- A Howard Government? Inside the Coalition (HarperCollins, 1995; ISBN 9780732256395)
- B. A. Santamaria (HarperCollins, 2005; ISBN 9780732264253)
- Santamaria: A Most Unusual Man (MUP, 2015; ISBN 9780522868586)
- Cardinal Pell, the Media Pile-On & Collective Guilt (Connor Court Publishing, 2021; ISBN 9781922449818)

== Media appearances ==
In 1994, Henderson profiled former prime minister Bob Hawke for the ABC TV program Four Corners. He was a regular political commentator on radio, and appeared occasionally on Insiders, another ABC TV program. In early 2020, Henderson was dropped from the show after new host David Speers reportedly wanted to try new conservative voices amid claims from sources in the ABC that Henderson failed to sufficiently engage with issues during panel discussions.

== Views ==
In 2006, Henderson said John Howard had lost the ongoing culture wars, writing, "In my view, there is only one area where the Coalition has failed to have a significant impact – namely, in what some have termed 'the culture wars'."

Henderson has supported the movement for Australia to become a republic.
