= John Roskam =

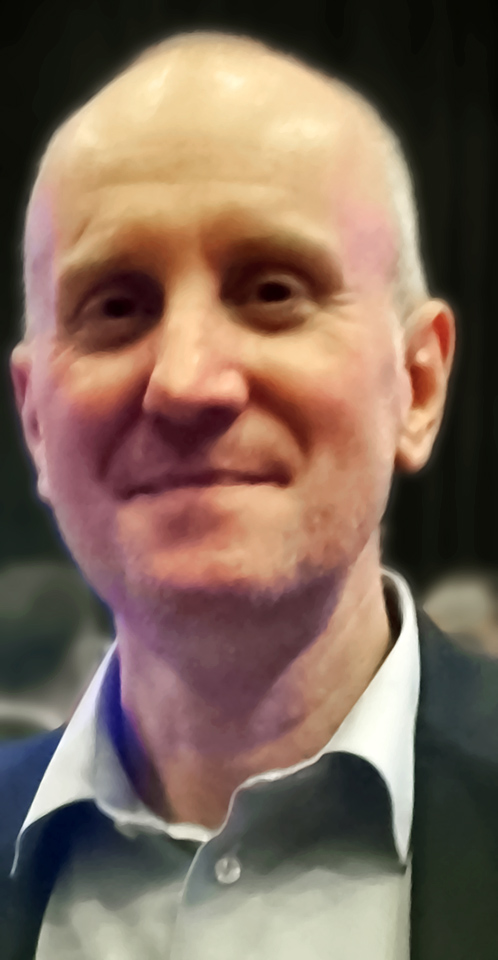
- Roskam in 2024

Personal details
- Party: Liberal Party

John Roskam is the former executive director and now senior fellow of the Institute of Public Affairs (IPA), a libertarian think tank based in Melbourne, Australia.

== Career ==
Roskam was educated at Xavier College and the University of Melbourne, where he graduated with a Bachelor of Commerce (Honours) and Bachelor of Laws (Honours) degrees.

According to Roskam's byline on an opinion column in the Australian Financial Review, "during the 2001 federal election he worked on the Liberals' federal campaign".

He has run for Liberal Party pre-selection and missed out a number of times.

Prior to his employment at the IPA, Roskam was the executive director of The Menzies Research Centre - a think tank for the Liberal Party - in Canberra.

He has also taught political theory at the University of Melbourne and held positions as Chief of Staff to Dr David Kemp, the Federal Minister for Employment, Education, Training and Youth Affairs, as Senior Advisor to Don Hayward, Victorian Minister for Education in the first Kennett Government, and as Manager of Government and Corporate Affairs for Rio Tinto Group.

With Gary Johns he has worked for the IPA, including on a contract with the federal government, to develop proposals to limit the role of nongovernmental organisations on public policy.

Despite positioning himself and the IPA as champions of free speech, Roskam fired Australian energy economist Alan Moran from the IPA for comments he made on Twitter in relation to Islam. The sacking was justified by Roskam having reference to the personal views of Moran, expressed publicly, on his personal Twitter account.

Moran's sacking followed shortly after Roskam also stood down IPA research fellow Aaron Lane for satirical comments he had made years earlier on a micro-blogging site prior to employment with the organisation. In spite of Lane's remarks preceding his relationship with the IPA and being completely unrelated to his employment, Roskam opined that "What he did is entirely inappropriate. It's wrong".

Roskam announced on 17 November 2021 that he would resign as executive director of the IPA in June 2022. He also announced he would continue work to at the IPA as a senior fellow and complete his "book on the enduring relevance of the work of George Orwell".

In April 2024, as a senior fellow, Roskam wrote an article in the AFR criticising the appointment of Sam Mostyn as governor-general of Australia.

In February 2026 he was announced as the next President of Campion College in Sydney.

== Notes ==
Non-profit organization positions
Preceded by Hon Dr Marlene Goldsmith	Executive Director of Menzies Research Centre; 2001-2002	Succeeded by Jason Bryant
Preceded by Mike Nahan	Executive Director of Institute of Public Affairs; 2005-present	Succeeded by incumbent
