= Chifley Research Centre =

Think tank of the Australian Labor Party

- Named after: Ben Chifley
- Formation: 1994; 32 years ago
- Type: Think tank
- Purpose: Public policy
- Location: Australia
- Executive Director: David Epstein
- Affiliations: Australian Labor Party
- Website: www.chifley.org.au

The Chifley Research Centre is the Australian Labor Party’s official think tank.

== Objectives and activities ==
=== Progressive Australia Conference ===
Progressive Australia is a bi-annual conference and series of events that the Centre has run since 2011, which aim to "renew Australia’s progressive values and to rebuild the progressive movement."

=== Labor History ===
Labor History is a project that the Centre runs, which "seeks to educate and engage the Australian people in the history and stories of the Australia Labor Party." This project is attempting to bring together the largest single resource on the ALP to help users gain an understanding of the ALP as a whole. It traces the history of the Australian Labor Party from its inception in the 1890s to the Hawke period of the 1990s. Users can also share their own stories and experiences to add to the collection and to stand as a testament to those who have contributed to the development of Australia.

== Funding ==
The Chifley Research Centre is supported by the Commonwealth Government through a grant in aid administered by the Department of Finance and Deregulation. It has Deductible Gift Recipient status under the Income Tax Act 1997.

== See also ==
- Liberal Party of Australia: Menzies Research Centre
- National Party of Australia: Page Research Centre
- Australian Democrats: Don Chipp Foundation
- Australian Greens: The Green Institute
