= The Green Institute =

Australian public policy think tank

- Formation: 2008; 18 years ago
- Founder: Margaret Blakers
- Type: Think tank
- Purpose: Public policy
- Location: Australia
- Director: Max Chandler-Mather
- Main organ: Green Agenda
- Affiliations: Australian Greens
- Website: www.greeninstitute.org.au

The Green Institute is an Australian public policy think tank founded in 2008. The institute "supports green politics through education, action, research and debate".

In disclosure returns lodged with the Australian Electoral Commission, the institute indicated that it is an associated entity of the Australian Greens. The institute is similar to the Liberal-aligned Menzies Research Centre and Labor's Chifley Research Centre.

== Activities ==
- Holding events to discuss issues within green politics.
- Publishing reports as well as "opinion pieces, blog posts, podcasts".
- Publishes the online quarterly Green Agenda.

In 2017, the Green Institute published a paper in favour of a universal basic income.

== Funding ==
The Green Institute is supported by the Commonwealth Government through a grant in aid administered by the Department of Finance.

== Directors ==
| No. | Portrait | Director (birth–death) | Term Start | Term End | Term Length | Ref |
|---|---|---|---|---|---|---|
| 1 | | Margaret Blakers OAM | 2008 | | | |
| | | Tim Hollo (born 1975) | January 2016 | October 2025 | 9 years, 9 months | |
| | | Max Chandler-Mather (born 1992) | April 2026 | Incumbent | 7 months | |

== See also ==
- Menzies Research Centre
- Chifley Research Centre
