= Greg Lindsay =

Australian think tank executive

Gregory John Lindsay AO (born 1949) is an Australian public speaker who was until 2018 the Executive Director of the Australian think tank the Centre for Independent Studies (CIS), which he founded in 1976 when a young mathematics teacher in the western suburbs of Sydney. CIS has become influential in Australia and New Zealand.

== Biography ==
Lindsay initially studied agricultural science at the University of Sydney, but found that this was not his real interest and instead obtained secondary teaching qualifications in mathematics at Sydney Teachers' College. A short four-year stint at Richmond High School coincided with further study at Macquarie University in philosophy culminating in graduating with a BA majoring in philosophy in 1977. The CIS's first public events were also held at Macquarie in October 1976 and in April 1977.

He was made an Officer of the Order of Australia (AO) in 2003 for his contribution to education and public debate.

In 2006 he was elected President of the Mont Pelerin Society for a two-year term at its general meeting in Guatemala. He was elected to the Council of Macquarie University for a term from 1 January 2008.
