= Centenary House =

Coordinates: 35.311°S 149.133°E

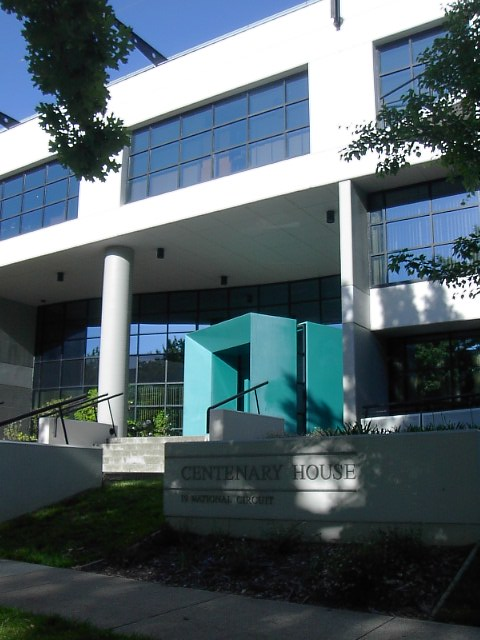
Centenary House, Canberra

Centenary House was a five-storey building in Canberra, Australia, and was located at 19 National Circuit, Barton.

It was the national headquarters of the Australian National Audit Office (usually known as the ANAO, a Commonwealth Government entity). The building was owned until July 2005 by John Curtin House Limited, an entity wholly owned by the ALP. The leasing of part of Centenary House to the ANAO was the subject of political controversy for more than ten years.

Centenary House was built in 1991 and the ALP (through Lend Lease, a property company) negotiated a lease with the ANAO. This lease began on 23 September 1993, for 15 years (that is, it is to conclude on 23 September 2008).

The total area that was leased was 6,297 square metres. In 1993, the rent to be charged was $367.95 per square metre. Due to a "ratchet clause", which specifies that the annual rent would increase by 9% or market rates (whichever is the greater), in 2004 the annual rent is $949.47. The current estimated market price in Canberra for rented space is $330.00.

The Federal Opposition (the Liberal-National Coalition at that time) demanded an enquiry to what they saw as a "rort" and the Keating ALP Government set up a Royal Commission.

The Royal Commission (headed by Trevor Morling QC) found that the rent charged "was a fair market rental for accommodation in a building such as Centenary House. This was supported by extensive market evidence and there is nothing to suggest that it was excessive". The ratchet clause was also found as justified because it was "well supported by historical rent movements" and that "the length of the term is not disadvantageous to the Commonwealth".

A second Royal Commission was appointed by the Howard government, and during 2004 Howard government ministers, particularly Tony Abbott, repeatedly accused the ALP of improperly profiting from the alleged "rort" of the lease. The Royal Commission reported in December 2004.

The report of the Royal Commissioner, Hon David Hunt, AO QC, found that the original inquiry was inadequate. It found that the rent was excessive and should not have been entered into by a prudent government. The report was critical of several public servants, but did not make any findings of corrupt conduct by John Curtin House Limited or the Australian Labor Party.

In July 2005, the ALP National Secretary, Tim Gartrell, announced that the building had been sold for more than $30 million.

In November 2021 Centenary House was demolished. It is to be replaced with a six-storey office building.
