= Janet Albrechtsen =

Australian journalist and columnist (born 1966)

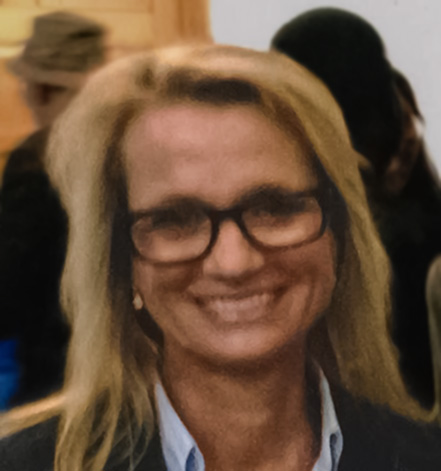
- Albrechtsen in 2013
- Born: Janet Kim Albrechtsen; 23 September 1966 (age 60); Adelaide, South Australia
- Education: University of Adelaide; University of Sydney
- Occupations: Journalist, columnist, critic
- Employer: News Corp Australia
- Spouse: John O'Sullivan (sep.)
- Children: 3

Janet Kim Albrechtsen (born 23 September 1966) is an Australian opinion columnist with The Australian. From 2005 until 2010, she was a member of the board of the Australian Broadcasting Corporation, Australia's public broadcaster.

== Early life and education ==
The adopted daughter of Danish immigrants to Australia, Albrechtsen was born in Adelaide and attended Seacombe High School. She subsequently studied at University of Adelaide, graduating with a Bachelor of Laws with Honours. She subsequently attained a Doctor of Juridical Science from the University of Sydney. Her thesis was titled The regulation of the fundraising process in Australia: searching for an optimal mix between legislative prescriptions and market forces.

== Career ==
Albrechtsen moved to Sydney to work as a commercial solicitor at Freehills. and taught at the University of Sydney Law School. Since turning to commentary, Albrechtsen has written for the Australian Financial Review, The Age, The Sydney Morning Herald, Quadrant, Canada's National Post, the Vancouver Sun, The Wall Street Journal and The Wall Street Journal Asia.

Albrechtsen was a member of the Foreign Affairs Council from 2003 until 2007.

Albrechtsen was appointed to the board of the Australian Broadcasting Corporation in 2005. She had previously derided the ABC as a "Soviet-style workers collective". She told reporters in late 2009 that she was planning to retire from the board, and completed her five-year term on 18 February 2010 without seeking reappointment. In 2014 it was reported that Albrechtsen was appointed to an independent nomination panel that advises the Minister for Communications on the short–listing of candidates for appointment to the ABC Board.

In 2008, Albrechtsen wrote the chapter "Romanticising Australian Conservatism" for Peter van Onselen's book Liberals and Power: The Road Ahead. She argued the Liberals have become preoccupied with "dominating the rational low ground", abandoning the high moral ground to the left.Australian academic Norman Abjorensen said he appreciated her view of Howard's legacy as not just a transformation of the Australian economy but also one of the Labor Party.

Albrechtsen conducted a lengthy interview series in 2014 with former Prime Minister of Australia John Howard, which aired as a featured story on Seven Network's Sunday Night, and again in January 2015 as its own five-part series on Sky News Australia entitled Howard Defined.

Albrechtsen was from 2014 until 2017 director and chair of the Audit, Finance and Risk Committee of the National Museum of Australia.

Janet Albrechtsen was appointed a director of the Institute of Public Affairs in 2016, and as chairman in July 2018, replacing Rod Kemp, a position held until November, 2019.

She is an ambassador for the Australian Indigenous Education Foundation.

== Commentary ==
Albrechtsen's political views can be described as libertarian, as expressed by the Institute of Public Affairs. These views are based around the dignity of the individual, freedom from government control and individual responsibility. She writes about the fiscal responsibility by government and the people, issues relating to political correctness, identity politics and modern day 'grievance feminism', the growing censorship on campuses, freedom of speech and the role of civil society.

== Personal life ==
Albrechtsen was married to lawyer John O'Sullivan, a friend of Malcolm Turnbull. They are now separated. The couple had three children, including Sascha O'Sullivan, who was also a journalist for The Australian.
