= Tasman Institute =

Australian think tank

The Tasman Institute was founded by Michael G. Porter in 1990 as a neoliberal think tank, based on his attempts in 1987 to establish a private university and his earlier think tank, the Centre of Policy Studies. During the 1990s, it became one of the three largest neo-liberal think tanks in Australia. Through its consultancy arm, Tasman Asia-Pacific, it advised Asia-Pacific and Eastern European countries on privatisation and deregulation, in what academic Damien Cahill identifies as a rare example of a think tank "that puts neo-liberal theory into practice".

The Tasman Institute consulted for the Greiner government in 1991 on the privatisation of Hunter Water.

With the libertarian think tank the Institute of Public Affairs, and funding from Victorian employer associations, the Tasman Institute prepared "Project Victoria" which proposed a neo-liberal program for the incoming Kennett government. The Tasman Institute was also awarded a government contract to consult on electricity privatisation in the state. Transport Minister Alan Brown would later describe the Tasman Institute as having a "profound effect" on government policy.

In 1995, the Tasman Institute and Tasman Asia-Pacific affiliated with the University of Melbourne.

== Mergers ==
In 2000, Tasman merged with the deregulation and privatisation consultancy London Economics (Australia), forming Tasman Economics.

In 2002, Tasman Economics merged with ACIL Consulting, forming ACIL Tasman. Tasman Institute founder Porter became the executive chair. London Economics founder and Tasman Economics CEO Nick Morris became the CEO of ACIL Tasman.

Nick Morris stepped down as CEO in October 2005 and left ACIL Tasman in February 2006.

== ACIL Tasman ==
ACIL Tasman merged with rival consultants Allen Consulting Group in 2013 to form ACIL Allen.

ACIL Consulting had operated for more than two decades covering key industries of energy, natural resources, agriculture and water.
