= Anne Henderson (author) =

Australian writer

Anne Henderson AM
- Born: Anne Elizabeth Keppel; 1949 (age 76–77); Melbourne, Victoria, Australia
- Education: Academy of Mary Immaculate
- Alma mater: University of Melbourne
- Spouse: Gerard Henderson
- Writing career
- Subject: Politics

Anne Elizabeth Henderson, AM (née Keppel; born 1949) is an Australian writer, deputy director of The Sydney Institute, editor of the institute's The Sydney Papers and co-editor of The Sydney Institute Quarterly.

Henderson was born in Melbourne and now lives in Sydney. She was educated at the University of Melbourne. Between 1971 and 1989 she worked as a teacher for seventeen years in several Australian states. She is married to Gerard Henderson, the executive director of the Sydney Institute.

== Literary career ==
Anne Henderson is the author of Getting Even: Women MPs on Life, Power and Politics , From All Corners: Six Migrant Stories, Educating Johannah: A Year in Year 12, and Mary MacKillop's Sisters: A Life Unveiled. She also authored Angel in the Court: The Life of Major Joyce Harmer, a biography of Joyce Harmer, Salvation Army major, social worker, court chaplain and advocate; and The Killing of Sister McCormack, a biographical work which covers the execution of Sister Irene McCormack.

Among Henderson's essays of note are "Dad's Wake" in Fathers: In Writing (Tuart Press, 1997) and the biographical chapter on Prime Minister Joseph Lyons for Australian Prime Ministers, edited by Michelle Grattan (New Holland 2000) and the UK's New Dictionary of National Biography (Oxford University Press). She was a contributing editor with Ross Fitzgerald of Partners (HarperCollins, 1999).

In 2008, Henderson published a biography of Dame Enid Lyons, titled Dame Enid Lyons: Leading Lady to a Nation. In 2011 her biography of Prime Minister Joseph Lyons, Joseph Lyons: The People’s Prime Minister (NewSouth Press), was launched by former prime minister John Howard. In 2014 Henderson published Menzies at War (NewSouth Press), which was shortlisted in the Prime Minister's Literary Award for History in 2015. Her 2023 book, Menzies Versus Evatt: The Great Rivalry of Australian Politics, was launched by Greg Sheridan at the Robert Menzies Institute.

Henderson also writes occasionally for The Australian, The Canberra Times, The Sydney Morning Herald, The Age, the Australian Book Review, and The Australian's Review of Books.

At the 2015 Australia Day Honours, Henderson was appointed a Member of the Order of Australia for significant service to literature in the field of political history, and to the community by fostering public debate and discussion.
