= Charles Goode =

Australian businessman

Charles Barrington Goode AC (born 26 August 1938) is an Australian director of public companies.

== Early life and education ==
Goode attended Scotch College, Melbourne and is a graduate of the University of Melbourne, where he was a resident of Ormond College, completing a Bachelor of Commerce (Hons). He also received an MBA and LLD (Hons) from that University and an LLD (Hons) from Monash University.

== Career ==
After an early career at the establishment stockbroking firm Potter Partners, he has had a long career as a director and Chairman of major public companies. His positions have included:

- Chairman of ANZ Bank (1995-2010)
- Chairman of Woodside Petroleum (1999-2007) (non-executive director since 1988)
- Director of Singapore Airlines (1999-2006)
- Chairman of Australian United Investment Company Limited
- Chairman of Diversified United Investment Limited
- Chairman of the Ian Potter Foundation
- President of the Howard Florey Institute of Experimental Physiology and Medicine (1997-2004; director since 1987)
- Chairman of the Cormack Foundation

== Honours ==
He became a Companion of the Order of Australia in 2001.

Business positions
Preceded by John Bernard Gough	Chairman of ANZ Banking Group; 1995 – 2010	Succeeded by John Morschel
