= John Curtin House =

Holding company owned by the Australian Labor Party

- Abbreviation: JCH
- Established: January 8, 1975; 51 years ago in Canberra, Australia
- Type: Investment company
- Location: Australia
- Secretary: Paul Erickson
- Board of directors: ALP National Executive
- Parent organization: Australian Labor Party
- Subsidiaries: John Curtin House Trust
- Revenue: Unknown
- Funding: Unknown

John Curtin House Limited is a Canberra-based holding company owned by the Australian Labor Party (ALP), named after John Curtin House, a building in Barton, Canberra which was the former headquarters of the Australian Labor Party (ALP). The building is in turn named after the former Labor Prime Minister (1941–1945), John Curtin.

== History ==
John Curtin House Limited (JCH) was founded and incorporated by the Australian Labor Party in 1975 and primarily exists as a property investment firm, deriving much of its income from property sub-leases. It also derives income from fees imposed on elected ALP parliamentarians through "software levies."

From 1992 to 2005, John Curtin House Limited was involved in a controversial scheme where the Australian National Audit Office paid above-market rent for premises at Centenary House, at a profit to the Labor Party.

In 2002–2003, John Curtin House gave $1,235,000 to the Australian Labor Party, making it the ALP's single largest donor.

Critics say John Curtin House Limited exists as a front to hide the identities of donors to the Australian Labor Party.

== Regulatory compliance ==
John Curtin House Ltd is officially registered as an associated entity with the Australian Electoral Commission.

=== Electoral Commission reports ===
- AEC Compliance Review Report (2019–20) | Australian Electoral Commission Compliance Review Report, pursuant to section 316(2A) of the Commonwealth Electoral Act 1918, published November 2022
- Associated Entity Annual Returns: John Curtin House Limited | A register of annual returns submitted to the AEC from 1998–99

== See also ==
- Centenary House
- Cormack Foundation
- Political donations in Australia
- Campaign finance
