= Centre for Independent Studies =

Australian think tank

- Other name: CIS
- Founder: Greg Lindsay
- Established: 1976; 50 years ago
- Executive Director: Tom Switzer
- Address: 131 Macquarie Street, Sydney City
- Location: Sydney, New South Wales, Australia
- Website: www.cis.org.au

The Centre for Independent Studies (CIS) is an Australian think tank founded in 1976 by Greg Lindsay. The CIS specialises in public policy research and publishes material in areas such as economics, education, culture and foreign policy. Although there are no explicit ties between the CIS and the centre-right Liberal Party, the CIS is politically aligned with the Liberal Party, praising Liberal Party founder Robert Menzies, hosting various Liberal Party politicians and holding very critical views of the Labor Party.

== Philosophy ==
The CIS describes itself as a "classical liberal think tank".

CIS is affiliated with the United States–based Atlas Network, which advocates free market economic policies across the world.

It has criticised some of the Liberal Party's policies.

== Sexual harassment controversy ==
In August 2025, the Sydney Morning Herald revealed that former Centre for Independent Studies (CIS) marketing and research analyst Emilie Dye had filed a complaint with the Fair Work Commission alleging that former executive director Tom Switzer had "rubbed her leg," told her she had a "great arse," described himself as "a very sexual guy" during a night out in March 2025, and proposed a threesome with another young female colleague.

Dye also alleged that CIS engaged in retaliatory conduct after she refused to sign a non-disclosure agreement, including launching an internal investigation into her own workplace behaviour. Switzer denied all allegations, claiming CCTV footage from the venue would clear him. However, a subsequent report revealed that Dye was never informed of the footage's existence, despite CIS staff and Switzer viewing it shortly after the incident.

Newly appointed executive director Michael Stutchbury initially resisted calls to dismiss Switzer, stating that CIS would await the outcome of the Fair Work Commission mediation process. Following mounting media scrutiny, criticism of CIS's handling of the complaint, and the withdrawal of the housing advocacy group Sydney YIMBY from a planned CIS event with NSW Premier Chris Minns, Stutchbury and the CIS board accepted Switzer's resignation on 2 September 2025.

On September 5, 2025, the Fair Work Commission case was resolved and CIS issued a joint statement which included an apology to Dye. The Australian Financial Review reported that the combined payout and legal costs associated with the dispute cost the organisation approximately $500,000.

=== Funding ===
The Centre for Independent Studies states that it is funded by donations, memberships, and event revenue and "does not accept government funding".

However, in 2020 the Sydney Morning Herald revealed that the Reserve Bank of Australia (RBA) had been paying $20,000 a year to the CIS and the Sydney Institute since the early 2000s to support public policy research and events. RBA governor Philip Lowe said the bank provided funding to independent, not-for-profit institutions contributing to policy debates relevant to its mandate, but critics argued the arrangement undermined the CIS's claim of avoiding government funding.

== Staff ==
Tom Switzer was executive director of CIS from 2018 to 2025, succeeding founder Greg Lindsay who had held the position for forty-two years. On September 1 2025 Switzer stepped down as a senior fellow after he was accused of sexually harassing a staff member. In 2019, Nicholas Moore was appointed chairman of the CIS board, succeeding Peter Mason.

Notable individuals in the research staff include Steven Schwartz.
