= Garth Paltridge =

Australian atmospheric physicist

Garth William Paltridge
- Born: 24 April 1940 (age 86); Brisbane, Queensland
- Education: University of Queensland; University of Melbourne
- Known for: Maximum entropy production (MEP) hypothesis
- Scientific career
- Fields: Atmospheric sciences
- Workplaces: University of Tasmania; Australian National University
- Thesis: Analytical and experimental investigations of the electrical parameters of the stratosphere (1965)

Garth William Paltridge (24 April 1940 - 1 May 2026) was an Australian atmospheric physicist. He was a visiting fellow at the Australian National University and emeritus professor and honorary research fellow at the Institute of Antarctic and Southern Oceans Studies (IASOS), University of Tasmania.

== Career ==
Paltridge obtained a BSc in 1961 from the University of Queensland, a PhD in 1965 from University of Melbourne and a DSc in 1976 from the University of Queensland. He worked as a postdoctoral fellow at the New Mexico Institute of Mining and Technology in 1966, then as senior research scientist for the Radio and Space Research Station at Ditton Park, Buckinghamshire, England, from 1967–1968. In 1968 he took up a role as research scientist at the CSIRO, Australia, where he remained until 1981. During that time he worked briefly as a consultant to the World Meteorological Organization in 1975 in Geneva, Switzerland, where he was involved in the early development of the World Climate Program, and in 1979 he was posted as senior visiting scientist at the U.S. National Oceanic and Atmospheric Administration (NOAA). He was elected as a fellow of the Australian Academy of Science in 1980. In 1981 he was seconded as director of the Environmental Executive of the Institute of Petroleum, and in 1982 he returned to the CSIRO as chief research scientist, where he remained until 1989. He briefly served as senior visiting scientist at the National Climate Program Office from 1989–1990. From 1990 to 2002 he was professor and director of the Institute of Antarctic and Southern Oceans Studies at the University of Tasmania and at the same time, from 1991–2002, he was the chief executive officer of the Antarctic Co-operative Research Centre at the University of Tasmania.

Paltridge was involved in studies on stratospheric electricity, the effect of the atmosphere on plant growth and the radiation properties of clouds. Paltridge researched topics such as the optimum design of plants and the economics of climate forecasting, and worked on atmospheric radiation and the theoretical basis of climate. Paltridge introduced the subsequently disputed hypothesis that the earth/atmosphere climate system adopts a format that maximises its rate of thermodynamic dissipation, i.e., entropy production. This suggests a governing constraint by a principle of maximum rate of entropy production. According to this principle, prediction of the broad-scale steady-state distribution of cloud, temperature and energy flows in the ocean and atmosphere may be possible when one has sufficient data about the system for that purpose, but does not have fully detailed data about every variable of the system. As co-author with C.M.R. Platt, in 1976 Paltridge published a textbook entitled Radiative Processes in Meteorology and Climatology.

== Views on climate change ==
In August 2009 he published a book on the global warming debate, The Climate Caper. Paltridge agrees with the scientific consensus on climate change that anthropogenic global warming is real, but disagrees with mainstream scientific opinion in that he thinks that the warming will probably be too small to be a threat.

== Selected publications ==
- Paltridge, G. W., Global dynamics and climate––A system of minimum entropy exchange, Q. J. R. Meteorol. Soc., 101, 475–484, 1975.
- Paltridge, G. W. and C. M. R. Platt, Radiative Processes in Meteorology and Climatology, Developments in Atmospheric Sciences, vol. 5, Elsevier Scientific Publishing Company, Amsterdam, Oxford, New York, 1976, ISBN 0-444-41444-4.
- Paltridge, G. W., The steady-state format of global climate, Q. J. R. Meteorol. Soc., 104, 927–945, 1978.
- Paltridge, G. W., Climate and thermodynamic systems of maximum dissipation, Nature, 279, 630–631, 1979.
- Paltridge, G. W., Thermodynamic dissipation and the global climate system, Q. J. R. Meteorol. Soc., 107, 531–547, 1981.
- Paltridge, G. W., A physical basis for a maximum of thermodynamic dissipation of the climate system, Q. J. R. Meteorol. Soc., 127, 305–313, 2001.
- Paltridge, G. W., "Stumbling into the MEP Racket: An Historical Perspective", in A. Kleidon and R. D. Lorenz [eds.], Non-equilibrium Thermodynamics and the Production of Entropy: life, earth, and beyond, Springer, 2005, 33–40, ISBN 3-540-22495-5.
- Paltridge, G. W., G. D. Farquhar, and M. Cuntz, Maximum entropy production, cloud feedback, and climate change, Geophys. Res. Lett., 34, L14708, 2007.
- Paltridge, G. W, A. Arking and M. Pook, Trends in middle- and upper-level tropospheric humidity from NCEP reanalysis data, Theor. Appl. Climatol., 98, 351–359, 2009.
- Paltridge, G. W., The Climate Caper: Facts and Fallacies of Global Warming, Connor Court Publishing, Ballan, 2009, ISBN 978-1-921421-25-9.
