= Ken Phillips =

Australian rules footballer

Personal information
- Full name: Kenneth Frank Phillips
- Born: 23 September 1943
- Died: 4 June 1995 (aged 51)
- Original team: East Burwood
- Height: 178 cm (5 ft 10 in)
- Weight: 74 kg (163 lb)
- Position: Wing

Playing career^{1}
| Years | Club | Games (Goals) |
| 1963–64, 1966–69 | South Melbourne | 60 (28) |
- ^{1} Playing statistics correct to the end of 1969.

Kenneth Frank Phillips (23 September 1943 – 4 June 1995) was an Australian rules footballer who played with South Melbourne in the Victorian Football League (VFL).
