= Charles Kemp (Australian cricketer) =

Australian cricketer

Personal information
- Full name: Benjamin Charles Ernest Kemp
- Born: 30 January 1864; Plymouth, England
- Died: 3 December 1940 (aged 76); Melbourne, Australia
- Batting: Left-handed
- Bowling: Slow left-arm orthodox

Domestic team information
- Years: Team
- 1884/85–1887/88: South Australia
- 1891/92–1897/98: Victoria
- Source: Cricinfo, 26 July 2015

Charles Kemp (30 January 1864 – 3 December 1940) was an Australian cricketer. He played six first-class cricket matches between 1885 and 1898, four for South Australia and two for Victoria. He also played district cricket for South Melbourne.

== See also ==
- List of Victoria first-class cricketers
