= David Kemp (politician) =

Australian politician (born 1941)

The Honourable David Kemp AC
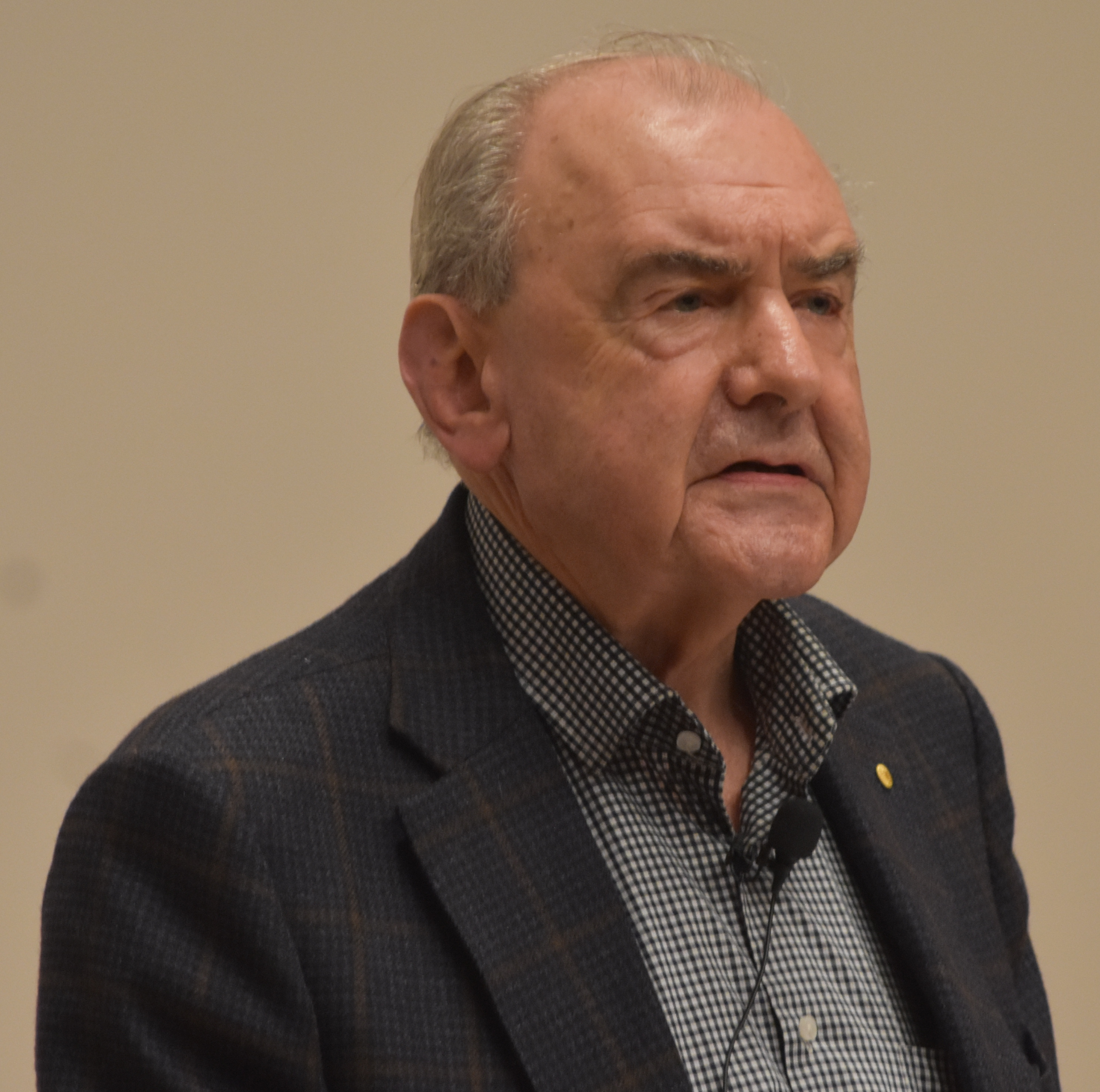
- Kemp in 2025 at Trinity College

Minister for the Environment & Heritage
- In office 26 November 2001 – 18 July 2004
- Prime Minister: John Howard
- Preceded by: Robert Hill
- Succeeded by: Ian Campbell

Vice-President of the Executive Council
- In office 21 October 1998 – 18 July 2004
- Prime Minister: John Howard
- Preceded by: John Moore
- Succeeded by: Nick Minchin

Minister for Schools, Vocational Education and Training
- In office 11 March 1996 – 26 November 2001
- Prime Minister: John Howard
- Preceded by: Simon Crean
- Succeeded by: Brendan Nelson

Member of the Australian Parliament for Goldstein
- In office 24 March 1990 – 31 August 2004
- Preceded by: Ian Macphee
- Succeeded by: Andrew Robb

Personal details
- Born: David Alistair Kemp; 14 October 1941 (age 85) Melbourne, Victoria, Australia
- Party: Liberal
- Relations: Rod Kemp (brother)
- Education: University of Melbourne; Yale University
- Occupation: Lecturer

David Alistair Kemp AC (born 14 October 1941) is a retired Australian politician. He was a Liberal member of the Australian House of Representatives from 1990 to 2004, representing the Division of Goldstein, Victoria. He was also a Cabinet member in the Howard government.

== Early life and education ==
Kemp was born in Melbourne, Victoria, and was educated at the University of Melbourne and Yale University, where he gained a doctoral degree in politics. He is the brother of Senator Rod Kemp, and the son of Charles Denton Kemp, founder of the Institute of Public Affairs.

== Career ==
Kemp was Senior Lecturer in Political Science at the University of Melbourne 1975–79 and Professor of Politics at Monash University, Melbourne 1979–90. He is the author of Society and Electoral Behaviour in Australia: a Study of Three Decades (1978), Malcolm Fraser on Australia (with D. M. White) (1986), Current Priorities for Liberalism (1986) and Foundations for Australian Political Analysis: Politics and Authority (1988).

=== Political career ===
Kemp was Senior Adviser to Malcolm Fraser, Leader of the Opposition and Prime Minister 1975–76 and Director of the Prime Minister's Office 1981.

In 1990 Kemp challenged Liberal MP and former Cabinet minister, Ian Macphee, for Liberal endorsement in the safe Melbourne seat of Goldstein. Kemp was seen as the candidate of the conservative wing of the Liberal Party, against a leading moderate liberal figure. Kemp won the battle.

Kemp was a member of the Opposition Shadow Ministry 1990–96. He was Minister for Schools, Vocational Education and Training, Minister Assisting the Prime Minister for the Public Service and Minister Assisting the Minister for Finance for Privatisation 1996–97. He was promoted to Cabinet as Minister for Employment, Education, Training and Youth Affairs 1997–98 and Minister for Education, Training and Youth Affairs 1998–2001. He was Minister for Environment and Heritage from November 2001 to July 2004. He was Vice-President of the Executive Council from October 1998 to July 2004. His brother Rod was a fellow minister.

David Kemp retired at the 2004 election. He was succeeded as member for Goldstein by Andrew Robb.

In 2007, he was elected President of the Victorian Branch of the Liberal Party. He retired in 2011 and was replaced as Liberal state President by Tony Snell.

=== Post-political career ===
In 2012, Kemp became chairman of Scotch College, Melbourne. In 2017, Kemp was appointed a Companion of the Order of Australia for eminent service to the Parliament of Australia, notably in the areas of employment, education, training and youth affairs, to the environment, to institutional reform and public policy development, and to the community.

Political offices
Preceded by Ross Free	Minister for Schools, Vocational Education and Training; 1996–1997	Succeeded by Chris Ellison
Preceded by Amanda Vanstone	Minister for Employment, Education, Training and Youth Affairs; 1997–1998	Succeeded by Peter Reith
New title	Minister for Education, Training and Youth Affairs; 1998–2001	Succeeded by Brendan Nelson
Preceded by John Moore	Vice-President of the Executive Council; 1998–2004	Succeeded by Nick Minchin
Preceded by Robert Hill	Minister for Environment and Heritage; 2001–2004	Succeeded by Ian Campbell
Parliament of Australia
Preceded by Ian Macphee	Member for Goldstein; 1990–2004	Succeeded by Andrew Robb
