= Rod Kemp =

Australian politician (born 1944)

The Honourable Rod Kemp
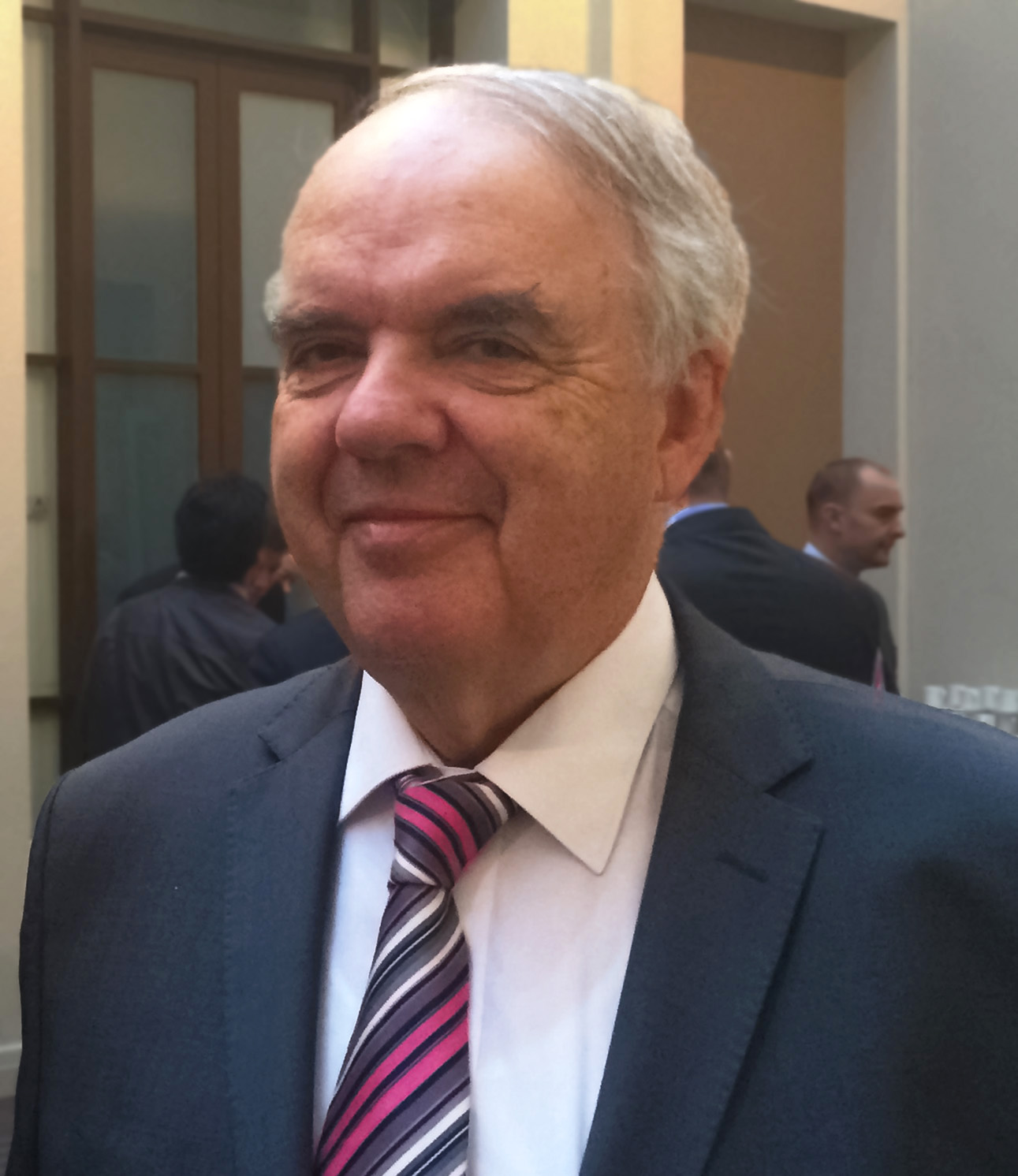

Senator for Victoria
- In office 1 July 1990 – 30 June 2008

Personal details
- Born: 21 December 1944 (age 81) Melbourne, Victoria
- Party: Liberal Party of Australia
- Awards: Member of the Order of Australia (2020)

Charles Roderick Kemp (born 21 December 1944) is an Australian politician. He was a Liberal member of the Australian Senate from 1990 to 2008, representing the state of Victoria.

Kemp was born in Melbourne, Victoria, and was educated at Melbourne University, where he graduated in commerce. He is the brother of David Kemp, who was a Liberal MP from 1990 to 2004.

Before entering politics, Kemp was Director of the Institute of Public Affairs, a conservative policy body founded by his father, C.D. Kemp. He was senior private secretary to Dame Margaret Guilfoyle from 1977 to 1982 and principal adviser to the Leader of the Opposition, Andrew Peacock, in 1989.

Kemp was elected as a Liberal Senator at the 1990 election and took his seat in July 1990. He was a member of the Opposition Shadow Ministry from 1992 to 1996, Parliamentary Secretary to the Minister for Social Security in 1996, Assistant Treasurer from 1996 to 2001, and Minister for the Arts and Sport from November 2001 to January 2007.

His brother David was a fellow minister.

On 12 May, Rod Kemp announced he would not contest the November 2007 election, and duly left parliament at the expiration of his term in June 2008.

Kemp was appointed a Member of the Order of Australia in the 2020 Australia Day Honours.

== Publications ==
Rod Kemp and Marion Stanton (eds), Speaking for Australia: Parliamentary speeches that shaped our nation, Alen & Unwin, 2004.

Political offices
Preceded by Jackie Kelly as Minister for Sport and Tourism	Minister for the Arts and Sport; 2001–2007	Succeeded by George Brandis
Preceded by Peter McGauran as Minister for the Arts and the Centenary of Federation	Minister for the Arts and Sport; 2001–2007	Succeeded by George Brandis
