= Theoretical and Applied Climatology =

- Discipline: Climatology, meteorology
- Language: English
- Edited by: Christian Bernhofer

Publication details
- Former name(s): Archives for Meteorology, Geophysics and Bioclimatology, Series B
- History: 1949-present
- Publisher: Springer Science+Business Media
- Frequency: Monthly
- Impact factor: 3.179 (2020)

Standard abbreviations
- ISO 4: Theor. Appl. Climatol.

Indexing
- CODEN: TACLEK
- ISSN: 0177-798X (print); 1434-4483 (web)
- LCCN: 98641633
- OCLC no.: 41248414

Links
- Journal homepage; Online archive

Theoretical and Applied Climatology is a monthly journal published by Springer Science+Business Media which focuses on atmospheric sciences and climatology. It was established in 1949 as Archives for Meteorology, Geophysics and Bioclimatology, Series B and obtained its current name in 1986. It is published by Springer Science+Business Media and the editor-in-chief is Hartmut Graßl. According to the Journal Citation Reports, the journal has a 2020 impact factor of 3.179.
