= Sydney YIMBY =

Advocacy group in Australia

- Founded: 2023
- Type: Non-profit
- Members: 315 (2025)
- Chair: Justin Simon
- Website: www.sydney.yimby.au

Sydney YIMBY is a group that advocates for greater housing supply in Sydney, New South Wales, Australia primarily through the aim of densification. The abbreviation YIMBY stands for yes in my backyard.

== History ==
Justin Simon started Sydney YIMBY out of the frustration that a development near a light rail station in Leichhardt got blocked. The group had about 12 members when their first meeting occurred but that number has risen to 315 as of June 2025. Proponents of the movement include Sydney-based content creator Sharath Mehendran — who runs YouTube channel Building Beautifully — who has publicly expressed support for "building up, not out".

In September 2025, the group supported a proposal by Inner West Council to rezone the areas of Ashfield, Croydon, Dulwich Hill and Marrickville to allow for high-density residential buildings such as apartments that are up to 22 storeys high. The plan will allow for 31,000 new homes over 15 years.

== Functions ==
The organisation grew out of a perceived need for more housing in Sydney and to counteract the power of NIMBYs (not in my backyard). Sydney YIMBY primarily advocates for their cause through arguments at council meetings and local events when new developments are proposed. The organisation is inspired by similar groups operating in the United States. Members of Sydney YIMBY advocate for more risk-taking in terms of council decisions and increased flexibility rather than "sticking to the letter" of current urban development trends which encourage low-density, car-centric infrastructure.

The organisation is in favour of creating more houses close to public transport stops. Sydney YIMBY also advocates for reforms to heritage law.

The Sydney YIMBY movement aims to bring down high housing prices with increased supply of housing.
