= Menzies Research Centre =

Australian public policy think tank

- Named after: Robert Menzies
- Formation: 1994; 32 years ago
- Type: Think tank
- Purpose: Public policy
- Location: Australia
- Chair: Paul Espie AO
- Executive director: David Hughes
- Affiliations: Liberal Party
- Website: www.menziesrc.org

The Menzies Research Centre (MRC) is the think tank of the Liberal Party of Australia. Founded in 1994 and named after Sir Robert Menzies, founder of the Liberal Party and Australia's longest-serving prime minister, the Centre conducts public policy research, publishes books, and hosts events.

It is led by Executive Director David Hughes.

== History ==
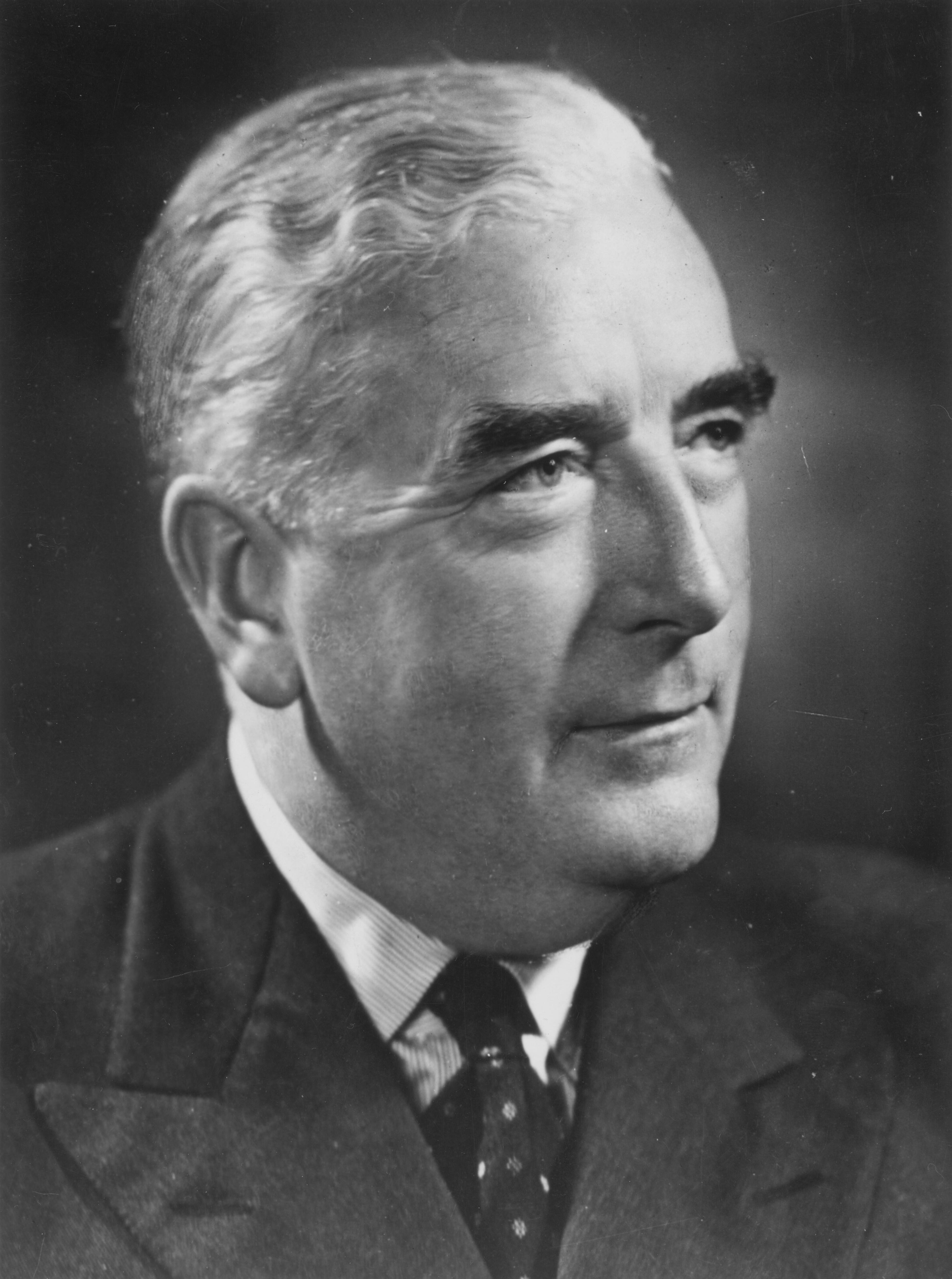
Robert Menzies

The Menzies Research Centre was founded in 1994, during the centenary year of Robert Menzies' birth. Andrew Robb, who later served as Federal Minister for Trade and Investment, was a founding director and has remained on the board since its establishment.

=== Funding ===
The Centre receives partial funding from the federal government through the Finance Department's Grants-in-Aid program, which supports think tanks affiliated with political parties. The Chifley Research Centre (Labor), the Page Research Centre (Nationals), and the Green Institute (Greens) receive funding through the same program. The MRC is one of only seven organisations named in the Income Tax Assessment Act 1997 as a tax-deductible gift recipient.

== Activities ==
The Centre hosts public events including the annual John Howard Lecture, publishes books and monographs on policy and Liberal history, and conducts research on economic, regulatory, energy, and migration policy.

=== Justice and Integrity Program ===
The Centre runs a Justice and Integrity Program focused on litigation funding reform and judicial accountability. The MRC made a submission to the 2020 Parliamentary Joint Committee Inquiry into Litigation Funding, advocating for litigation funders to be required to hold an Australian Financial Services Licence. James Mathias, then Chief of Staff at the MRC and later Executive Director of the H. R. Nicholls Society, appeared before the inquiry on behalf of the Centre, where the submission's methodology was challenged. Herbert Smith Freehills clarified that data attributed to the firm had been taken from an informal overview rather than an empirical analysis.

The Centre also submitted to the Australian Law Reform Commission's Inquiry into Judicial Impartiality in 2021. The ALRC declined to publish the submission, stating on external legal advice that it contained defamatory material. Then Executive Director Nick Cater rejected the ALRC's assessment, stating the MRC 'emphatically reject the assertion' and described the decision as censorship. The Commission's final report recommended that Commonwealth courts develop policies on statistical analysis of judicial decision-making, a position the MRC had advocated for.

=== Robert Menzies Institute ===
In 2021, the Centre partnered with the University of Melbourne to establish the Robert Menzies Institute, a prime ministerial library and museum housed in the university's Old Quad. The federal government provided $7 million in funding for the project. The institute's establishment was met with protests from students and academics who raised concerns about the Liberal Party's influence on campus and questioned whether the arrangement preserved academic freedom.

=== Centre for Youth Policy ===
In 2023, the Centre established the Centre for Youth Policy, led by Freya Leach. The program focuses on developing policy for young Australians and promoting Liberal values to a younger generation.

== Governance ==
The Centre has been led by a series of executive directors including its first, Michael L'Estrange (1995–1997), Hon Dr Marlene Goldsmith (1998–2000), John Roskam (2001–2002), Jason Briant (2003–05), Julian Leeser (2006–2012), Professor Don Markwell(2012–13), Nick Cater (2014–2023), and David Hughes (March 2023–present).

The Centre's board has included a number of prominent figures in Liberal politics and Australian business. Malcolm Turnbull served as chair from 2002 to 2004 and was the Centre's largest individual donor before entering parliament as the Member for Wentworth in 2004. Former Liberal Party Federal Director Brian Loughnane has been a director since 2018 and became chair in December 2023. Other notable directors have included former Senator Nick Minchin, former South Australian Premier John Olsen, and former Federal Trade Minister Andrew Robb.

=== Board Chairs ===
Name	Dates	Comments
David S. Clarke AO	1994–1997	Co-founder and Executive Chairman of Macquarie Bank
Hon Andrew Robb MP	1998–2004	Founding director of MRC; later Federal Minister for Trade and Investment
Hon Malcolm Turnbull MP	2002–2004	Later Prime Minister of Australia; was MRC's largest individual donor, donating $150,000 in 2001/02
Tom Harley	c. 2004–c. 2017	Great-grandson of Alfred Deakin; former BHP Billiton executive; Federal Vice-President of the Liberal Party
Kevin McCann AO	c. 2017–c. 2019	Chairman of Macquarie Group
Paul Espie AO	c. 2018–2023	Founding principal of Pacific Road Capital; Chairman of Empire Energy Group
Brian Loughnane	2023–Present	Federal Director of the Liberal Party 2003–2016

== See also ==
- Australian Labor Party: Chifley Research Centre
- National Party of Australia: Page Research Centre
- Australian Greens Party The Green Institute
