= Tom Switzer =

Australian political writer

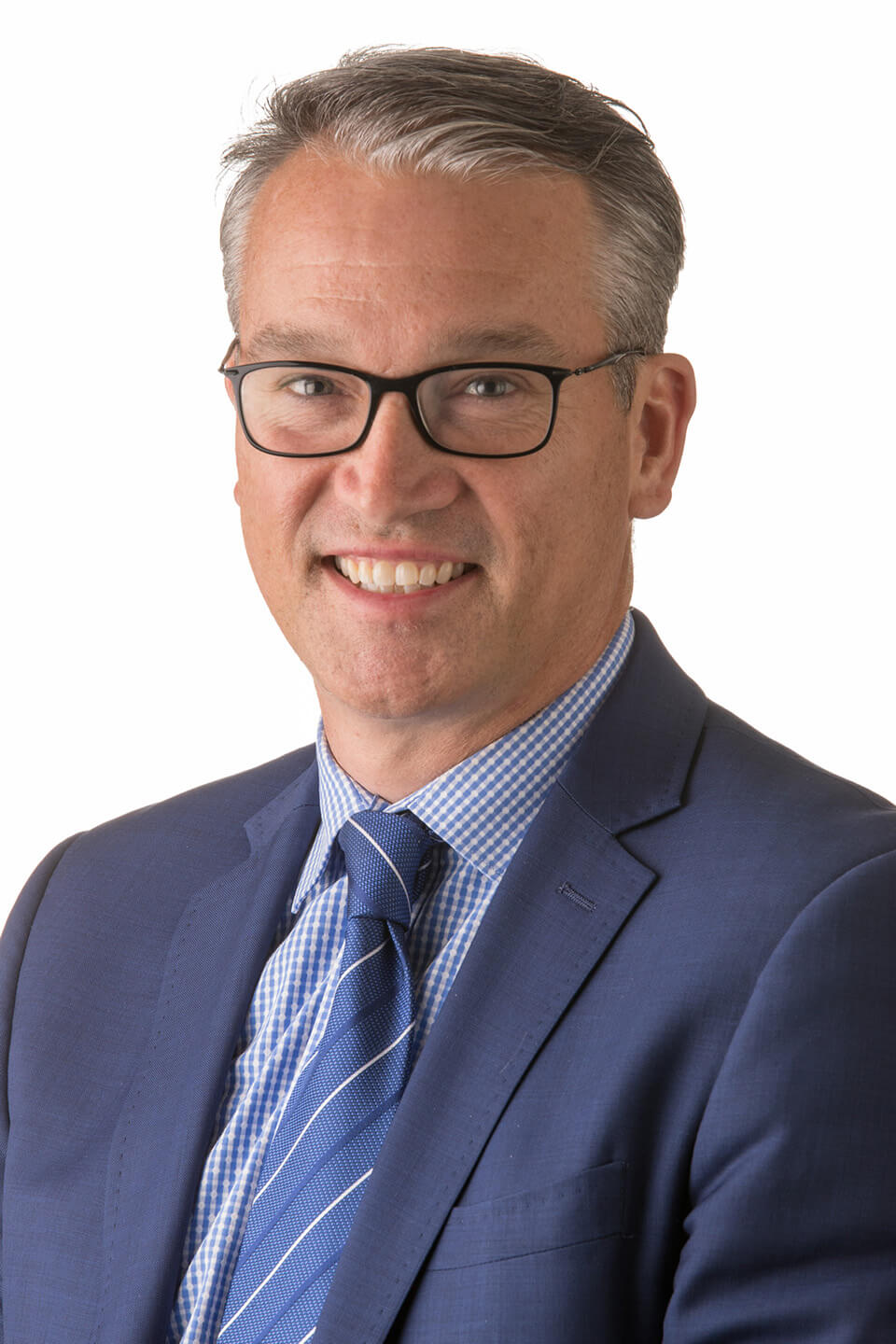
- Citizenship: Australian
- Education: St. Aloysius College, University of Sydney
- Occupations: Journalist, academic
- Years active: 1995 -- Present
- Spouse: Sarah Switzer

Tom Switzer (/ˈswɪtsər/; born 1971) is an Australian political writer and presenter of Switzerland, a podcast on politics, modern history and international relations. He is a regular contributor to The Australian and panelist at Sky News Australia and a former columnist at the Sydney Morning Herald and Australian Financial Review. From 2017 to 2025, Switzer was executive director of the Centre for Independent Studies, a Sydney-based public-policy organisation.

== Early life and education ==
Switzer was born in 1971 in Dallas, Texas, and grew up in Sydney. He attended St Aloysius' College, Kirribilli, where he was an Australian schools U.19 800 metres track and field champion in 1989, (with a U.18 personal best of 1.52.6s) and was trained by Australian Olympic coach Jackie Byrnes. He graduated with a Bachelor of Arts in History (First Class Honours) in 1993; and a Masters in International Relations in 1994; both from the University of Sydney.

== Career ==
Journalism

Switzer was a presenter at the Australian Broadcasting Corporation's Radio National (2014–23), editor of The Spectator Australia (2009–2014), opinion editor for The Australian (2001–2008), editorial writer at the Australian Financial Review (1998–2001) and assistant editor at the American Enterprise Institute in Washington, D.C. (1995–1998).

The Australian

During his tenure at The Australian, Switzer gave the opinion pages a more right-wing ideological bent. Among the columnists he hired was Janet Albrechtsen.

In 2005, writing in The Monthly, leading Melbourne academic Robert Manne credited Switzer for allowing diversity of political opinion in the newspaper’s opinion sections during the U.S.-led war on Iraq, which The Australian’s editorials strongly supported. Switzer had personally opposed the war.

Writings

Switzer's writings have been published in international media, including The Wall Street Journal, the New York Times and Foreign Affairs magazine. Switzer is co-editor, with Sue Windybank, of Power and Prudence: The Writings of Owen Harries (Connor Court, 2022). During the 2000s and 2010s, Switzer and Harries, the Welsh-Australian conservative realist foreign-policy intellectual, co-wrote several articles, including the cover essay for The American Interest (May/June 2013), headlined “Leading from Behind: Third time a charm.”

Broadcast Journalism

From 2014 to 2023, Switzer presented several programs on the ABC’s Radio National, most notably Between the Lines, a weekly program on international relations. When the ABC announced the news of the show, Switzer responded to speculation that he’d pander to conservative listeners by telling The Australian, “it’s a serious public affairs program that tries to put contemporary events in a broader historical and international context, and we will focus on international relations, especially Australia’s place in the world.”

Switzer’s regular guests included former prime minister John Howard, University of Chicago political scientist Professor John Mearsheimer, and Stephen Cohen, a prominent historian of 20th century Russia and the Soviet Union from NYU and Princeton

In 2015, Switzer interviewed Nigel Lawson, Margaret Thatcher’s Chancellor of the Exchequer and a member of the House of Lords, about climate change and the economic costs of decarbonising the economy. According to The Guardian Australia, the episode “raised the ire of some experienced staffers at Radio National who believe Switzer’s friendly chat with the passionate climate change sceptic breached the ABC’s editorial policies.”

Since January 2026, Switzer has presented Switzerland, a regular YouTube program and podcast focusing on politics and international relations. Regular guests have included Professor John Mearsheimer, Harvard University professor Stephen Walt, Vali Nasr from Johns Hopkins SAIS, Trita Parsi from the Quincy Institute, and University of Oklahoma professor Joshua Landis.

Politics

In 2008, he was senior adviser to federal Liberal Party leader Brendan Nelson until the leadership spill that resulted in Nelson's defeat by Malcolm Turnbull. It was widely believed Switzer played a key role within the federal opposition to reject the Rudd government’s legislation to enact an emissions trading scheme.

In an opinion article on July 11, 2008, widely believed to be written by Switzer, the opposition leader Brendan Nelson backed away from the Coalition's support for a cap-and-trade policy to reduce carbon emissions, arguing that its implementation should be conditional on a legally binding global deal that was verifiable and enforceable.

Nelson’s position was repudiated by Turnbull before his successor Tony Abbott fully embraced it in 2009-10.

In 2009, after Nelson resigned from Parliament, Switzer was a candidate to replace him in his northern Sydney federal electorate of Bradfield. In the leadup to the by-election, he received endorsements from John Howard, Tony Abbott and Peter Costello and a dis-endorsement from former Labor prime minister Paul Keating, who said Switzer was a “monkey, who represented the jaundiced journalism that was part and parcel of the Howard years.” In a field of 18 candidates, Switzer was defeated in the fifth round, with Paul Fletcher selected as eventual candidate.

== Controversies ==
Resignation from the ABC

In November 2023, Tom Switzer resigned from the Australian Broadcasting Corporation, where he had presented several programs on ABC Radio National for more than a decade. According to a report in News Corp publications, Switzer’s decision to step down was “partly motivated by the pressure of being a ‘lone conservative’ at the public broadcaster.”

It was later reported that his resignation was primarily due to health reasons after he was diagnosed with cancer. A year later, Switzer wrote about his experience in an article reflecting on his diagnosis and the broader progress made in cancer treatment since Richard Nixon declared a “war on cancer” in the early 1970s.

Resignation from the Centre for Independent Studies

According to a report in The Sydney Morning Herald in August 2025, the Centre for Independent Studies became involved in a workplace dispute after a former employee lodged applications with the Fair Work Commission alleging sexual harassment by Switzer and claiming that, after she raised the complaint, the institute had launched an investigation into her alleged workplace harassment against another employee.

According to the filings, the complainant alleged that Switzer had rubbed her leg, commented on her appearance, and described himself as “a very sexual guy.” Switzer denied the allegations.

The owner of the restaurant where the alleged incident occurred stated that CCTV footage from the venue was “crystal clear: nothing happened.” It was also reported that the complainant had not been informed of the existence of the footage.

On 2 September 2025, the Centre for Independent Studies announced that Switzer had resigned as a senior fellow, citing the pressure created by ongoing Fair Work Commission proceedings and the associated media coverage. In February 2026, following a column by Switzer in The Australian criticising former prime minister Malcolm Turnbull, a gossip columnist in the Australian Financial Review alleged that the payout and legal costs associated with resolving the dispute had amounted to approximately $500,000.
