= Ian Plimer =

Australian geologist (born 1946)

- Born: 12 August 1946 (age 80)
- Education: University of New South Wales, Macquarie University
- Awards: Eureka Prize (1995, 2002), Centenary Medal (2003), Clarke Medal (2004)
- Scientific career
- Fields: Earth Science, Geology, Mining Engineering
- Workplaces: University of New England, University of Newcastle, University of Melbourne, University of Adelaide
- Thesis: The pipe deposits of tungsten-molybdenum-bismuth in eastern Australia (1973)

Ian Rutherford Plimer (born 12 February 1946) is an Australian geologist and professor emeritus at the University of Melbourne. He rejects the scientific consensus on climate change. He has been criticised by climate scientists for misinterpreting data and spreading misinformation.

Plimer previously worked as a professor of mining geology at the University of Adelaide, and the director of multiple mineral exploration and mining companies. He has also been a critic of creationism.

== Early life and education ==
Ian Plimer grew up in Sydney and attended Normanhurst Boys High School. He earned a BSc (Hons) in mining engineering at the University of New South Wales in 1968, and a PhD in Geology at Macquarie University in 1976. His doctoral thesis (from 1973) was titled, The pipe deposits of tungsten-molybdenum-bismuth in eastern Australia.

== Career ==
=== Academia ===
Plimer started as a tutor and senior tutor in earth sciences at Macquarie University from 1968 to 1973. After finishing his PhD, he became a lecturer in geology at the W.S. and L.B. Robinson University College of the University of New South Wales at Broken Hill from 1974 to 1979. Part of his work focused on the Broken Hill ore deposit—a large zinc-lead-silver mine in Australia. Plimer then went to work for North Broken Hill Ltd. between 1979 and 1982, becoming chief research geologist. Due to his publication of a number of academic papers, he was offered a job as senior lecturer in economic geology at the University of New England in 1982. After two years, he left to become a professor and head of geology at the University of Newcastle through 1991. Plimer later served as professor and head of geology of the School of Earth Sciences at the University of Melbourne from 1991 to 2005. He was conferred as professor emeritus of earth sciences at the University of Melbourne in 2005, and was a professor of mining geology at the University of Adelaide.

Plimer is a fellow of the Australian Academy of Technological Sciences and Engineering, the Australian Institute of Geoscientists and the Australasian Institute of Mining and Metallurgy; an honorary fellow of the Geological Society of London; a member of the Geological Society of Australia, the Royal Society of South Australia, and the Royal Society of New South Wales.

He co-edited the 2005 edition of Encyclopedia of Geology.

=== Mining companies ===
Plimer was non-executive director of CBH Resources Limited from 1998 to 2010, non-executive director of Angel Mining plc from 2003 to 2005, director of Kimberley Metals Limited from 2008 to 2009, director of KBL Mining Limited from 2008 to 2009 and director of Ormil Energy Limited from 2010 to 2011.

He is currently the non-executive deputy chairman of KEFI Minerals since 2006, independent non-executive director of Ivanhoe Australia Limited since 2007, chairman of TNT Mines Limited since 2010, non-executive director of Niuminco Group Limited (formerly DSF International Holdings Limited) since 2011, and non-executive director of Silver City Minerals Limited since 2011. Plimer was appointed director of Roy Hill Holdings and Queensland Coal Investments in 2012.

According to a columnist in The Age, Plimer earned over $400,000 (AUD) from several of these companies, and he has mining shares and options worth hundreds of thousands of Australian dollars. Plimer has stated that his business interests do not affect the independence of his beliefs. He has also warned that the proposed Australian carbon-trading scheme could decimate the Australian mining industry.

Plimer is an executive director of Hancock Energy, a subsidiary of Hancock Prospecting Pty Ltd.

== Views on climate change ==
He is a member of the academic advisory council for climate change denialist pressure group The Global Warming Policy Foundation, a member of Australians for Northern Development & Economic Vision (ANDEV), and was an allied expert for the Natural Resources Stewardship Project. Plimer is also a member of the Saltbush Club, a group that promotes climate change denial.

Plimer rejects the scientific consensus on climate change. He accuses the environmental movement of being irrational, and claims that the vast bulk of the scientific community, including most major scientific academies, is prejudiced by the prospect of research funding. He characterised the Intergovernmental Panel on Climate Change as: "The IPCC process is related to environmental activism, politics and opportunism" and "the IPCC process is unrelated to science". He is critical of greenhouse gas politics and says that extreme environmental changes are inevitable. Climatologists call his reasoning on climate change flawed, inaccurate and misleading and say he misrepresents their data.

=== Volcanoes and CO_{2} ===
Plimer has said that volcanic eruptions release more carbon dioxide (CO_{2}) than human activity; in particular that submarine volcanoes emit large amounts of CO_{2} and that the influence of the gases from these volcanoes on the Earth's climate is under-represented in climate models. The United States Geological Survey has calculated that human emissions of CO_{2} are about 130 times larger than volcanic emissions, including submarine emissions. The United States Environmental Protection Agency (EPA) stated that Plimer's claim "has no factual basis." This was confirmed in a 2011 survey published in the Eos journal of the American Geophysical Union, which found that anthropogenic emissions of CO_{2} are 135 times larger than those from all volcanoes on Earth.

=== Heaven and Earth ===
In 2009, Plimer released Heaven and Earth, a book in which he says that climate models focus too strongly on the effects of carbon dioxide, and do not give the weight he thinks is appropriate to other factors such as solar variation. The aim of the book is to belittle the impact of humans on Earth by clouting all the other science like a blunt instrument, as in Plimer's words "I wanted to kill an ant with a sledgehammer." Critics of the book have accused Plimer of misrepresenting sources, misusing data, and engaging in conspiracy theories. Some critics have also described the book as unscientific, and said that it contains numerous errors from which Plimer draws false conclusions.

=== Copenhagen Climate Challenge ===
During the United Nations Climate Change Conference 2009 (COP15), Plimer spoke at a rival conference in Copenhagen for climate change deniers, called the Copenhagen Climate Challenge, which was organised by the Committee for a Constructive Tomorrow. According to The Australian newspaper, Plimer was a star attraction of the two-day event. In closing his speech, Plimer stated that "They’ve got us outnumbered, but we’ve got them outgunned, and that’s with the truth."

=== El Niño, earthquakes and sea levels ===
Plimer has stated that El Niño is caused by earthquakes and volcanic activity at the mid-ocean ridges and that the melting of polar ice has nothing to do with man-made carbon dioxide. Plimer told Radio Australia that Pacific island nations are seeing changes in relative sea level not because of global warming but quite commonly due to other factors, such as "vibration consolidating the coral island sands", extraction of water, and extraction of sand for road and air strip making.

=== Political influence ===
In 2009, Plimer was cited by the leader of the Liberal Party of Australia, Tony Abbott, in dismissing the IPCC and its findings. But by 2011, Abbott had modified his position and stated that climate change is real and humanity makes a contribution to it.

In early 2010, Plimer toured Australia with British climate change denier Christopher Monckton, giving lectures on climate change, and Plimer's views came to be associated with Monckton's claim that the international left created the threat of catastrophic global warming. On this association, columnist Phillip Adams commented: "Praise the lord for Lord Monckton! For Ian Plimer! For [conservative columnist] Andrew Bolt! Not only does this evil axis of scientists tell lies [about the Greenhouse Effect] but they've also doctored the weather to frighten people with huge droughts, cyclones and tsunamis to prove what they now call 'global warming'." Plimer's book Not for Greens expanded his view. Climate scientist Ian McHugh has refuted a number of the scientific claims in the book.

In 2026 Primer contributed $500,000 to One Nation.

== Opposition to creationism ==
Plimer is an outspoken critic of creationism and is famous for a 1988 debate with creationist Duane Gish in which he asked his opponent to hold live electrical cables to prove that electromagnetism was 'only a theory'. Gish accused him of being theatrical, abusive and slanderous.

In 1990 Plimer's anti-creationist behaviour was criticised in Creation/Evolution journal, in an article titled "How Not to Argue with Creationists" by skeptic and anti-creationist Jim Lippard for (among other things) including false claims and errors, and "behaving poorly" in the 1988 Gish debate.

=== Book: Telling Lies for God ===
In his book Telling Lies for God: Reason vs Creationism (1994), Plimer attacked creationists in Australia, in specific the Queensland-based Creation Science Foundation (now called Creation Ministries International or CMI), saying that claims of a biblical global flood are untenable. In the book he also criticised aspects of traditional Christian belief and literal interpretations of the Bible, with chapters titled "Scientific Fraud: The Great Flood of Absurdities" and "Disinformation Doublespeak".

=== Court case against Allen Roberts ===
In the late 1990s, Plimer went to court alleging misleading and deceptive advertising under the Trade Practices Act 1974 against Noah's Ark searcher Allen Roberts, arising from Plimer's attacks on Roberts' claims concerning the location of Noah's Ark. Before the trial, Plimer was removed by police from public meetings at which Roberts spoke. The court ruled that Roberts' claims did not constitute trade or commerce, and so were not covered by the act. It found that Roberts had indeed made false and misleading claims on two of 16 instances cited by Plimer, Plimer had failed to show the other 14, and the two were minor enough to not require remedy. Plimer lost the case, and was ordered to pay his own and Roberts' legal costs estimated at over 500,000 Australian dollars.

== Awards ==
- 1994 – Daley Prize, for communication of science, Australian Museum
- 1994 – Goldfields Prize, for best paper in Institution of Mining and Metallurgy
- 1995 – Eureka Prize, for promotion of science, Australian Museum
- 1995 – Australian Humanist of the Year, Humanist Society of New South Wales
- 1998 – Leopold-von-Buch-Plakette, German Geological Society
- 2001 – Centenary Medal, Australian Government
- 2002 – Eureka Prize, for best science book – A Short History of Planet Earth, Australian Museum
- 2004 – Clarke Medal, Royal Society of New South Wales
- 2005 – Rio Tinto Award, for Mining Excellence
- 2005 – Sir Willis Connolly Medal, Australasian Institute of Mining and Metallurgy
- 2009 – 'Plimerite' a new phosphate mineral named in honour of Plimer for his contributions to the geology of ore deposits, in particular the Broken Hill deposit.

== Bibliography ==
- Mineral collecting localities of the Broken Hill district, Ian Plimer, Peacock Publications, Hyde Park, S.A., 1977 (ISBN 0909209065)
- Telling lies for God – reason vs creationism, Ian Plimer, Random House, Sydney, 1994 (ISBN 0-09-182852-X)
- Minerals and rocks of the Broken Hill, White Cliffs and Tibooburra districts : a guide to the rocks and minerals of the Broken Hill district, Ian Plimer, Peacock Publications, Norwood, S. Aust., 1994 (ISBN 0909209731)
- A journey through stone : the Chillagoe story, the extraordinary history and geology of one of the richest mineral deposits in the world, Ian Plimer, Reed Books, Kew, Vic., 1997 (ISBN 0730104990)
- A short history of planet Earth, Ian Plimer, ABC Books, 2001 (ISBN 0-7333-1004-4)
- Heaven and Earth, Ian Plimer, Quartet Books (1 May 2009 hardcover ISBN 978-0-7043-7166-8) and Taylor Trade Publishing, Lanham, MD, (July 2009 Paperback ISBN 978-1-58979-472-6)
- Not for greens: he who sups with the Devil should have a long spoon, Ian Pilmer, Connor Court Pub., Ballarat, Vic., 2014 (ISBN 9781925138191)
