= East Asia Forum =

English-language policy publication

- Website type: Commentary, analysis and research
- Editors: Peter Drysdale and Shiro Armstrong
- Website: https://www.eastasiaforum.org/
- Launched: 17 October 2006

East Asia Forum (EAF) is an English-language international policy forum directed by Peter Drysdale and based at the Australian National University's Crawford School of Public Policy. It was launched in 2006 by then Australian Treasurer Peter Costello.

It is a platform for dialogue on Asian economic and public policy, publishing two articles a day online. EAF also releases a quarterly magazine, the East Asia Forum Quarterly (EAFQ), published by ANU Press.

EAF offers peer-reviewed daily analysis of economics, politics and public policy in the Asia Pacific. Articles focus on policy issues including trade, economic and social policy, governance, international relations and political developments. Content includes Australian, East Asian and Asia Pacific regional perspectives, with specialist contributors from around the region. An editorial is issued every Monday.

East Asia Forum is an initiative by the East Asian Bureau of Economic Research (EABER). Its articles are archived and catalogued by the National Library of Australia.

== Controversy ==
East Asia Forum’s website was blocked on 16 September 2023 in Singapore following a non-compliance of a correction order under the Protection from Online Falsehoods and Manipulation Act (POFMA). Ying-Kit Chan from the National University of Singapore contributed an article titled "A spate of scandals strikes Singapore", in which the Prime Minister's Office stated that the article had four falsehoods relating to corruption investigations into various government ministers and extramarital affairs among four Members of Parliament. The block was rescinded on 22 September 2023 after the article was retracted and removed upon the author's request. On 24 January 2025, the website was again blocked following the failure to comply with a POFMA notice. Associate Professor Michael Barr contributed an article entitled “Singapore’s new prime minister entangled in old politics”, that the Singapore government said contained false statements on Singapore’s governance.

== Contributors ==
East Asia Forum has nearly 4000 listed contributors, many of whom submit opinion pieces on a regular basis. Contributors to the online and print publications include:

- Amitav Acharya
- Alan Auerbach
- Roberto Azevêdo
- Muhamad Chatib Basri
- Jagdish Bhagwati
- Gordon de Brouwer
- Kerry Brown
- Bob Carr
- Michael E. Clarke
- Barry Desker
- Paul Dibb
- Rod Eddington
- Gareth Evans
- Jeffrey Frankel
- Chas Freeman
- Ross Garnaut
- Ken Henry
- Isabel Hilton
- Takatoshi Ito
- Bilahari Kausikan
- Homi Kharas
- Rajiv Kumar
- Naomi Koshi
- David Lampton
- Andrei Lankov
- Li Shengjiao
- Justin Yifu Lin
- Kishore Mahbubani
- Warwick McKibbin
- Rakesh Mohan
- Chung-in Moon
- Sri Mulyani
- Marty Natalegawa
- Andrew Nathan
- Joseph Nye
- Ong Keng Yong
- William Overholt
- Mari Pangestu
- Martin Parkinson
- Surin Pitsuwan
- Adam Posen
- Stephen S. Roach
- Kevin Rudd
- Brian Schmidt
- Rodolfo Severino Jr.
- Andrew Sheng
- Hu Shuli
- Hadi Soesastro
- Ramesh Thakur
- Edwin Truman
- David Vines
- Ezra Vogel
- Wang Gungwu
- Hugh White
- Yu Yongding
