= Currency War of 2009–2011 =

Worldwide episode of competitive devaluation

The Currency War of 2009–2011 was an episode of competitive devaluation which became prominent in the financial press in September 2010. It involved states competing with each other in order to achieve a relatively low valuation for their own currency, so as to assist their domestic industry. Due to the Great Recession, the export sectors of many emerging economies experienced declining orders and from 2009, several states began or increased their levels of currency intervention. According to many analysts the currency war had largely fizzled out by mid-2011 although the war rhetoric persisted into the following year. In 2013, there were concerns of an outbreak of another currency war, this time between Japan and the Euro-zone.

Both private sector analysts and politicians suggested the phrase currency war overstated the extent of hostility between the states which were engaged in competitive devaluation, but the term was widely used since Brazil's finance minister Guido Mantega September 2010 announced that a "currency war" had broken out.

== Competitive devaluation in 2009 ==
Following the Great Recession, widespread concern arose among advanced economies concerning the size of their deficits; they increasingly joined emerging economies in viewing export-led growth as their ideal strategy. In March 2009, economist Ted Truman became one of the first people to warn of the dangers of competitive devaluation.

On 27 September 2010, Brazilian Finance Minister Guido Mantega said that the world is "in the midst of an international currency war." Numerous financial journalists agreed with Mantega's view, referring to recent interventions by various countries seeking to devalue their exchange rate including China, Japan, Colombia, Israel and Switzerland.

Other analysts asserted that fears of a currency war were exaggerated. In September, International Monetary Fund (IMF) Managing Director Dominique Strauss-Kahn and US Treasury Secretary Tim Geithner were reported as saying the chances of a genuine currency war breaking out were low; however by early October, Strauss-Kahn warned that the risk of a currency war was real. He also suggested the IMF could help resolve the trade imbalances which he saw as the underlying casus belli for competitive devaluation. Strauss-Kahn said that resorting to currency manipulation "is not a solution [and] it can even lead to a very bad situation. There's no domestic solution to a global problem."

Daniel Tenengauzer, the head of emerging-market currency and rates strategy at Merrill Lynch, suggested talk of a currency war was "political posturing", noting that emerging economies had been intervening on a wider scale back in 2009. George Soros expressed concern saying "I share the growing concern about the misalignment of currencies. Brazil's finance minister speaks of a latent currency war, and he is not far off the mark. It is in the currency markets where different economic policies and different economic and political systems interact and clash."

Considerable attention was focused on China. For much of 2009 and 2010, China had been under pressure from the US to allow its currency to appreciate. Between June and October 2010, China allowed a 2% appreciation of the yuan, but there were concerns from Western observers that China only relaxed her intervention due to heavy external pressure. After the June G20 meeting, the yuan appreciated by about 1%, only to slowly devalue again until further US pressure in September when the yuan began to appreciation again in light of congressional hearings which were to be held the same month to discuss measures to force a revaluation. Financial journalist Martin Wolf has suggested that instead of using protectionist measures that may spark a trade war, western economies would be better served by using targeted capital controls against China to prevent the country from buying foreign assets in order to further devalue the yuan.

== Competitive devaluation in 2010 ==
=== Negotiations at the 2010 annual IMF meeting ===
In the middle of October 2010, finance ministers gathered in Washington, D.C. for the 2010 annual IMF and World Bank meeting, which was dominated by talk of currency war. Just prior to the IMF meeting, the Institute of International Finance had called for leading countries to agree on a currency pact to aid the rebalancing of the world economy and to avert the threat of competitive devaluation.

Canadian Finance Minister Jim Flaherty said "This is a crucial time that we need to address the commitment of our leaders to free trade, that we avoid protectionist measures." His US counterpart Timothy Geithner added that "global rebalancing is not progressing as well as needed to avoid threats to the global economic recovery." Various international finance ministers said the IMF should help reducing the possibility of a currency war by encouraging non-competitive initiatives to expand national economies. The IMF, in turn, urged most developed countries to boost exports, and for some emerging markets to enhance domestic consumption and to let their currencies appreciate. Dominique Strauss-Kahn said the IMF would highlight the linkages between economies as part of a "systemic stability initiative". Its steering committee added that it would work on capital flows, exchange rate movements and the accumulation of capital reserves. Strauss-Kahn added "There is clearly the idea beginning to circulate that currencies can be used as a policy weapon...Translated into action, such an idea would represent a very serious risk to the global recovery...Any such approach would have a negative and very damaging longer-run impact." Australia's Federal Treasurer, Wayne Swan played down rumours of a currency war and said global financial ministers were working in a coordinated way to deal with "exchange rate reform". However, the opposition's finance minister, Andrew Robb, warned that with some countries were causing a trade war by deliberately devaluing their currencies and he urged Swann to alert "all of these other major countries to the very damaging implications of a currency war".

During the IMF meeting there was disagreement based on conflicting views about how the global economy could recover from the 2009 recession. Countries led by the United States said the best path forward was through the adoption of flexible exchange rates, while others, led by China, resisted calls to appreciate their currency. The IMF meeting in Washington DC was inconclusive, as China rejected calls to allow rapid appreciation of its currency. Currency war was scheduled to be discussed at November's G20 summit in Seoul.

In an article published after the IMF meeting the Financial Times reported there was little sign of fruitful co-operation. The U.S. repeated its calls for further appreciation of the yuan with China blaming America for causing problems to emerging markets with excessive quantitative easing. According to Cornell University's Eswar Prasad: "China's aggressive pushback against criticism of its currency policy by shifting the line of attack towards loose monetary policies and rising public debt in advanced economies reflects its growing assertiveness and strong resistance to international pressure." In another article that was published after the meeting Reuters said "a gradual but sustained revaluation of the yuan versus the dollar combined with a halt to the dollar's own depreciation" was the least bad way forward to resolving the currency war.

Martin Wolf opined the US would inevitably win a currency war, but suggested it was better if a collaborative solution could be agreed to at the November G20. A contrasting view was published by Chinese economist Huang Yiping who argued that as US did not win the last "currency war" with Japan it had even less of a chance of doing so against China. Alan Beattie was less optimistic than Wolf about the chances that the G20 would produce a "collaborative solution", as he considered the views of the participating countries on currency to be too divergent. Speaking very shortly before the G20 summit was due to begin, Canadian Prime Minister Stephen Harper also expressed doubts that leaders would be able to agree on a solution.

=== Negotiations at the 2010 G20 summit ===
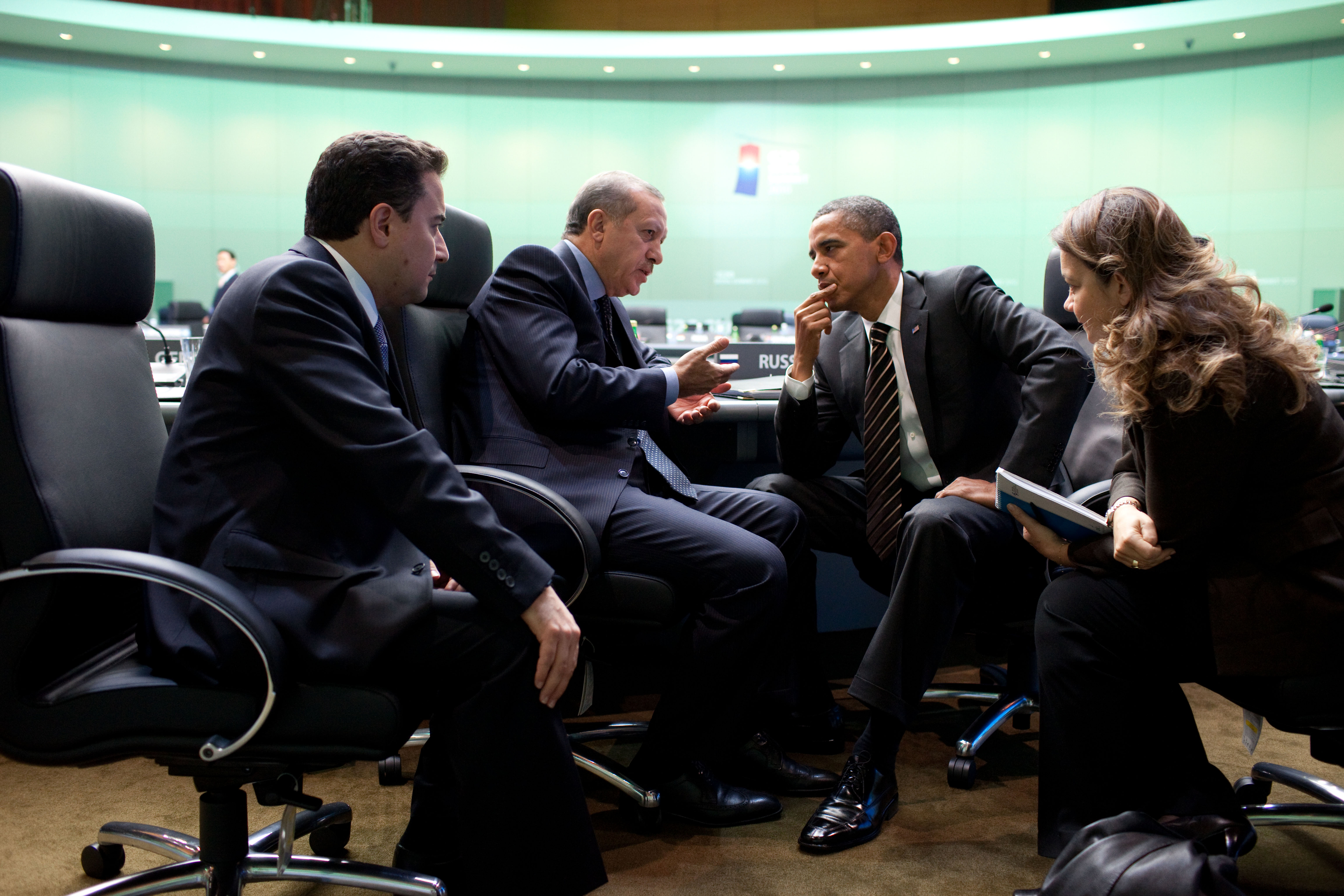
US President Obama and Turkish Prime Minister Erdoğan in talks at the Seoul G20 summit. Only limited progress was made in resolving the tensions underlying the currency war.

Discussions over the currency war dominated the summit. Leaders such as Britain's David Cameron made statements suggesting good progress had been made but most commentators said no substantial agreement had been reached. IMF managing director Dominique Strauss-Kahn said this particular summit was "more of a G20 debate than a G20 conclusion". However, the communiqué issued after the meeting included commitments to support enhanced trade imbalances monitoring and possible work on future agreement for "indicative guidelines".

A report released after the summit by the IMF warned that without additional progress global imbalances could approximately double to reach pre-crises levels by 2014. The lack of any resolution by the G20 led to the Australian reserve bank to say that the country could be exposed to harmful upwards pressure on their exchange rates if the "currency war" did not abate.

By December 2010, talk of the currency war subsided, but the primary issues still remain unresolved with many emerging economies considering increased use of capital controls to cope with potentially de-stabilising capital inflows.

== Competitive devaluation in 2011 ==
January 2011 saw new interventions to prevent currency appreciation and volatility from Brazil, South Korea and Chile. Brazil's finance minister Guido Mantega who had raised the alarm about a currency war back in September, warned that matters were beginning to devolve into a trade war. By February, the US had stepped up diplomatic efforts to persuade emerging economies such as Brazil and India that China's intervention was the root cause of the currency war. However, the US once again refrained from labelling China a currency manipulator. A Treasury report said that while China was on track for an annual appreciation of 10% ever since the country relaxed its currency peg back in June 2010, the rate of appreciation was still insufficient.

In late February Bloomberg reported that talk of currency war had subsided, with several emerging economies choosing to allow currency appreciation as a way to combat inflation. February saw the US dollar fall to its lowest level since 1973, based on a comparison against a weighted basket comprising the currencies of its major trading partners. Analysts began to converge on the view that the Federal Reserve's QE2 program would begin to wind up by the middle of the year. Analyses from both private and central banks agreed with the Fed's assessment that reducing global imbalances was in everyone's interests and pointed out that various long-term trends would make the reduction likely to happen. The IMF's February 2011 economic outlook report on the global economy was generally positive, but noted that so far little actual progress had been made in reducing imbalances.

March saw analysts from BNP Paribas report that the currency war had ended – governments of emerging economies were increasingly deciding to accept currency appreciation so as to mitigate rising food prices which was one of the causes behind civil discontent that led to the Arab Spring. In April, the Financial Times joined Bloomberg in reporting that the currency war was beginning to fizzle out, pointing to the trend of emerging economies to allow currency appreciation as a means to offset inflation. However, Mantega disagreed with suggestions that the 'currency war' was over and said it was still on-going. In an April interview with the Wall Street Journal, Mantega spoke out against the loose monetary policies of advanced nations which she said had been aggravating inflation in emerging economies.

Unlike other emerging economies, China continued holding its currency down against the dollar and instead fought inflation with interest rate rises. However, the rate rises put even greater pressure from the markets for a currency appreciation, and to prevent this, at least in the months leading up to early 2011, China bought dollar assets at a faster rate. In May, Alan Beatie suggested that the currency War was not over as the underlying tensions remained unresolved. In July 2011, Mantega once again said that the currency war was not over and that several emerging economies including Brazil were still experiencing undesirable upwards pressure on their exchange rates.

Investor confidence in the global economic outlook fell in early August, which prompted Bloomberg to suggest the currency war had entered a new phase. This followed renewed talk of a possible third round of quantitative easing by the US (QE3) and interventions over the first three days of August by Switzerland and Japan to push down the value of their currencies. In September 2011 Gideon Rachman warned that continued excessive intervention by nations trying to hold down the value of their currencies could aggravate the risk of protectionism. Guillermo Felices from Barclays Capital suggested the currency war could intensify if the US, EU and UK begin an additional round of monetary easing. As part of her opening speech for the 66th United Nations Debate, Brazilian president Dilma Rousseff called for the currency war to be ended by the increased use of floating currencies, with exchange rate policies set for the good of all rather than individual nations.

== Global perspectives ==
=== Developed economies ===
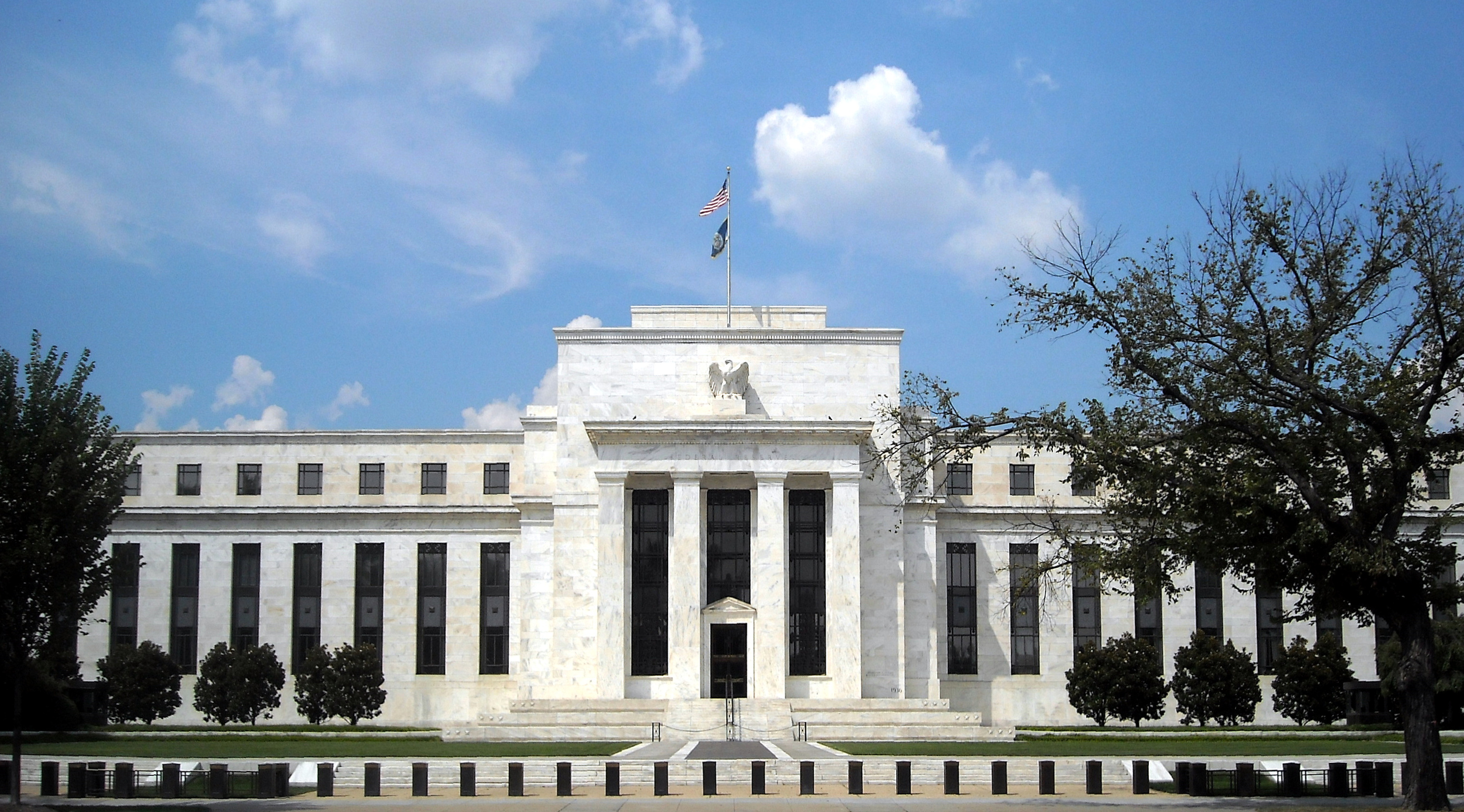
Quantitative easing programmes were deployed by the Federal Reserve from 2009 to stimulate investment and economic growth within the US. As a side effect, they contribute to capital flowing into emerging countries, pushing up the value of their currencies.

==== Anglosphere ====
The US, and to a lesser extent the UK, share a position where they have independent currencies in addition to twin deficits – both large current account deficits and large fiscal deficits. Though austerity programmes can address their fiscal deficits, the effect of these can only be to move debt from the public to private sector, unless the countries begin earning more than they spend – in other words their overall debt can only be paid off by going into current account surplus. Lowering their exchange rates, especially against the yuan, is considered by government officials and by most economists as an important part of their approach to transition towards current account surpluses. The UK and US have not directly intervened to devalue their currencies, however their QE programmes have exerted downwards exchange rate pressure. In October 2010 analysts were expecting the UK and US to employ additional QE. After Japan's intervention in the week of 5 October, there was speculation that the US Federal Reserve would also intervene to inject more money into the economy via another round of QE (QE2), hence for a short time after the dollar depreciated slightly.

The Daily Telegraph reported that while countries which have trade surpluses with the United States were trying to devalue or prevent appreciation of their currencies— including China, Japan, Korea, Thailand, and Switzerland —the US was starting to retaliate with measures such as the Reform for Fair Trade Act. It then said:

The atomic bomb, of course, is quantitative easing by the Federal Reserve. America has in effect issued an ultimatum to China and G20: either you stop this predatory behaviour and agree to some formula for global rebalancing, or we will deploy QE2 'a l’outrance' to flood your economies with excess liquidity. We will cause you to overheat and drive up your wage costs. We will impose a de facto currency revaluation by more brutal and disruptive means, and there is little you can do to stop it. Pick your poison.

The Telegraph went on to say, however, that while a second round of quantitative easing may be required at a later date, there would soon be a "dangerous moment" that could backfire against the US with a weak dollar. It cited a "rush into oil and resources" and a consequent risk that a "commodity shock" could occur before a new stimulus. Thus, "US risks gambling away the 'exorbitant privilege' it has enjoyed for two-thirds of a century as currency hegemon."

By mid October 2010, the dollar had dropped 7% since a 27 August speech by Federal Reserve Chairman Ben Bernanke in which he said there was a possibility of further easing monetary policy. On 18 October, US Treasury Secretary Tim Geithner stated "It is very important for people to understand that the United States of America and no country around the world can devalue its way to prosperity and competitiveness." Following this statement the value of the dollar rose as speculators calculated that at least in the short term it would be less likely for the US to intentionally devalue its currency.

In late October the US unveiled a suggestion to address the broader issues relating to trade imbalances by introducing indicative guidelines that for most countries would target a maximum current account surplus of 4% of GDP. While the plan attracted immediate opposition, the general notion of limiting excessive surpluses achieved cautious support at the October meeting of G20 finance ministers, including from China. By early November opposition from Germany and China had strengthened, leading the US to apparently back down from the plan, though speaking three days before the November G20 summit President Obama suggested the US would be pushing hard for an aggressive reduction of global imbalances.

Australia, Canada and New Zealand all appear to have refrained from intervening against their currencies or from imposing new capital controls and have each seen substantial appreciation of their currencies in 2010. However both Australia and Canada have strong economies and are rich in natural resources. According to Moody's, negative effects from New Zealand's appreciation is offset by the fact that her currency has depreciated with respect to Australia, her biggest customer.

==== Eurozone ====
The Eurozone is a special case where some members, principally Germany, enjoy a large current account surplus and so could accept or even benefit from currency appreciation. Other countries though such as Greece, Spain, Portugal and Ireland have twin deficits and so to a large extent would benefit from a depreciation. While the European Central Bank (ECB) did practice some QE in 2009, this was to a much lower extent than the US or UK, and they did not deploy a second round. The value of the Euro has been effectively left to float, and in fact early in 2010 central authorities intervened to defend the Euro's value against the market. Following the generally positive results from bank stress testing that were released in summer, market participants stopped speculating against the Euro, and the currency has tended to rise as a result of other countries practicing competitive devaluation. A major driver for the rise in the Euro in the latter half of 2010 was China's purchase of Euro-denominated bonds. While China's intervention was in some ways helpful for the Eurozone, it also generated concern with several European officials speaking out against the action. These officials included: ECB governor Jean-Claude Trichet and Eurogroup president Jean-Claude Juncker.

==== Japan ====
Japan also has a large current account surplus, and in 2009 and 2010 the country allowed the Yen to appreciate. However, in September 2010 Japan twice intervened to effect a devaluation. Japan has a number of challenges that limit its ability to allow ongoing currency appreciation, including an aging population, high government debt (though not net debt as it has high private savings) and vulnerability to deflation. The September devaluation did not draw widespread international condemnation. Within a couple of weeks upwards pressure on the Yen from the markets had almost entirely undone the effect of the intervention. However shortly after the March 2011 earthquake, other G7 nations joined Japan in a rare act of solidarity, selling billions of Yen to help Japan devalue its currency against pressure from speculators who were betting on a further appreciation, as insurance firms recalled funds from abroad.

=== Emerging markets ===
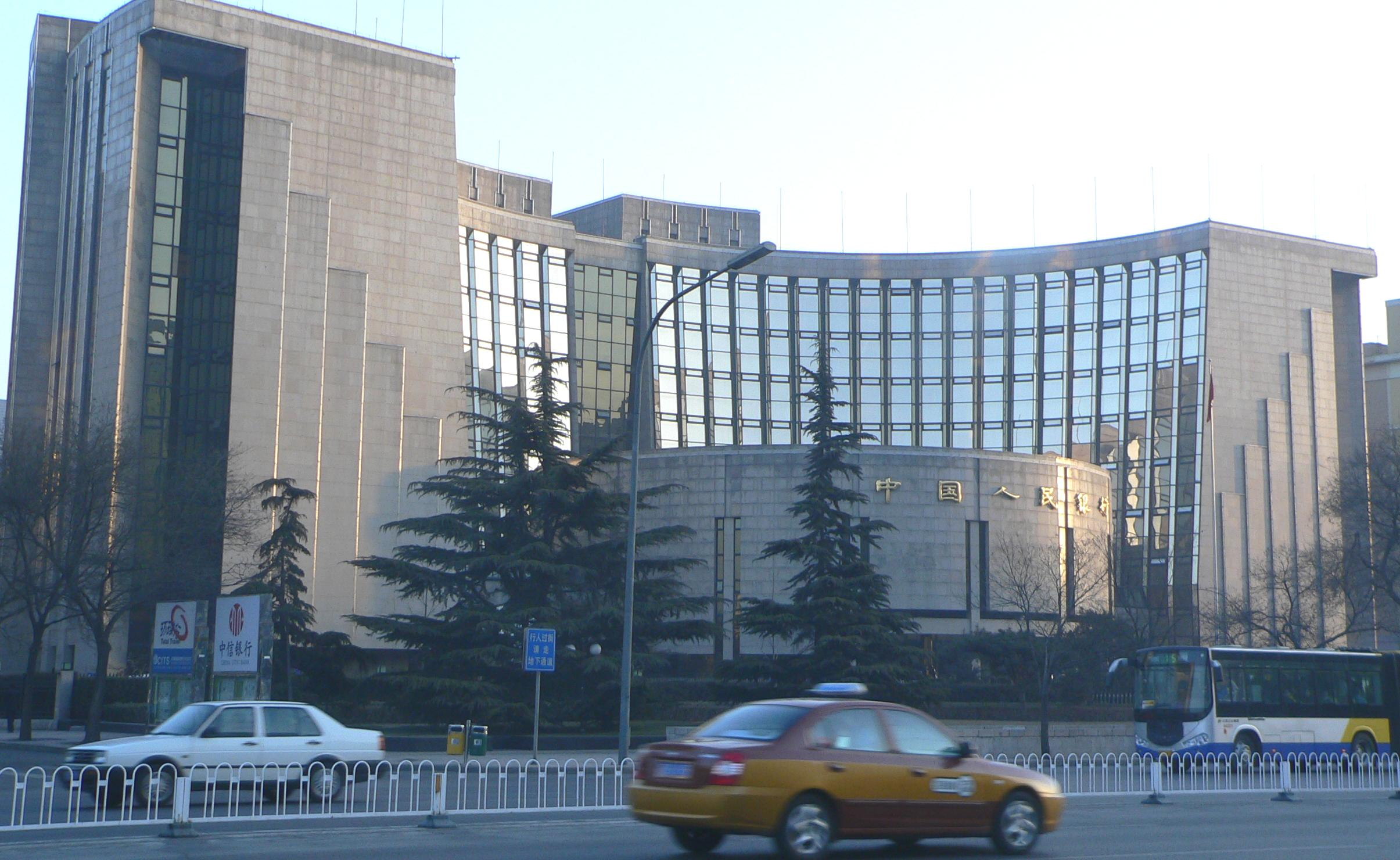
As China's exporters were hit by the global recession in 2008, the People's Bank of China began stepping up her intervention programme to prevent appreciation of the Yuan. By April 2011 Chinese state controlled banks had accumulated over one trillion in US treasuries and over 1.5 trillion in other dollar assets. China has indicated she plans to further rebalance her economy towards domestic consumption, and intends to stop buying dollar assets by 2016.

==== BRIC ====
Speaking in October 2010, Russian Finance Minister Alexei Kudrin said it was too early too make "a decision regarding currency exchange rates. Such measures aren't yet sufficiently formulated." He also stated other BRIC (Brazil, Russia, India, and China) countries support Russia in opposing any US push to limit the ability of governments to control their currencies.

India has largely taken a neutral position on the currency war, advocating a balanced solution with give and take by both China and the US, though along with Brazil she has been one of the few emerging economies to occasionally criticise China's holding down of the Yuan. Prime Minister Manmohan Singh suggested the currency war can be viewed as part of a power struggle between the US and China and that India will have to play a role to ensure a balanced outcome.

China has a large current account surplus and huge foreign reserves along with the potential to transition towards domestic demand-led growth, allowing it to appreciate the yuan and reduce the current account surplus while still maintaining high GDP growth and decreasing unemployment. However, its economy has long been geared towards export-led growth, and hence a substantial appreciation could cause a sharp rise in unemployment, as China's premier warned in early October 2010. Economic commentators such as Martin Wolf have speculated that China is wary of complying with pressure to allow a substantial currency appreciation as she considers the long period of stagnation Japan experienced after the Plaza accord as in part resulting from Japan allowing a substantial appreciation of her currency against the dollar.

Chinese premier Wen Jiabao has stated that reforms to re-balance the Chinese economy away from its current dependency on exports are well underway and that the yuan is being allowed to gradually appreciate. He warned that if China is forced to revalue its currency too fast that it would lead to social unrest in China, bankruptcy for export dependent companies and "disaster for the world". In October, China posted a record surge in its foreign exchange reserves, which was seen as a "target around the neck of China's exchange rate regime" in the effort to get the country to allow its currency to appreciate. In reaction, Geithner suggested China's attempts at limiting gains were the reason for capital controls and currency-market interventions in other emerging economies. "What's happening is, as China holds its currency down, their currencies are moving up and they're having to work very hard to make sure they're not at an unfair disadvantage with China." Bloomberg pointed out at that countries such as Brazil, South Korea and Thailand sold their respective currencies in the weeks preceding the report to curb gains and support export. South Korea, Taiwan, Brazil, Colombia and Russia were also tightening rules to limit capital flows and avoid swings in their currencies.

However, the Obama administration decided to postpone the decision to label China a "currency manipulator" until after the G20 summit in South Korea and the 2010 United States elections. China issued its own "warning" against being made a "scapegoat" for the US's failings. China accused the US of waging the currency war and that it has "exercised financial policies characterised as 'economic egoism.'" In April 2011, the Financial Times reported that Chinese officials have signaled that 2016 may be when they expect to stop intervening against their currency by buying dollar assets.

==== Latin America ====
Brazil is a large economy which has generally allowed their currency to float freely, with the exception of some low level interventions to counter large capital inflows resulting from major stock sales. As a result, since early 2009 her currency has risen substantially against the dollar, with Goldman Sachs saying the real is the most over valued currency in the world. In October 2010, Brazil began increasing her capital controls, doubling a tax on foreign purchases of fixed-income assets to 4 percent so as to curb the real's appreciation to a two-year. On 18 October, Brazil sought to curb the real's gains by raising taxed capital inflow on fixed-income assets by 2% to 6% and taxed inflows for margin deposits on futures to 6% from 0.38%.

Chile said it would implement capital controls to curb gains in the Chilean peso, which had strengthened the most in the region in the middle of 2010, citing Chile's mixed in the 1990s. Finance Minister Felipe Larrain suggested that less public spending is "one of the best ways" to prevent appreciation and that "short-term capital I don't want, so they disguise it as long-term capital and they are really playing with the interest rate differential."

Colombia and Costa Rica also initiated programmes to buy dollars to check their currency gains.

==== Other Asian economies ====
In Oct 2010, Thai Finance Minister Korn Chatikavanij said his country faces a "challenge" as the appreciation of the baht was making Thai exports less competitive, and thus he needed to try to reduce volatility in the currency but "a country like ours can[not] forcibly change the fundamental direction of our currency." Over the first nine months of 2010 the baht had risen in value by 11 percent, the second largest appreciation of Asia's 11 most heavily traded currencies. There were also concerns that exports may slow: sales to foreigners make up almost two-thirds of Thai's economic activity. Prime Minister Abhisit Vejjajiva also said Thailand may step up efforts to prevent currency appreciation from hurting its exporters.

=== Others ===
Africa was hit harder by the Great Recession than other emerging regions. African countries may not however be as adversely affected by a currency war, as one of the regions problems is the collapse of foreign investment following the crisis, so increased international investment resulting from QE2 may actually help Africa rather than excessively drive up its currencies as is feared for other emerging regions. However South African Finance Minister Pravin Gordhan has warned that currency wars could lead to "trade wars" if allowed to continue.

The threat of a currency war would adversely affect the Caricom community because the various currencies are either tied to or float against the US dollar. Export and tourism earnings are closely linked to the US or Europe, thus there is a strong dependency on the said regions unlike Latin America which has diversified its markets in the previous decade.

== Competitive devaluation in 2012 ==
Early figures for February 2012 suggested that China had experienced a monthly trade deficit of $31.5bn, her largest for almost 15 years. By March this had prompted several Chinese officials to suggest the time was approaching for them to halt the appreciation of the Renmimbi, with several independent analysts agreeing this would be reasonable. However China still has a substantial bi-lateral trade surplus with the US, and Financial Times journalists have suggested that if China returned to a fixed peg against the dollar this could re-ignite the Currency War, especially if the move coincided with the US presidential election campaign. Also in March 2012, Brazil's president Rousseff said her country was still experiencing undesirable upwards pressure on her currency, with her Finance Minister Guido Mantega saying Brazil will no longer "play the fool" and allow others to get away with competitive devaluation, announcing new measures aimed at limiting further appreciation for the Real.

In June 2012, the Financial Times reported that while international trade remained a source of contention, concerns over currency war had receded, along with signs that major currencies such as the Renminbi were now much less undervalued than they had been a year previously. Brazil currency had fallen substantially from its peak value against the dollar, allowing Mantega to begin rolling back anti-appreciation measures. In July, the IMF downgraded its assessment of the degree to which the Renminbi is undervalued from "substantially" to "moderately". However, Chinese officials were not pleased, suggesting that their exchange rate is no longer undervalued at all. Whereas in the US, presidential candidate Mitt Romney retains his pledge to brand China as a currency manipulator from his first day of office.

In October, Alan Beatie and Alice Ross for the Financial Times noted that the global trade imbalances which had driven the currency war have been sharply reduced. However, they suggest that without further reforms, the imbalances may soon widen again. They also note that Mantega once more raised the alarm about competitive devaluation, following the United States's launch of QE3 in September.

== Competitive devaluation in 2013 ==
In mid January 2013, Japan's central bank signaled the intention to launch an open ended bond buying programme which would likely devalue the yen. This resulted in numerous senior central bankers and finance ministers warning of a possible fresh round of currency war. First to raise the alarm was Alexei Ulyukayev, the first deputy chairman at Russia's central bank. He was later joined by many others including Bahk Jae-wan, the finance minister for South Korea, and by Jens Weidmann, president of the Bundesbank. Weidmann held the view that interventions during the 2009-11 period were not intense enough to count as competitive devaluation, but that a genuine currency war is now a real possibility. Japan's economy minister Akira Amari has said that the Bank of Japan's bond buying programme is intended to combat deflation, and not to weaken the yen. Most commentators have asserted that if a new round of competitive devaluation occurs it would be harmful for the global economy. However some analysts have stated that Japan's planned actions could be in the long term interests of the rest of the world; just as he did for the 2010-11 incident, economist Barry Eichengreen has suggested that even if many other countries start intervening against their currencies it could boost growth worldwide, as the effects would be similar to semi-coordinated global monetary expansion. Other analysts have expressed skepticism about the risk of a war breaking out, with Marc Chandler, chief currency strategist at Brown Brothers Harriman, advising that: "A real currency war remains a remote possibility."

== See also ==
- Comparison with the Great Depression currency war
- Trade war
