= Tim Murphy (Pennsylvania politician) =

American politician (1952–2026)

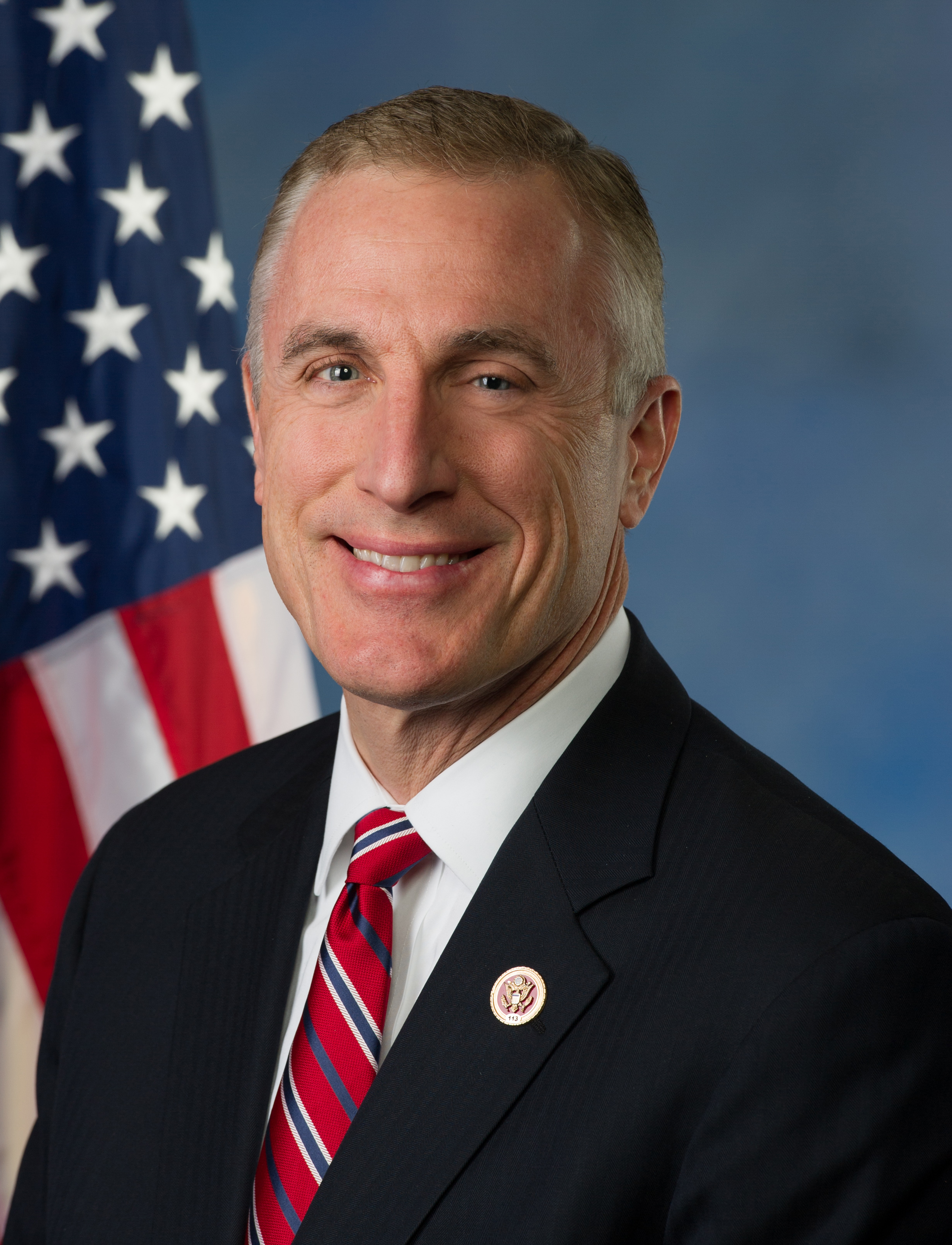
- Official portrait, 2013

Member of the U.S. House of Representatives from Pennsylvania's 18th district
- In office January 3, 2003 – October 21, 2017
- Preceded by: Constituency established
- Succeeded by: Conor Lamb

Member of the Pennsylvania Senate from the 37th district
- In office January 7, 1996 – January 3, 2003
- Preceded by: Michael Fisher
- Succeeded by: John Pippy

Personal details
- Born: Timothy Francis Murphy; September 11, 1952 Cleveland, Ohio, U.S.
- Died: July 18, 2026 (aged 73) Upper St. Clair Township, Pennsylvania, U.S.
- Party: Republican
- Spouse: Nanette Missig
- Children: 1
- Education: Wheeling Jesuit University (BS); Cleveland State University (MA); University of Pittsburgh (PhD)

Military service
- Branch/service: United States Navy
- Rank: Lieutenant Commander
- Unit: United States Navy Reserve
- Murphy's voice Murphy supporting the Helping Families in Mental Health Crisis Act of 2016. Recorded July 18, 2016

Timothy Francis Murphy (September 11, 1952 – July 18, 2026) was an American politician and psychologist who served as the U.S. representative for Pennsylvania's 18th congressional district from 2003 until his resignation in 2017. The district included several suburbs south of Pittsburgh. A member of the Republican Party, he also represented the 37th Senate district in the Pennsylvania State Senate from 1996 to 2003. Murphy consistently carried the 18th district with at least 58% of the vote, including unopposed re-election bids in 2014 and 2016.

== Early life, education, and psychologist career ==
One of eleven children, Murphy was born in Cleveland and was raised in Northfield, Ohio, where he attended St. Barnabas Catholic School and Walsh Jesuit High School. He received his Bachelor of Science from Wheeling Jesuit University, his MA from Cleveland State University, and his PhD in psychology from the University of Pittsburgh. Upon leaving school, he became a practicing psychologist and an assistant professor at the University of Pittsburgh. He also made regular appearances on KDKA-TV in Pittsburgh from 1979 to 1995 as a health-care expert.

Murphy co-wrote The Angry Child (2002), which won the National Parenting Publications Award and was featured on Book TV. A few years later, he co-wrote Overcoming Passive-Aggression (2005), again with Loriann Hoff Oberlin, a writer/author and mental-health counselor. Overcoming Passive-Aggression received abundant reviews, including some from specialist mental health publications. Murphy has been interviewed by reporters from Psychology Today, The Washington Post, USA Today, CBS Early Show, CNN, Face the Nation, C-SPAN, and others in the media on the topics of mental health, anger management and violence, parenting, and relationships.

== Pennsylvania Senate (1996–2003) ==
In 1996, Republican incumbent State Sen. Michael Fisher decided not to run for re-election in order to run for Pennsylvania Attorney General. Murphy decided to run in Pennsylvania's 37th Senate district and won the Republican primary, defeating John Schnatterly 70%–30%. In the general election, he defeated State Representative Greg Fajt 55%–45%. In 2000, he won re-election to a second term, defeating Joseph Rudolph 64%–36%.

As a state senator, Murphy wrote the Pennsylvania Patient Bill of Rights and supported public funding for medical research. In 2002, the political website PoliticsPA named him to the list of "Smartest Legislators". He resigned his state senate seat on January 3, 2003.

== U.S. House of Representatives (2003–2017) ==
=== Elections ===
2002

After redistricting, Murphy ran for the newly redrawn 18th Congressional District in 2002. The district had previously been the 20th, represented by four-term Democrat Frank Mascara. However, the legislature re-drew the district after the 2000 Census in such a way that a large portion of Mascara's district ended up in the neighboring Johnstown-based 12th District, represented by an incumbent of 28-years John Murtha. The new district lines were harshly criticized, in part because in some areas portions of several neighborhoods—and even streets—were split between districts. In parts of the eastern part of the district, one side of the street was in the 18th while the other was in the 12th. In parts of the western portion, one side of the street was in the 18th while the other was in the 14th. In the most extreme example, nearly all of Mascara's hometown of Charleroi was drawn into the 12th district, except that a long tendril extending from Allegheny County to Mascara's house stayed in the 18th.

After a legal battle, the courts largely upheld Pennsylvania's redistricting plan after some minor modifications. Murphy was a member of the committee that redrew Pennsylvania's congressional map, and rumors abounded that he'd reconfigured the district for himself, even though numerous Democrats were also on the committee. Mascara challenged Murtha in the Democratic primary for the 12th District, since the newly configured 12th was geographically more his district than Murtha's. However, Murtha easily defeated Mascara. This removed a significant barrier to Murphy. Even though Democrats outnumbered Republicans by 70,000 registered voters, it was somewhat friendlier to Republicans than the old 20th had been.

Murphy won the Republican primary unopposed and won the general election, defeating Democrat Jack Machek 60%–40%.

2004

Murphy won re-election to a second term, defeating Mark Boles 63%–37%.

2006

In 2006, Murphy was confronted by KDKA News reporter Andy Sheehan with evidence indicating his District Office employees were illegally working on his campaign. Murphy was challenged by Democrat Chad Kluko, a telecommunications executive, in the November 2006 general election. Murphy won re-election to a third term, defeating Kluko 58%–42%.

2008

Murphy was challenged by Democrat Steve O'Donnell, a Monroeville health care executive. Murphy won re-election to a fourth term, defeating O'Donnell 64%–36%.

2010

Murphy was challenged by Democrat Dan Connolly. Murphy was endorsed by Veterans of Foreign Wars PAC and the US Chamber of Commerce. Murphy won re-election to a fifth term, defeating Connolly 67%–33%.

2012

For the first time in Murphy's career, he was challenged in the Republican primary. Evan Feinberg, also of Upper St. Clair, was a 28-year-old political novice and "Tea Party" favorite, was endorsed by Senators Rand Paul and Tom Coburn, FreedomWorks, and ABC Contractors. Murphy had the backing of two anti-abortion groups: National Right to Life Committee and PA Pro-Life Federation. He was also endorsed by former Governor Tom Ridge, former Congresswoman Melissa Hart, Allegheny County Republican Party Chairman Jim Roddey, State Representative Mark Mustio, State Senate candidate D. Raja, the NRA Political Victory Fund, and the Fraternal Order of Police of Allegheny County. Murphy won the primary 63%–33%. In the general election, he won re-election to his sixth term, defeating Washington County Commissioner Larry Maggi 64%–36%.

2014

Murphy successfully ran for re-election to a seventh term in the U.S. House in the 2014 election. He was re-nominated unopposed in the Republican primary and was unopposed in the general election, since no candidates filed to run in the Democratic primary.

2016

Murphy was unopposed in the primary and the general election. He was re-elected to his eighth term in the U.S. House. This would be his last election to the House after later resigning on October 21, 2017.

=== Tenure ===
Murphy in 2017

On November 26, 2005, Murphy was injured during a traffic accident in Iraq while riding in a van along with fellow Congressmen Jim Marshall and Ike Skelton. The van swerved off the road to avoid an oncoming vehicle and overturned, injuring Murphy and Skelton. The two were airlifted to Ibn Sina Hospital in Baghdad. After an MRI indicated head and neck injuries, Murphy was flown to the U.S. Military's Landstuhl Regional Medical Center in Germany for further tests, which indicated no permanent damage. After wearing a neck brace for a brief period, Murphy made a full recovery.

He opposed both Wall Street bailouts in 2008, the $820 billion stimulus package supported by President Obama, and the climate change/greenhouse gas initiative bill known as "Cap and Trade".

Murphy was named a "Hero of the Taxpayer" by Americans for Tax Reform. Notably, he voted to increase the debt limit along with historic budget cuts in August 2011. Prior to that, he approved the "short term" debt limit increase.

Murphy supported a House earmark ban in theory but made nearly $14 million in earmark requests in 2010. The left-leaning lobbying group called Citizens for Responsibility and Ethics in Washington (CREW) released its third annual report on the most corrupt members of Congress titled "Beyond DeLay: The 22 Most Corrupt Members of Congress (and two to watch)". Murphy was included on the list. CREW issued its analysis of Murphy's alleged ethical lapses.

Murphy co-sponsored the Currency Reform for Fair Trade Act, along with Democratic Representative Tim Ryan of Ohio. The bill, which passed the House of Representatives on September 29, 2010, received bi-partisan support. The final vote was 348–79. The measure would authorize the United States Department of Commerce to impose tariffs and countervailing duties against goods from countries with currencies that it deems are undervalued.

Murphy told WDUQ that the goal was to "protect domestic manufacturers and the steel industry from countries unwilling to compete fairly in the global marketplace". He added that by tying China's currency to the dollar and not floating its currency on the open market, China could undercut US manufacturers by 40%. In other words, manufacturers in China could make and ship products to the US for less than a US manufacturer could buy the raw materials. The Senate failed to take up the legislation, and Murphy reintroduced the bi-partisan measure in February 2011.

Following the shooting of Arizona Congresswoman Gabby Giffords (D-AZ), Murphy and Mental Health Caucus co-chair Grace Napolitano (D-CA) spoke with national media about mental health issues. Both members also held briefings for congressional staffers with questions on the shooting.

=== Mental health advocacy and legislation ===
Following the December 14, 2012 mass shooting of school children at Sandy Hook Elementary School in Newtown, Connecticut, Murphy organized a series of hearings across the nation on the issue of mental health. Adam Lanza, the perpetrator of the shooting, had been diagnosed with a range of mental health problems which deteriorated severely and, "combined with an atypical preoccupation with violence... (and) access to deadly weapons... proved a recipe for mass murder," according to the Connecticut Office of the Child Advocate.

Murphy's hearings included testimony by families who experienced firsthand the shortage of available beds and the legal limits placed on efforts to get help for members. Virginia State Sen. Creigh Deeds recounted the death of his son who, after being recommended for psychiatric commitment, was sent home because of a lack of available beds. Gus Deeds went on to stab his father before committing suicide.

Murphy drafted a bill called the Helping Families in Mental Health Crisis Act, which passed the House of Representatives by a vote of 422–2 in July 2016. The bill attracted support in the press and with various advocacy organizations, with one writer in The Wall Street Journal pointing out that Murphy's bill was the only one likely to have prevented shootings such as those that felled Rep. Gabrielle Giffords, as well as other victims of a spate of shootings.

The bill was later folded into the larger 21st Century Cures Act and included the following provisions:

- Created the Office of Assistant Secretary of Mental Health and Substance Abuse.
- Mandated better coordination of federal programs, creating an advisory board to oversee the effort.
- Mandated more scientifically based models to create standards for reviewing grants and mental health program funding.

=== Committee assignments ===
- Committee on Energy and Commerce
  - Subcommittee on Environment and Economy
  - Subcommittee on Health
  - Subcommittee on Oversight and Investigations (chair)

Murphy previously served on the Veterans Affairs and Government Reform committees.

=== Caucus memberships ===
- Congressional Steel Caucus (chair)
- 21st Century Healthcare Caucus
- Congressional Arts Caucus
- Doctor's Caucus (co-chair)
- Mental Health Caucus
- Men's Health Caucus
- Republican Main Street Partnership
- United States Congressional International Conservation Caucus

=== Extramarital affair and resignation ===
In early September 2017, Murphy admitted to an extramarital affair with Shannon Edwards, a 32-year-old forensic psychologist. The affair came to light in the course of Edwards' divorce proceedings. On October 3, 2017, Murphy's hometown newspaper, the Pittsburgh Post-Gazette, reported that a text message on January 5 of that year from Edwards to Murphy included the statement, "[Y]ou have zero issue posting your pro-life stance all over the place when you had no issue asking me to abort our unborn child just last week when we thought that was one of the options" in the midst of an unfounded pregnancy scare. To which Murphy replied, "I get what you say about my March for life messages. I've never written them. Staff does them. I read them and winced. I told staff don't write any more. I will."

In the same article, the Post-Gazette published a June 8 memorandum from Murphy's chief of staff to Murphy complaining of the congressman's repeated harassment of staff and his "hostile, erratic, unstable, angry, aggressive and abusive behavior", which led to an "inability to hire and retain competent staff, [and] abysmal office morale".

On October 4, Murphy announced that he would not run for an eighth term in 2018. During the next 24 hours, several former staffers came forward with claims of an abusive environment in his office. By October 5, House Republican leaders concluded the allegations should be investigated by the House Ethics Committee. Fearing that a wave of unflattering stories would be published, creating a distraction, they pressed Murphy to leave immediately. Accordingly, he resigned from the House on October 21.

In February 2018, Edwards announced that she intended to run for Congress and that she expected the affair with Murphy to be a campaign issue. However, she did not file the paperwork to run in the 2018 elections.

== Electoral history ==
Pennsylvania's 18th congressional district: Results 2002–2016
Year	Democrat	Votes	Pct	Republican	Votes	Pct
2002^{★}	Jack Machek	79,451	40%	Tim Murphy	119,885	60%
2004	Mark G. Boles	117,420	37%	Tim Murphy	197,894	63%
2006^{★}	Chad Kluko	105,419	42%	Tim Murphy	144,632	58%
2008	Steve O'Donnell	116,446	36%	Tim Murphy	206,916	64%
2010	Dan Connolly	77,212	33%	Tim Murphy	158,224	67%
2012	Larry Maggi	115,975	36%	Tim Murphy	204,784	64%
2014				Tim Murphy	166,076	100%
2016				Tim Murphy	293,684	100%

^{★}Write-in and minor candidate notes: In 2002, write-ins received 13 votes. In 2006, write-ins received 189 votes.

== Personal life and death ==
Murphy was married to Nanette Missig. They had one daughter, Bevin, and multiple grandchildren.

Murphy died on July 18, 2026 from an apparent heart attack at his home in Upper St. Clair Township, Pennsylvania, at the age of 73.

U.S. House of Representatives
Preceded by Mike Doyle	Member of the U.S. House of Representatives from Pennsylvania's 18th congressional district 2003–2017	Succeeded by Conor Lamb
