= Raghbendra Jha =

Indian economist and an academic

Prof. Raghbendra Jha
- Born: August 9, 1953
- Died: November 20, 2023 (aged 70)
- Occupations: Economist and academic

Academic background
- Education: BA (hons)., Economics; MA., Economics; M.Phil., Economics; Ph.D., Economics
- Alma mater: Delhi University; Columbia University

Academic work
- Institutions: Australian National University

Raghbendra Jha (9 August 1953 – 20 November 2023) was an Indian economist and professor emeritus in the Arndt-Corden Department of Economics at the Crawford School of Public Policy at Australian National University. Jha's research focused on public economics, macroeconomics, development economics, and the economy of India. He has authored and edited numerous books, including Macroeconomics for Developing Countries, Modern Public Economics, Facets of India’s Economy and Her Society, Environmental Sustainability: A Consumption Approach, and Macroeconomics for Development: Prognosis and Prospects and several others.

Jha was a fellow of the World Innovation Foundation and the Research School of Asia and the Pacific at Australian National University. He was the editor for the International Journal of Economics and Business. He also served as the book series editor for Lecture Notes in Economics and Policy published by World Scientific, member of the panel of series editors for Institutions and Development in South Asia, and in 2023 served as a guest editor of Journal of Risk and financial management for the special issue on bank lending and monetary policy.

== Education ==
Jha obtained his B.A. (honours) in economics from St. Stephen's College at Delhi University in 1973, and his M.A. in economics from the Delhi School of Economics at the same university in 1975. He then enrolled at Columbia University in New York, where he completed his M.Phil. in Economics and earned his Ph.D. in economics in 1978 under the supervision of Edmund S. Phelps.

== Career ==
Beginning his career at Columbia University in 1978, Jha served as an instructor of economics before becoming an assistant professor in the department of economics. Following that, from 1979 to 1983, he held an appointment as an assistant professor at Williams College. From 1983 to 1992, he was reader in the department of economics, Delhi School of Economics. He served as a visiting associate professor at Queen's University at Kingston, and visiting faculty at University of Warwick, UK, he was also professor at the National Institute of Public Finance and Policy in New Delhi, and professor at Indian Institute of Management, Bangalore. From 1995 to 2000, he held an appointment as a professor of economics at the Indira Gandhi Institute of Development Research and served as the professor and executive director of the Australia South Asia Research Centre, Arndt-Corden Department of Economics at the Australian National University in Canberra from 2001 to 2021. He became professor emeritus after retiring from his ANU professorship in 2021.

Jha was program director, inaugural director for economic growth and development, at the Centre for Applied Macroeconomic Analysis in 2004, and head of the Arndt-Corden Department of Economics from February 2014 to March 2017.

== Research ==
Jha authored numerous publications spanning the areas public economics, macroeconomics, and the economy of India, including book chapters, monographs and articles in peer-reviewed journals. His research has particularly focused on areas such as public policy in developing countries, poverty alleviation, agricultural growth, inequality, optimal taxation, the economic and social history of India, market price behavior, food security, and fiscal federalism in India.

=== Public economics ===
Jha has made contributions to the field of public economics through his research on taxation in informal economies, challenges of VAT, public expenditure theory, global public goods, and incentive effects of taxation in developing countries. In 1999, he explored the tax efficiency of fifteen major Indian states from 1980–81 to 1992–93, revealing a moral hazard problem with central grants. Wealthier states do not necessarily show higher tax efficiency, and he suggested increasing the weight on tax effort in central grant formulas to enhance tax efficiency. His research findings indicated no convergence in tax efficiency rankings over time, recommending adjustments in central grant formulas to incentivize states. He also examined optimal pricing for public sector commodities, considering distributional preferences and flexible production, revealing increasing returns to scale in production, challenging assumptions in studies on the Indian economy. Furthermore, his research emphasized the increased social cost of providing public goods due to the deadweight cost of taxation.

=== Agricultural growth ===
In his research on agricultural growth, Jha examined the grain market and proposed a method to analyze the Bid-Ask Spread of wholesalers, shedding light on production and consumption patterns. His findings contributed to understanding Bid-Ask Spread components in agricultural markets. Furthermore, he explored the efficiency of wheat farming in India using Data Envelopment Analysis (DEA), revealing higher efficiency in large farms and highlighting policy implications for land reforms. He emphasized testing market integration in agricultural markets, finding incomplete integration due to government interference and providing policy insights for market inefficiencies and food security. He also proposed and tested a model of asymmetric price transmission.

=== Macroeconomics ===
Some of Jha's research also focused on macroeconomics and the effects of fiscal policy in developed and developing countries. In two editions of his book, Macroeconomics for Developing Countries, he examined the argument regarding adopting Western policies or developing unique frameworks tailored to the needs of developing nations. He provided a study of the standard macroeconomic theory necessary to understand this argument. In his book Macroeconomics for Development: Prognosis and Prospects he assessed the impact of the COVID pandemic crisis on prospects for development of less developed countries and examined the challenges of designing macroeconomic policies under extreme conditions such as zero interest rates. His research also explored various aspects, including the roles of fiscal authorities, the impact of trade shocks, and the costs and risks associated with asset development and infrastructure. It provided empirical evidence on deficit sustainability, examined the endogeneity of money supply in relation to fiscal policy and capital flows, and highlighted challenges in implementing stabilization policies. Moreover, his research on India revealed a decrease in corruption with economic growth, emphasizing the positive impact of the Right to Information Act (RTI) 2005. Additionally, he analyzed the political economy of India's economic growth, emphasizing challenges in increasing employment elasticity and stressing the need for forward-looking economic reforms, policy measures, and attitudinal changes in government bureaucracy to expedite economic growth.

=== Poverty alleviation ===
Jha's studies have examined the causes, patterns, and impacts of poverty, aiming to propose strategies for poverty alleviation. His analysis has shed light on the evolution, structure, and determinants of rural poverty in India, offering policy recommendations for improving anti-poverty strategies. He has also investigated the relationship between landholdings and participation in the National Rural Employment Guarantee Program (NREGP), revealing potential issues of program capture and highlighting the complementarity between NREGP and the Public Distribution System (PDS). His work underscored the need for supplementary measures to enhance real income transfer through food subsidies.

Jha's research uncovered high program capture in rural India's workfare programs, particularly among the general population and Scheduled Castes. He highlighted potential collusion between the elite and program implementers, favoring income-based targeting over social group-based targeting. Additionally, he examined the impact of public works programs and food subsidies on poverty and undernutrition in rural India, emphasizing the significance of implementation, targeting, and coverage.

== Bibliography ==
=== Selected articles ===
- Jha, Raghbendra (2000). Reducing Poverty and Inequality in India Has Liberalization Helped? (Report). doi:10.22004/ag.econ.295536.
- Jha, Raghbendra; Mohanty, M. S.; Chatterjee, Somnath; Chitkara, Puneet (2000). "Tax efficiency in selected Indian states". Advances in Public Economics. pp. 91–104. doi:10.1007/978-3-642-57654-6_5. ISBN 978-3-642-63324-9.
- Jha, Raghbendra; Murthy, K.V.Bhanu (June 2003). "An inverse global environmental Kuznets curve". Journal of Comparative Economics. 31 (2): 352–368. doi:10.1016/S0147-5967(03)00042-8. hdl:1885/40890.
- Jha, Raghbendra; Sharma, Anurag (March 2004). "Structural Breaks, Unit Roots, and Cointegration: A Further Test of the Sustainability of the Indian Fiscal Deficit". Public Finance Review. 32 (2): 196–219. doi:10.1177/1091142103260858.
- Jha, Raghbendra; Bhattacharyya, Sambit; Gaiha, Raghav; Shankar, Shylashri (September 2009). "'Capture' of anti-poverty programs: An analysis of the National Rural Employment Guarantee Program in India". Journal of Asian Economics. 20 (4): 456–464. doi:10.1016/j.asieco.2009.03.003.
- Jha, Raghbendra; Gaiha, Raghav; Pandey, Manoj K.; Kaicker, Nidhi (November 2013). "Food subsidy, income transfer and the poor: A comparative analysis of the public distribution system in India's states". Journal of Policy Modeling. 35 (6): 887–908. doi:10.1016/j.jpolmod.2013.01.002.

=== Selected books ===
- Macroeconomics for Developing Countries (2003) ISBN 9780415262149
- Environmental Sustainability A Consumption Approach (2006) ISBN 9781134227327
- Modern public economics (2010) ISBN 9781134764020
- Facets of India’s Economy and Her Society Volume I (2018) ISBN 9781137565532
- Facets of India's Economy and Her Society Volume II (2018) ISBN 9781349953424
- Macroeconomics for Development: Prognosis and Prospects (2023) ISBN 9781788977869
