= Peter Drysdale =

Australian economist (born 1938)

Professor Peter Drysdale AO
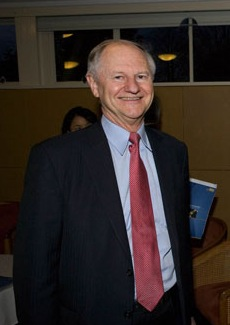
- Born: 24 October 1938 (age 87); Grafton, New South Wales

Academic background
- Education: University of New England (BA Hons); Australian National University (PhD)

Academic work
- Discipline: International trade & economic policy; Japanese economy & economic policy; Chinese trade & economic reform; East Asian economy
- Notable students: Ross Garnaut
- Awards: Officer of the Order of Australia (2016); Centenary Medal (2003); Order of the Rising Sun, Gold Rays with Neck Ribbon (2001); Dunlop Asia medal (1995); Member of the Order of Australia (1985)
- Website: www.eastasiaforum.org

Peter David Drysdale AO (born 24 October 1938, in Grafton, New South Wales) is an Australian economist and writer. He is Emeritus Professor of Economics in the Crawford School of Public Policy in the College of Law, Governance and Policy at the Australian National University. He was executive director of the Australia-Japan Research Centre (AJRC) until 2002.

Drysdale is Head of the East Asian Bureau of Economic Research (EABER). He is also co-editor of East Asia Forum, which is consistently cited in Reuters, The Telegraph, The Australian Financial Review, PBS, BBC News and Global Times, among others.

His areas of interest are international trade and economic policy and diplomacy; the East Asian economy; Australia's economic relations with Asia and the Pacific; and direct investment. His expertise encompasses work on the Japanese economy and economic policy as well as Chinese trade and transformation. His academic focus includes developments in Asia Pacific economic integration, and relations between East Asia, Europe, India, and APEC.

He is the author of many books and papers and his work has had considerable policy influence in Australia, East Asia and the Pacific. His path-breaking study The Economics of International Pluralism: Economic Policy in East Asia and the Pacific laid the intellectual foundations for the establishment of APEC.

== Biography ==
=== Education and career highlights ===
Drysdale was born in Grafton, New South Wales and graduated from Armidale High School in 1955. He attended the University of New England where he completed a BA (Hons) majoring in economics and taught for two years. He was brought by Sir John Crawford to the Australian National University where he received his PhD in 1967 under the supervision of Max Corden. In 1978, he went to Yale as Fulbright Scholar-in-Residence.

Other career highlights include: Chairman, Australian Pacific Economic Cooperation Committee (AUSPECC) (1984–87); Adjunct Professor, Columbia University (1990–92); Distinguished Associate, Asia Pacific Research Center, Stanford University (1974–present); Member, International Advisory Board, China Center for Economic Research, Peking University (1995–present); Visiting professor at Kobe, Osaka, Kyoto, and Tokyo universities in Japan; Honorary Professor of Renmin University (1998), Honorary Doctor of Letters from The Australian National University (2010).

He has been PhD supervisor to more than 70 students at the ANU, including Ross Garnaut, Huang Yiping and Paul Sheard. A volume of essays by some of his former student commemorating his retirement, Japan’s Future in East Asia and the Pacific (edited by Mari Pangestu and Ligang Song), was published in 2007.

=== Honours ===
Drysdale was appointed a member in 1985 and promoted to officer in 2016 of the Order of Australia.

In 1995, Drysdale received the Weary Dunlop medal for contributions to Australia's relations with Asia.

In 1998, he was elected a fellow of the Academy of the Social Sciences in Australia (ASSA).

Drysdale's role as a pioneer of Japanese economic studies in the West and his work as the Foundation Director of the AJRC was recognized by the Japanese government in 2001 when he received the Order of the Rising Sun, Gold Rays with Neck Ribbon, which represents the third highest of eight classes associated with this award. Drysdale is only the second Australian to be honoured in this way, the other being Sir John Charles Hoad (1856–1911).

Drysdale was again honoured by Australia in 2003 when he was awarded the Centenary Medal for his work on the East Asian and Pacific economies.

In 2010, The Australian National University conferred an Honorary Doctor of Letters on Drysdale.

=== Selected work ===
Drysdale's published work on the Asia Pacific economy, international economic relations, foreign investment, Japanese economy and economic policy include:

- East Asian Trade and Financial Integration: New Issues (Ed. with Kenichi Ishgaki, 2002)
- Japan and China: Rivalry or Co-operation in East Asia? (with Dong Dong Zhang, 2000)
- China's Entry to the WTO: Strategic Issues and Quantitative Assessments (Ed. with Ligang Song, 2000)
- Reform and Recovery in East Asia (Ed., 2000)
- Asia Pacific Regionalism: Readings in International Economic Relations (Ed. with Ross Garnaut, 1994)
- The Economics of International Pluralism: Economic Policy in East Asia and the Pacific (1988)
