= Climate Policy (journal) =

- Discipline: Climate policy, climate change
- Language: English
- Edited by: Navroz Dubash, Yacob Mulugetta and Pieter Pauw

Publication details
- History: 2001-present
- Publisher: Routledge Taylor and Francis
- Frequency: 10/year
- Impact factor: 7.1 (2022)

Standard abbreviations
- ISO 4: Clim. Policy

Indexing
- ISSN: 1469-3062 (print); 1752-7457 (web)

Links
- Journal homepage

Climate Policy is an interdisciplinary peer-reviewed scientific journal publishing research and analysis on all aspects of climate change policy, including both mitigation and adaptation. It was launched in 2000 and is published ten times per year by Taylor & Francis. The current Editor is Pieter Pauw, and the Editors-in-Chief are Navroz Dubash and Yacob Mulugetta. According to the Journal Citation Reports, the journal has a 2022 two-year impact factor of 7.1. It is ranked 3rd out of 49 in the Public Administration ranking and 18th out of 127 in Environmental Studies. The journal works closely with its Associate Editors and Editorial Board, whose international membership reflects a wide range of expertise in climate policy research, as well as policy making and implementation.

== Background ==
Climate Policy was founded in 2000 by Michael Grubb (now Professor of Climate Change and Energy Policy, University College London), who saw a gap in academic publishing on the emerging issue of climate change. Journals existed on the science of climate change, but none focused on the national and international policy dimensions. The scientific evidence for climate change was becoming clearer, including through the reports of the Intergovernmental Panel on Climate Change (IPCC), and governments had declared their commitment to address the problem by adopting the UN Framework Convention on Climate Change (UNFCCC) in 1992 and the Kyoto Protocol in 1997. New research was urgently needed on policy tools and approaches that could start to move the world onto a lower-carbon and more climate-resilient path. The vision of Climate Policy was to encourage such policy-relevant research, and make it accessible to anyone involved in tackling climate change. The first issue of Climate Policy, initially published by Elsevier, was released in November 2000, immediately before the sixth Conference of the Parties (COP 6) to the UNFCCC. The first full volume was published in 2001, with four issues. Michael Grubb served as Editor-in-Chief up to 2016, and Frank Jotzo and Harald Winkler served as joint Editors-in-Chief from 2017-2023. The first Editor was Richard Lorch (to 2013), followed by Peter Mallaburn (2014-2016), Joanna Depledge (2017-2020) and Jan Corfee-Morlot (2021-2023).

== Aims and scope ==
Climate Policy's central aim is to help inform the response to climate change by publishing rigorous, evidence-based research and analysis that is accessible and relevant, not only to academics, but also to policymakers and practitioners from all sectors. It provides a platform for new ideas, innovative approaches and research-based insights that can help advance climate policy in practice. As an interdisciplinary, policy-focused journal, Climate Policy actively encourages submissions from all relevant academic fields.

As part of its international and interdisciplinary scope, Climate Policy publishes papers on the full range of sectors implicated in climate change, and on the many policy options and governance approaches that are being implemented or proposed around the world. Of particular interest are evaluations of existing policy instruments and approaches, as well as analyses of innovative proposals and emerging issues that are new to the literature or the empirical arena.

== Contents ==
Climate Policy publishes the following article types:

- Research articles (around 7,000 words) present the latest research on all aspects of climate change policy.
- Synthesis articles (around 8,000 words) review the state of knowledge in key areas of interest.
- Policy analyses (around 5,000 words) put forward evidence-based objective analysis of particular policy approaches.
- Perspective articles (around 3,000 words) offer rigorous insights and commentary, often from senior policymakers.

In addition to its 10 issues a year, Climate Policy publishes occasional Special Issues focused on major emerging issues, and often guest edited by experts in the field. Climate Policy also highlights its thematic contributions in its Taylor & Francis “Collections”. All Climate Policy publications are also organised by policy theme in the dedicated journal website.
