= Development Policy Centre =

Think tank in Australia

Devpolicy The Development Policy Centre
- Formation: September 2010
- Type: Think tank
- Headquarters: Crawford School of Public Policy
- Location: Canberra, Australia
- Director: Stephen Howes
- Deputy Director: Ryan Edwards
- Website: devpolicy.crawford.anu.edu.au

The Development Policy Centre (Devpol) is an aid and development policy think tank based at the Crawford School of Public Policy in the College of Asia and the Pacific at the Australian National University. Devpol independently conducts research on Australian aid policies and the development of Papua New Guinea and the Pacific Islands region.

Established in September 2010, the centre conducts research and discussions regarding Australian aid policies and development.

Devpol's director is Professor Stephen Howes, who co-founded the centre with its first deputy director, Matthew Morris. Robin Davies was the centre's associate director until 2017. Matthew Dornan was deputy director from 2016 to 2019. The current deputy director is Ryan Edwards. Devpol comprises a team of researchers and program staff, in addition to visiting fellows, centre associates, PhD students and interns.

== Devpolicy Blog ==
The Devpolicy Blog, managed by the Development Policy Centre (Devpol) features aid and development analysis, with a distinct focus on Australia, the Pacific and Papua New Guinea. The blog acts as a platform for current debate, analysis and discussion of topics such as development practice, economic and policy challenges in the region, and global development issues. The blog also summarizes research by Devpol and the broader development community.

== Publications ==
Devpol regularly publishes discussion papers, policy briefs and reports.

- Devpol's discussion paper series disseminates preliminary research relevant to the Development Policy Centre’s focus areas through the Social Science Research Network, with the aim of stimulating discussion and comment.
- Devpol's policy briefs are shorter documents, tied to specific, timely issues.
- Devpol's reports are larger research efforts, sometimes representing the culmination of a particular research project, and are not intended for subsequent journal publication.

Devpol also makes frequent submissions to relevant parliamentary inquiries and other consultations. All publications are available on the Devpolicy Blog.

Individual researchers at Devpol also write academic publications for journals and contribute to books, papers and reports in partnership with researchers from other institutions.

=== Asia & the Pacific Policy Studies ===
The editorial office Asia & the Pacific Policy Studies (APPS) journal is based in the Development Policy Centre in Canberra. Devpol director Professor Stephen Howes is the Editor-in-Chief, and is supported by an Editorial Board.

APPS is the journal of the Crawford School of Public Policy at The Australian National University. It is a peer-reviewed journal that targets policy-relevant research in Australia, Asia and the Pacific. Its disciplinary focus includes economics, political science, governance and development studies, and environmental management. The goal of the journal is to break down barriers across disciplines, and generate policy impact.

The journal is published online three times a year by Wiley. All APPS articles are open access and freely available to read and download from Wiley Online Library.

It is supported by the Department of Foreign Affairs and Trade through the Pacific Research Program.

== Events ==
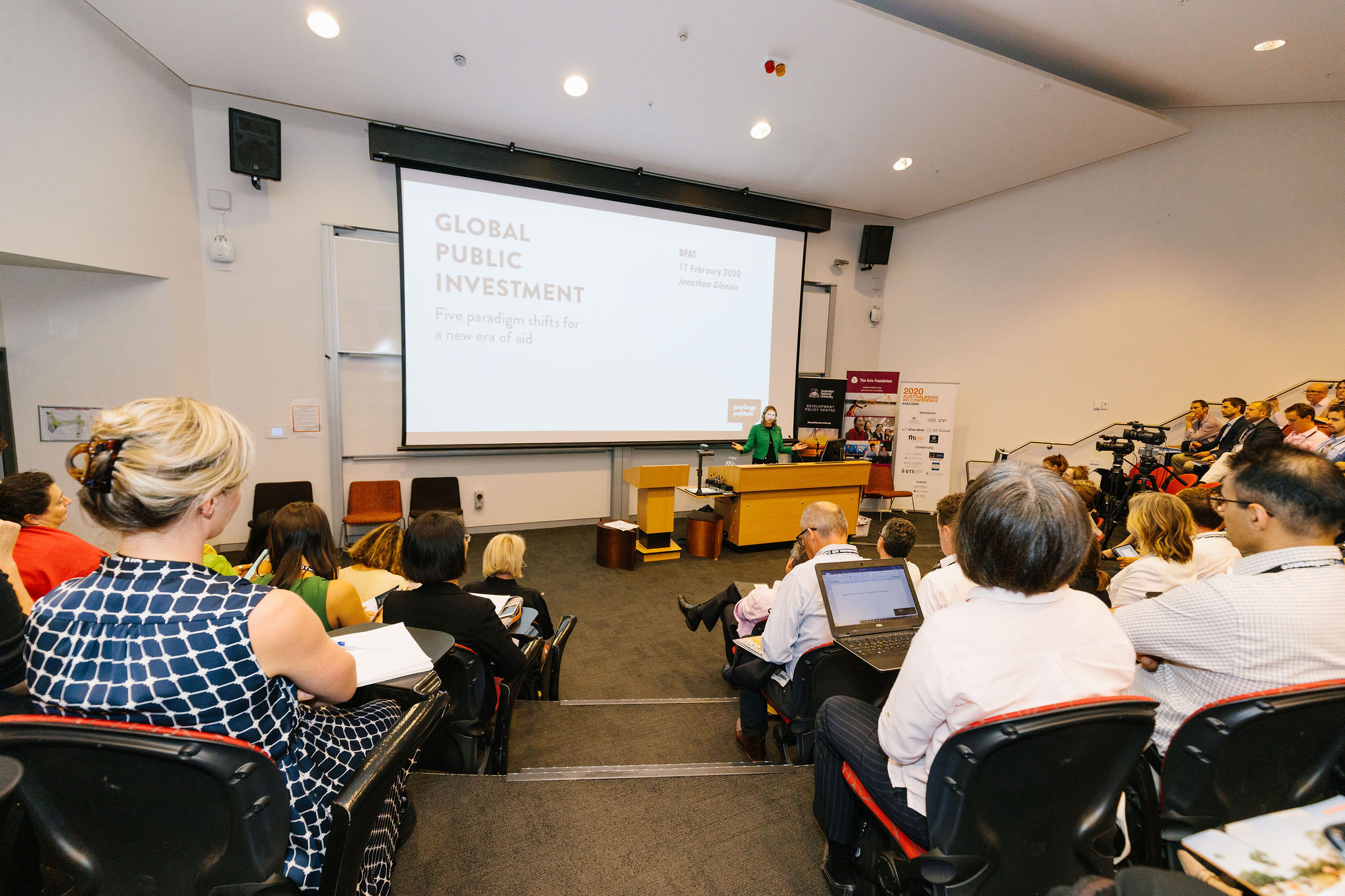
Australian Aid Conference 2020

Devpol regularly hosts public lectures, seminars and roundtables that feature discussions on development issues. Podcasts of most public events are made available on Devpol's website.

Some of the distinguished past speakers include:

- Emília Pires – Minister of Finance for East Timor
- Peter O'Neill – Prime Minister of Papua New Guinea
- Sri Mulyani – Former Finance Minister of Indonesia and current Managing Director of the World Bank
- Michael Spence – Nobel Prize–winning economist
- Thomas Pogge – Professor of Philosophy at Yale University
- Martin Ravallion – Professor of Economics at Georgetown University, and previous Director of Research at World Bank
- Mari Pangestu – Director-General of the World Trade Organisation and previous Minister of Trade of Indonesia
- Dame Carol Kidu DBE – only female Member of Parliament in Papua New Guinea until 2012 serving as Minister for Community Development
- Jeni Klugan – senior adviser at the World Bank
- Ume Wainetti – National Coordinator of the PNG Family and Sexual Violence Action Committee
- Keith Hansen – Vice President for Human Development at World Bank Group
- Radhika Coomaraswamy – Sri Lankan lawyer, diplomat and human rights advocate
- Dr Lant Pritchett – Research Director, RISE Programme; Fellow, Blavatnik School of Government, Oxford University
- Jonathan Glennie – Principal Associate, Joep Lange Institute

Panel events hosted by Devpol have included: Making Pacific Migration Work (2010), Measuring Poverty and Gender Disparity (2011), Tuberculosis Control in the Torres Strait Region forum (2012), Disability Inclusive Development Forum (2013), Gender Parity Forum (2014), Can the SDGs be Achieved by 2030? (2015), New Research on Pacific Labour Mobility (2016), Women, Peace and Security: A New Global Index (2017), PNG Aid Evaluation Forum: Drought, Roads and Health (2018), State Fragility and How to Escape It (2019), Measuring Development Impact: An Introduction (2020), Afghanistan’s Crisis: The Dangers of Genocide and Politicide (2021), and regular Australian Aid Evaluation forums in conjunction with DFAT's ODE.

=== Conferences ===
Since 2014, Devpol has hosted the annual Australasian Aid Conference in early February at The Australian National University, in conjunction with The Asia Foundation. It provides a forum for up-and-coming academics to present their research. In 2020, the event had more than 700 attendees, and keynotes and plenaries were livestreamed for an online audience. The conference was unable to be held in 2021 and 2022 due to the COVID-19 pandemic.

=== PNG and Pacific Updates ===
The PNG and Pacific Updates are annual events organised by Devpol in collaboration with the University of Papua New Guinea and the University of the South Pacific. These conferences provide a forum for the discussion of the latest economic, social and political developments in the region. The 2019 PNG Update was held in Port Moresby in August at the University of Papua New Guinea, while the 2019 Pacific Update was held in Suva in July at the University of the South Pacific. During the COVID-19 pandemic the PNG Update was replaced by a series ANU-UPNG seminars delivered on campus and online or exclusively online. The Pacific Update was held online in 2021.

=== Mitchell Oration ===
In 2012, the Mitchell Oration lecture series was created with support from the Harold Mitchell Foundation. Notable speakers have included Natalia Kanem, Executive Director of the United Nations Population Fund (UNFPA) and Donald Kaberuka, former President of the African Development Bank.

== Projects and partnerships ==
The Development Policy Centre works in partnership with a number of other research organisations. It has provided advice and analysis to, or worked in conjunction with, the Asian Development Bank, The Asia Foundation, AusAID (now DFAT), CARE (relief agency), the Center for Global Development, the International Initiative for Impact Evaluation, the Lowy Institute for International Policy, Oxfam, the Pacific Institute of Public Policy, the Government of Papua New Guinea, the World Bank, World Vision, OECD Development Assistance Committee, Overseas Development Institute, PNG’s National Research Institute, the University of Papua New Guinea and DFAT's Office of Development Effectiveness.

In addition to its core research agenda, Devpol runs several key projects and has a number of formalised partnerships with academic and research institutions in Papua New Guinea.

=== Papua New Guinea Budget Project ===
Together with PNG's National Research Institute, Devpol completed the Promoting Effective Public Expenditure (PEPE) Project to better understand how PNG allocates its public funds, and how funds are provided to and used by those responsible for delivering basic services. In 2012, 360 primary and health care clinics across eight provinces were surveyed. In 2014, the final report of the project was published.

=== Partnership with the University of Papua New Guinea ===
Devpol has had a strong and deepening relationship with the University of Papua New Guinea, in particular the School of Business and Public Policy. This partnership includes the co-hosting of the annual PNG Update conference, and initiatives to strengthen research and teaching of economics and public policy at UPNG, such as academic placements and exchanges. In 2022, Papua New Guinea: Government, economy and society was published by ANU Press. It is the result of the longstanding ANU-UPNG partnership. The book is edited by Devpol director Stephen Howes and dean of UPNG School of Business and Public Policy Lekshmi N. Pillai, with most contributors from the ANU and UPNG.

=== PNG Databases ===
Devpol has established open access databases for the PNG budget, for elections, members of parliament, and economic data. Databases are maintained by Devpol researchers for analysis and policy recommendations. The databases are freely available to researchers.

=== Femili PNG ===
Devpol provides pro-bono institutional support to Femili PNG, a local NGO in Papua New Guinea, which runs case management centres in Lae, Port Moresby and Goroka. Femili PNG works with clients, partners and communities to improve responses to family and sexual violence through case-management, partner support, training, monitoring, research and advocacy.

=== Pacific Research Program ===
The Pacific Research Program (PRP) consortium is led by the ANU Department of Pacific Affairs, in partnership with the Development Policy Centre and the Lowy Institute, and is co-funded by Australia’s Department of Foreign Affairs and Trade, and the consortium partners’ parent bodies. Devpol leads the PRP’s research into economic development and Pacific labour mobility, is co-host of the annual Pacific Update conference with the University of the South Pacific, and edits the Asia & the Pacific Policy Studies journal.

The Pacific labour mobility team undertakes research, and provides evidence-based policy advice, on the social and economic impacts of temporary labour migration programs between Pacific Island countries, and Australia and New Zealand. Work focuses on Australia’s Seasonal Worker Programme (SWP) and Pacific Labour Scheme (PLS) now known as the Pacific Australia Labour Mobility scheme (PALM), and New Zealand’s Recognised Seasonal Employer (RSE) scheme, and considers these temporary migration programs alongside other migration pathways open to Pacific Islanders within the region and other temporary migration programs globally.

=== Australian and New Zealand Aid Stakeholder Surveys ===
In 2013, Devpol launched the Australian aid stakeholder survey, and repeated the survey in 2015 and 2018, expanding it to cover New Zealand. The survey was designed to obtain feedback on the effectiveness of the Australian and New Zealand aid programs, and provide suggestions for their improvement. A full report of the 2013 survey, the 2015 survey, and the 2018 survey results was published, and it identified several areas where the Australian aid program could make improvements.

=== Greg Taylor Scholars ===
Devpol offers fellowships named after Greg Taylor AO (former Executive Director of the International Monetary Fund for both Australia and Papua New Guinea, and secretary of various Australian Government Departments) for research on economic development related to PNG or the Pacific for a period of two to three months. Devpol invites applications from students already studying at The Australian National University or elsewhere in Australia, and from emerging economics scholars in the Pacific and PNG.

=== Other research ===
Other key areas of work for the centre include infrastructure maintenance and funding in PNG and the Pacific, Australian aid and public opinion, analysis of the Papua New Guinean economy, corruption perceptions in Papua New Guinea, and work on global issues such as a climate change and development financing.

== Funding ==
In 2012, Devpol attracted a philanthropic donation from the Harold Mitchell Foundation, which was matched by the Australian National University. Additional funding was received in 2014 from the Bill & Melinda Gates Foundation, to scale up Devpol's research program on Australian and New Zealand aid. Devpol also receives funding from the Australian aid program for several of its projects.
