= Frank Jotzo =

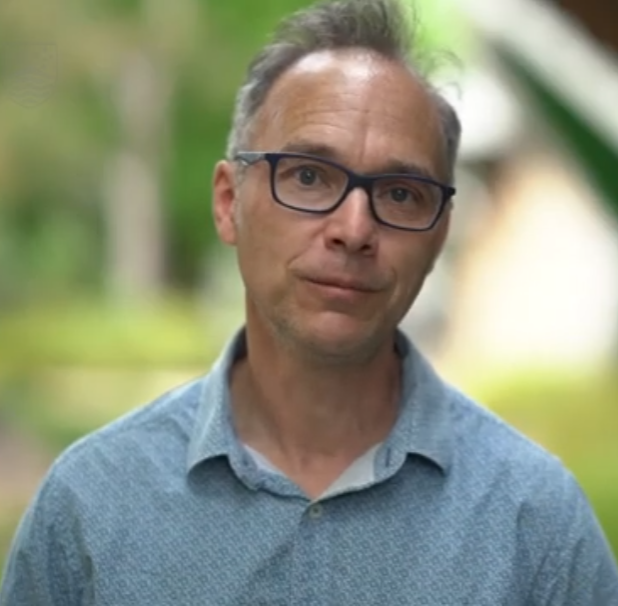
- In an ANU video in 2021
- Education: Humboldt University Berlin; Australian National University
- Occupation: Economics professor

Frank Jotzo is a professor of environmental economics and climate change economics at the Australian National University's Crawford School of Public Policy where he leads the Centre for Climate and Energy Policy. He is the Head of Energy at the ANU Institute for Climate, Energy & Disaster Solutions (ANU ICEDS) and the Director for the ANU Zero Carbon Energy for Asia-Pacific Grand Challenge initiative. His research focuses on policy relevant aspects of climate change, energy transition, and broader issues of environment, development and economic reform.

== Education ==
Jotzo obtained his doctorate and masters degrees from the Australian National University. His undergraduate studies was in economics in Humboldt University Berlin.

== Career ==
Jotzo has been on the faculty at the Australian National University (ANU) since 2006, and as full professor since 2017. He has held research leadership positions such as Head of Energy with the Institute for Climate Energy and Disaster Solutions (ICEDS) and various other university roles. Jotzo has held numerous roles in policy advisory to governments, in global climate change assessments and international research initiatives. Prior to joining academia, he worked as a research economist at Australian Bureau of Agricultural and Resource Economics (ABARE).

== Research and assessment ==
Jotzo held senior author roles with the Intergovernmental Panel on Climate Change including as Lead Author in Working Group II in the 6th and 5th Assessment Reports and member of the core writing team of the 6th Assessment Report Synthesis Report. He was the joint editor-in-chief of the journal Climate Policy during 2017 to 2023.

Jotzo has published more than 60 peer-reviewed journal articles as listed on Scopus, and many other publications, with over 6,000 citations of his work listed on Google Scholar. He regularly contributes to academic journalism and the media. In 2019, he was listed as one of the top 50 global "influencers on renewables and future of energy".

== Policy advisory ==
Jotzo has advised national and state governments, Australian businesses, international organisations, and multilateral government bodies. He regularly speaks at conferences and appears on a variety of media platforms. He has been involved in a number of policy research and advisory exercises for Australian federal governments, including as senior advisor to Australia's Garnaut Climate Change Review, and other reviews. During 2023-25 Jotzo was the lead of the Australian Government's Carbon Leakage Review. The review is intended to assess carbon leakage risks, develop related policies, and assess the feasibility of an Australian Carbon Border Adjustment Mechanism.

Jotzo has advised Australian state governments on climate change policy and related issues. He currently is a Commissioner with the New South Wales Net Zero Commission, and chairs the Queensland Clean Economy Expert Panel. Previously he was a member of the Australian Capital Territory's Climate Change Council and as a member of government advisory bodies to the States of Victoria, New South Wales and South Australia. He has also advised Indonesia's Minister and Ministry of Finance on a climate change strategy.

== Advisory boards ==
- Potsdam Institute (PIK), member of the Scientific Advisory Board (since 2025); Mercator Institute for Global Commons and Climate Change, Chair of International Expert Advisory Board (2017 to 2024)
- China Council for International Cooperation on Environment and Development, member of special policy studies (since 2016)
- Climate Strategies international expert network, Member (since 2015)
- Economic Society of Australia, Member of National Economic Panel (since 2023)

== Editorial boards ==
- Climate Policy journal, former joint editor in chief (2017-2023) and editorial board member (2011-2014 and since 2024)
- Economics of Energy and Environmental Policy, Editorial Board Member (since 2017)
- Australian Journal of Agricultural and Resource Economics, associate editor (2013-2016)

== Publications ==
- Frank Jotzo ANU Research Profile
