= East Asian Bureau of Economic Research =

Economic research forum

- Website type: Research organisation
- Website: eaber.org
- Launched: 17 October 2006

The East Asian Bureau of Economic Research (EABER) is a forum for economic research and analysis of the major issues facing the economies of East Asia.

Based at the Crawford School of Public Policy at the Australian National University, it coordinates a network of think tanks and research institutions throughout the region including representatives from Japan, China, South Korea, Vietnam, Cambodia, Laos, Thailand, Malaysia, the Philippines, Indonesia and Australia.

EABER's primary role is the coordination of collaborative research projects on topics relating to the Asian economy. Recent projects have focused on the Asian Century, the impact of Chinese ODI and the role of the G20 in Asia. Bringing together expertise from across the region, EABER also hosts a series of academic conferences and public policy events to share and disseminate ideas on the Asian economy. The East Asia Forum - an EABER-run online publication - provides a platform for the latest research, accessible to policymakers, the wider academic community, and members of the public.

== History ==
EABER was established by Professor Peter Drysdale, the current Director, to provide greater access to quality economic analysis through building research capacity and developing partnerships within the academic and policy community throughout the region. It was officially launched, alongside the EAF, in 2006, by the then Treasurer, Peter Costello.

== Aims ==
EABER seeks to promote the integration of Asian economies through research that establishes and measures the potential for integration, and identifies barriers that exist.

EABER aims to improve the policy making process by providing evidence-based economic analysis to policy-makers, and by fostering stronger ties between academic and policy communities.

EABER establishes links between academics and institutions throughout the Asia-Pacific region, seeking to promote debate, encourage cooperation, and improve the communication of ideas.

== Events ==
EABER regularly organises high-profile conferences and public forums.

Recent events have included:

- The Asian Trade Strategies Workshop and Public Forum in September 2013, at the Australian National University
- The Chinese Global Investment roundtable in July 2013, at the Australian National University
- The G20 at 5 conference in June 2013, at the Brookings Institution, Washington
- The Coming to Terms with Asia conference in June 2013, at Columbia University, New York
- The Asian Demography seminar in May 2013, at the Crawford School of Public Policy
- The Back to School with China Partnership in May 2013, with the China Central Party School, at the ANU College of Asia and the Pacific
- The Australia-China Dialogue on the G20 and Regional Initiatives roundtable in January 2013, at the Shanghai Institutes for International Studies, Shanghai
- The APEC's Regional and Global Opportunities conference in October 2012, at the Centre for Strategic and International Studies, Jakarta
- The China's Global Investment roundtable in September 2012, at the Australian National University
- The Thinking About The Asian Century roundtable and public forum in April 2012, at the Crawford School of Public Policy

EABER also organises the Pacific Trade and Development (PAFTAD) conference series.

== Members ==
The East Asian Bureau of Economic Research cooperates with key research institutes in Asia, including:

- The Crawford School of Public Policy, Australian National University, Australia
- The Economic Institute of Cambodia, Cambodia
- The China Center for Economic Research, Peking University, China
- The Department of Economics and Finance, City University of Hong Kong, China
- The Centre for Strategic and International Studies, Indonesia
- The SMERU Research Institute, Indonesia
- The Policy Research Institute, Ministry of Finance, Japan
- The Malaysian Institute for Economic Research, Malaysia
- The Philippines Institute for Development Studies, the Philippines
- The Wee Kim Wee Centre, Singapore Management University, Singapore
- Singapore Centre for Applied and Policy Economics, Singapore
- The Korean Institute for Economic Policy, South Korea
- The Fiscal Policy Research Institute, Ministry of Finance, Thailand
- The Central Institute for Economic Management, Ministry of Planning and Investment, Vietnam
- The Energy Research Institute (ERI), National Development and Reform Commission, China
- The Japan Institute of Energy Economics (IEE), Japan
- The Korea Energy Economics Institute (KEEI), South Korea
- The Institute of Asia-Pacific Studies, China Academy of Social Sciences (CASS), China
- The Institute of World Economics and Politics (IWEP), China Academy of Social Sciences (CASS), China
- The School of Finance, Renmin University of China, China
- Australia-Japan Research Centre, Australian National University, Australia
- Asia Development Bank Institute, Tokyo, Japan
- Dhurakij Pundit University Research Center, Bangkok, Thailand

== Affiliations ==
EABER is affiliated with:

- The East Asia Forum (EAF)
- The South Asia Bureau of Economic Research (SABER)
