= Huang Yiping =

Chinese professor

- 黄益平
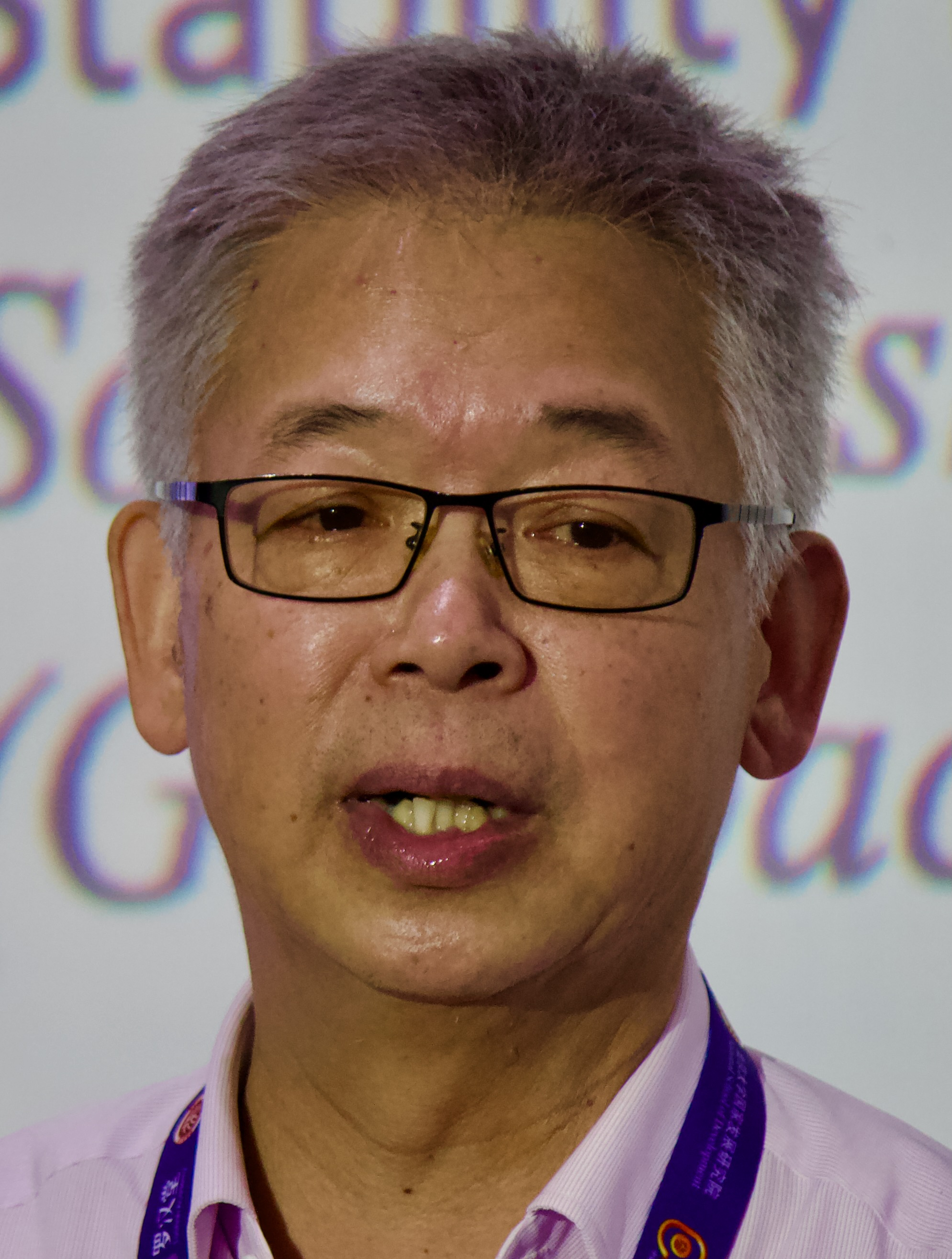
- Huang in 2025
- Born: 1964 (age 60–61)
- Education: Zhejiang A & F University; Renmin University of China; Australian National University
- Occupation(s): Economist, banker, editor, professor

Huang Yiping (黄益平; born 1964) is the president of the National School of Development at Peking University. He is a highly recognized expert of financial services in China.

== Education and academic career ==
Huang was born in 1964. He graduated B.S. in agriculture from Zhejiang A & F University in 1984; M.A. in economics from Renmin University of China in 1987; and Ph.D. in economics from Australian National University in 1994, where Peter Drysdale was his supervisor. In the later 1990s he taught at ANU, and at Columbia Business School as General Mills International Professor of Finance and Economics.

He joined the Economics faculty of Peking University in 2009.

He is editor of China Economic Journal and an associate editor of Asian Economic Policy Review.

== Business affiliations ==
From 2000 to 2009 Huang worked for Citigroup in Hong Kong, as managing director and chief Asia economist. He has also been chief economist for Caixin Media Group. In 2011 he joined Barclays Capital as managing director and chief economist, emerging Asia, on leave from Peking University.

In 2013 he became an independent director of China Life Insurance Company and MYBank. He has also served on the board of Minmetal Trust Ltd.

In August 2020, he became an independent member of the board of directors of Ant Group.

In February 2025, he was appointed as a member on the Hong Kong Stock Exchange's China Business Advisory Committee.

== Domestic policy work ==
Between 2015 and 2018, Huang was a member of the Monetary Policy Committee of the People's Bank of China.

As of 2020, he is Vice Chairman of Council at the Public Policy Research Center and Research Fellow at the Financial Research Center, both at the Counsellors' Office of the State Council of the People's Republic of China.

He has also chaired the Special Committee on Fintech Development and Research of the National Internet Finance Association of China (NIFA), and is the Chairman of the Academic Committee of the China Finance 40 Forum (CF40).

In March 2024, he was once again appointed to the Monetary Policy Committee of the People's Bank of China.

== International engagement ==
Huang was among the participants in the 2011 Bilderberg Conference and 2012 Bilderberg Conference. He had several publications for the Bank for International Settlements.

In October 2018, International Monetary Fund Managing Director Christine Lagarde appointed him to its External Advisory Group on Surveillance.
