= William H. Overholt =

American academic (1945–2024)

- Born: William Henry Overholt; March 7, 1945
- Died: September 27, 2024 (aged 79)
- Education: Harvard University (B.A. magna); Yale University (Master of Philosophy and Ph.D.)
- Occupations: Senior Research Fellow at John F. Kennedy School of Government’s Mossavar-Rahmani Center for Business and Government at Harvard University and Principal of AsiaStrat LLC
- Known for: Author, strategist, expert on Asian politics and economics

Dr. William H. Overholt (March 7, 1945 – September 27, 2024) was a senior research fellow at John F. Kennedy School of Government's Mossavar-Rahmani Center for Business and Government at Harvard University and principal of AsiaStrat LLC, a consulting firm.

Overholt is an expert on Asia and US-Asia relations, with a long history of analyzing Asia for both the public and private sectors. He has served as political advisor to several of Asia's major political figures and has done consulting projects for Korea Development Institute, The Nuclear Threat Initiative, the Philippine Department of Agrarian Reform, and Thailand's Ministry of Universities. His consulting experience ranges from strategic planning to foreign affairs to economic development to political strategy for the Conference Board, U.S. Army Strategic Studies Institute, the Foreign Service Institute, Dean Witter Reynolds, A.G. Becker & Co., MacMillan Bloedel, Honda Motor Company, Tong Yang Securities, 13-D Research, Matterhorn Palmyra Fund, and numerous other corporations and political leaders.

He is the author or co-author of nine books, including North Korea: Peace? Nuclear War? (Harvard Research Centers, 2019); China's Crisis of Success (Cambridge University Press, 2018); Renminbi Rising: A New Global Monetary System Emerges (Wiley, 2016); and Asia, America and the Transformation of Geopolitics (Cambridge University Press, 2008). The Rise of China (W.W. Norton, 1993, and many foreign language editions) was the first book to predict China's economic and geopolitical success and won the Mainichi News/Asian Affairs Research Center Special Book Prize. His work on forecasting methods includes books on Political Risk (Euromoney, 198_) and (with William Ascher) Strategic Planning and Forecasting (Wiley, 1983). He edited the first book on nuclear proliferation and nuclear strategies in Asia, Asia’s Nuclear Future (Praeger, 1976). His edited volume, The Future of Brazil (Praeger, 1978) evolved from a country risk study that inspired considerable early work in the field of political risk analysis. In addition, with Zbigniew Brzezinksi, he founded Global Political Assessment in 1976 at Columbia University's Research Institute on International Change and edited the semi-annual periodical until 1985.

Overholt's political advising has included intense involvement in Zimbabwe’s movement to independence (1979–1981), South Korean domestic conflicts in 1980, the Philippine revolution of 1986, Burma’s insurgent wars of the late 1980s, and Hong Kong’s transition. He served as head of the Asia Policy Task Force for the 39th President of the United States Jimmy Carter’s campaign in 1976.

== Education ==
Overholt received his B.A. (magna, 1968) from Harvard University and his Master of Philosophy (1970) and Ph.D. (1972) from Yale University.

== Career ==
Overholt has been a researcher at Harvard University since 2008. He is currently senior research fellow at John F. Kennedy School of Government's Mossavar-Rahmani Center for Business and Government. Previously, he was senior fellow at Harvard University Asia Center and senior research fellow at Harvard's John F. Kennedy School of Government's Ash Center for Democratic Governance and Innovation. Concurrently, he served as senior fellow and president of Fung Global Institute in Hong Kong from 2013 to 2015 and is principal of AsiaStrat LLC, a consulting firm.

He held the Asia Policy Distinguished Research Chair at RAND Corporation’s California headquarters from 2002 to 2008 and was director of RAND's Center for Asia Pacific Policy. During his time at RAND he held concurrent appointments as distinguished visiting professor at Yonsei University in South Korea and as visiting professor at Shanghai Jiao Tong University in China. In 2002 Overholt was joint senior fellow at Harvard University's Asia Center and the Harvard Kennedy School's Center for Business and Government.

During 21 previous years in investment banking, he served as head of strategy and economics at Nomura Research Institute’s regional headquarters in Hong Kong from 1998 to 2001, and as managing director and head of research at BankBoston's regional headquarters in Singapore. At Bankers Trust, he ran a country risk team in New York from 1980 to 1984, then was regional strategist and Asia research head based in Hong Kong from 1985 to 1998.

At Hudson Institute 1971 to 1979, Overholt directed planning studies for the United States Department of Defense, United States Department of State, National Security Council, National Aeronautics and Space Administration, and Council on International Economic Policy. As Director of Hudson Research Services, he did strategic planning for corporations.

Overholt has served on the Boards of the Pacific Century Institute, the Korea Society, the Jeju International Advisory Board, Asia Policy Point, Chinese Culture Connection, and the International Center for Conciliation. He was a Governor of the American Chamber of Commerce in Hong Kong and an executive committee member of the Business and Professionals Federation of Hong Kong, both for six years. He has served on advisory boards for Harvard University's Asia Center; the US-China Institute of the University of Southern California; the Asia Society of Southern California; the Hang Lung Center for Organizational Research at Hong Kong University of Science and Technology; and Chinavest Ltd.

== Publications ==
In addition to his books, Overholt is the author of dozens of articles, presentations, speeches, and Congressional testimony.

- China: The next economic Superpower, 1993
