= Yacob Mulugetta =

British-African professor

- Scientific career
- Fields: Energy systems and development; energy systems and climate change; and political economy of low carbon development.
- Institutions: University College, London

Yacob Mulugetta is a British-African professor of Energy and Development Policy and the Director of MPA programme at the Department of Science, Technology, Engineering & Public Policy, University College London. He is a member of African Academy of Sciences (ACPC) He was the Lead Coordinating Author of the 5th Assessment Report of the Intergovernmental Panel on Climate Change by Energy Systems chapter and he is one of the founding members of the African Climate Policy Centre (ACPC)

== Research areas ==
Yacob's research revolves around three interwoven areas which are; energy systems and development; energy systems and climate change; and political economy of low carbon development.
