= Naomi Koshi =

Japanese lawyer; former mayor of Otsu, Japan

- 越 直美
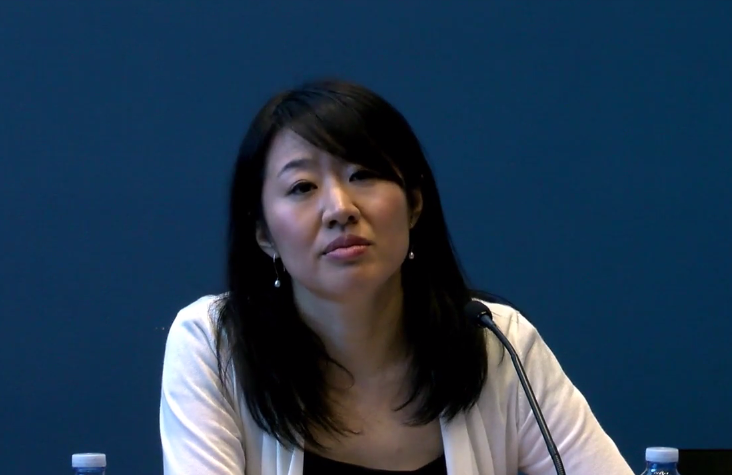
- Koshi at Australian National University in 2016

Mayor of Ōtsu
- In office January 25, 2012 – January 24, 2020
- Preceded by: Makoto Mekata
- Succeeded by: Kenji Satō

Personal details
- Born: July 5, 1975 (age 51) Ibaraki, Osaka, Japan
- Party: Independent
- Education: Hokkaido University; Harvard University
- Occupation: Lawyer

Naomi Koshi (越 直美; born July 5, 1975) is a Japanese lawyer and advocate for gender equality and retired politician. In 2012 she became the youngest woman elected mayor of a Japanese city as the Mayor of Ōtsu, Shiga Prefecture for two four-year terms from January 2012 to January 2020.

== Early life and education ==
As a child, Koshi was inspired to become a politician when her mother had to leave her job for 10 years to take care of Koshi's grandmother. The mother had no assistance from the government.

Koshi graduated from Shiga Prefectural Zeze High School and received her undergraduate degree in law from Hokkaido University. In 2000, Koshi passed the bar exam and became a lawyer at Nishimura & Asahi. Koshi also worked as an adjunct professor at Waseda University in 2005.

In 2009, Koshi received a master's degree in international law from Harvard Law School. Her thesis was titled Takeover Defense in Japan. She then passed the New York State bar exam and worked for Debevoise & Plimpton LLP. Koshi was a visiting fellow at Columbia University's Center on Japanese Economy and Business from September 2010 until January 2011, while undergoing traineeship at the United Nations' legal department.

== Mayorship ==
In 2012 Koshi was elected mayor of Ōtsu, Shiga Prefecture, Japan. She is the youngest woman to be elected as mayor of a city in Japan. During her time in office Koshi has advocated for gender equality measures that would make it easier for women to stay in the workforce after having children, such as improving access to childcare and parental leave.

In 2015 Koshi was selected as a Young Global Leader by the World Economic Forum.

In 2018, Koshi and Tomoko Nakagawa, mayor of Takarazuka, Hyogo, also pressed the Japan Sumo Association to change some of its gender-based rules after a female nurse who entered the sumo ring to conduct CPR was ordered out of the ring because only men are allowed in.

In November 2019, Koshi announced that she would not seek reelection as Otsu mayor for a third term. She also stated that she had no intention to seek another political office.

== Selected bibliography ==
- Shinkawa, Asa; Fukuzawa, Mihoko; Koshi, Naomi (2005). "Dai 3 shō: Soshiki saihen kōi" (Tokushū emu ando ē jigyō saisei no shiten kara mita shin kaishahō kyū ando ē (85-mon))" [Chapter 3: The deed of turnaround (Feature: Turnaround with M&A under new Company Law, 85 Q&As.)]. The Turnaround & Credit Management. 19 (3). Kinyū zaisei jijōkenkyūkai: 74–94. ISSN 1348-8953.
- Koshi, Naomi; Kubo, Kimiko (May 2012). "Wakasa/keikenbusoku eno fuan wo hanenokete: fukushi/josei no shiten ga genten — 36-sai no Otsu-shicho Koshi Naomi san ni kiku" [Fighting back the Anxieties against a young and an inexperienced: From the viewpoint of welfare and women — interview with a 36-year-old Mayor of Otsu, Naomi Koshi]. Josei Tenbo (in Japanese) (647). Ichikawa Fusae Memorial Woman and Politics Center Publication: 8–10. ISSN 1345-7098.
- Koshi, Naomi (2014). Kyōshitsu no ijime to tatakau: Ōtsu ijime jiken josei shichō no kaikaku [Bullying and Teasing in the Classroom: Otsu Bullying Case, Reformation led by the Female Mayor] (First ed.). Tōkyō: Wani bukkusu. ISBN 9784847065538. OCLC 892815261.
- Koshi, Naomi (2018). "Jichitai-kan kyōsō: Sono sakini (dai 19-kai ajiataiheiyō fōramu Awaji kaigi 'kokusai shinpojiumu' toshi wa kyōsō suru: Sōzō-sei to tayō-sei) — (paneru disukasshon — toshi no kokusai-kyōsōchikara o sasaeru seichō senryaku)" [Competition among Local Governments: What awaits beyond that (The 19th Asia-Pacific Forum: Awaji Conference 'International Symposium on Cities and Competition: Creativity and Diversity — Panel Discussion on Growth Strategies to Support International Competitiveness for Cities)]. 21st Century Hyogo: Research Information Magazine, Hyogo Earthquake Memorial 21st Century Research Bureau (in Japanese) (25). Hyogo Earthquake Memorial 21st Century Research Bureau: 93–96. ISSN 1345-9368.

Political offices
Preceded by Makoto Mekata	Mayor of Otsu, Shiga; 2012–2020	Succeeded by Kenji Sato
