= Michael E. Clarke =

Australian political scientist

Michael E. Clarke is an Australian political scientist, Adjunct Professor from Canberra-based Australian National University, and Senior Fellow at the Centre for Defence Research at the Australian Defence College. He is former executive director of Centre for Defence Studies, King's College London. His major areas of research and publication include Xinjiang's history and politics, Chinese foreign and security policy, American grand strategy, and nuclear issues. Clarke regularly provides expert media commentary on Uyghur/Xinjiang and Chinese foreign policy-related issues to international media.

== Publications ==
External videos
- 'The Xinjiang emergency' – in conversation with Michael Clarke (University of Technology Sydney, 2022)
- Michael Clarke, Beijing’s "March West": One Belt, One Road and China’s Quest for Great Power Status (Central Asia Program, 2016)

=== Monographs ===
- The Xinjiang Emergency: Exploring the Causes and Consequences of China’s Mass Detention of Uyghurs (Manchester University Press, 2022)
- American Grand Strategy and National Security: The Dilemmas of Primacy and Decline from the Founding to Trump (Palgrave Macmillan, 2021)
- Xinjiang and China’s Rise in Central Asia – A History (Routledge, 2011)

=== Edited volumes ===
- The Palgrave Handbook of National Security (Palgrave Macmillan, 2022)
- The Belt and Road Initiative and the Future of Regional Order in the Indo-Pacific (Lexington Books, 2020)
- Terrorism and Counterterrorism in China: Domestic and Foreign Policy Dimensions (Oxford University Press, 2018)
- Inside Xinjiang: Space, place and power in China's Muslim far Northwest (Routledge, 2018)
- China's Frontier Regions: Ethnicity, Economic Integration and Foreign Relations (Bloomsbury Publishing, 2016)
- Australia's Nuclear Policy Reconciling Strategic, Economic and Normative Interests (Routledge, 2015)
- Pakistan's Stability Paradox: Domestic, Regional and International Dimensions (Routledge, 2012)
- China, Xinjiang and Central Asia: History, Transition and Crossborder Interaction into the 21st Century (Routledge, 2011)
- Australia's Uranium Trade: The Domestic and Foreign Policy Challenges of a Contentious Export (Routledge, 2011)
