= Currency Reform for Fair Trade Act 2010 =

Legislative history
- Introduced in the House by Tim Ryan (D-OH)

The Currency Reform for Fair Trade Act 2010 was a bill by the Congress of the United States that sought punitive trade tariffs on countries that have perceived unfair competitive advantaged by such measures as currency manipulation.

The Act followed controversy as to China artificially keeping the yuan lower than its actual value (some say by at least 20%). Further to China there were other countries, most notably Japan, that took measures to weaken their currency.

== Bill ==
The bill was introduced by Rep. Timothy Ryan [D-OH] on 13 May 2010. It was passed on to the House Ways and Means committee and the Senate Finance committee on 28 September 2010. The following day it was passed in the House of Representatives by a vote of 348 in favour, 79 opposed and 6 abstentions.

The House bill amended the Tariff Act of 1930 in that this version require the president's administration to: (1) determine, based on certain requirements, if the currency exchange rate of a country that exports goods or services to the US is "fundamentally and actionably undervalued or overvalued" against the American dollar for an 18-month period; and (2) should there be deemed a violation, the administration should to take action in the form of a "countervailing duty or antidumping duty" so as to offset such a misalignment. It also said the currency of a non-market economy would be subject to the provisions of the Act.

=== Amendments ===
An amendment was offered in the House committee, and was adopted.
