= Crawford School of Public Policy =

School of Australian National University, Canberra

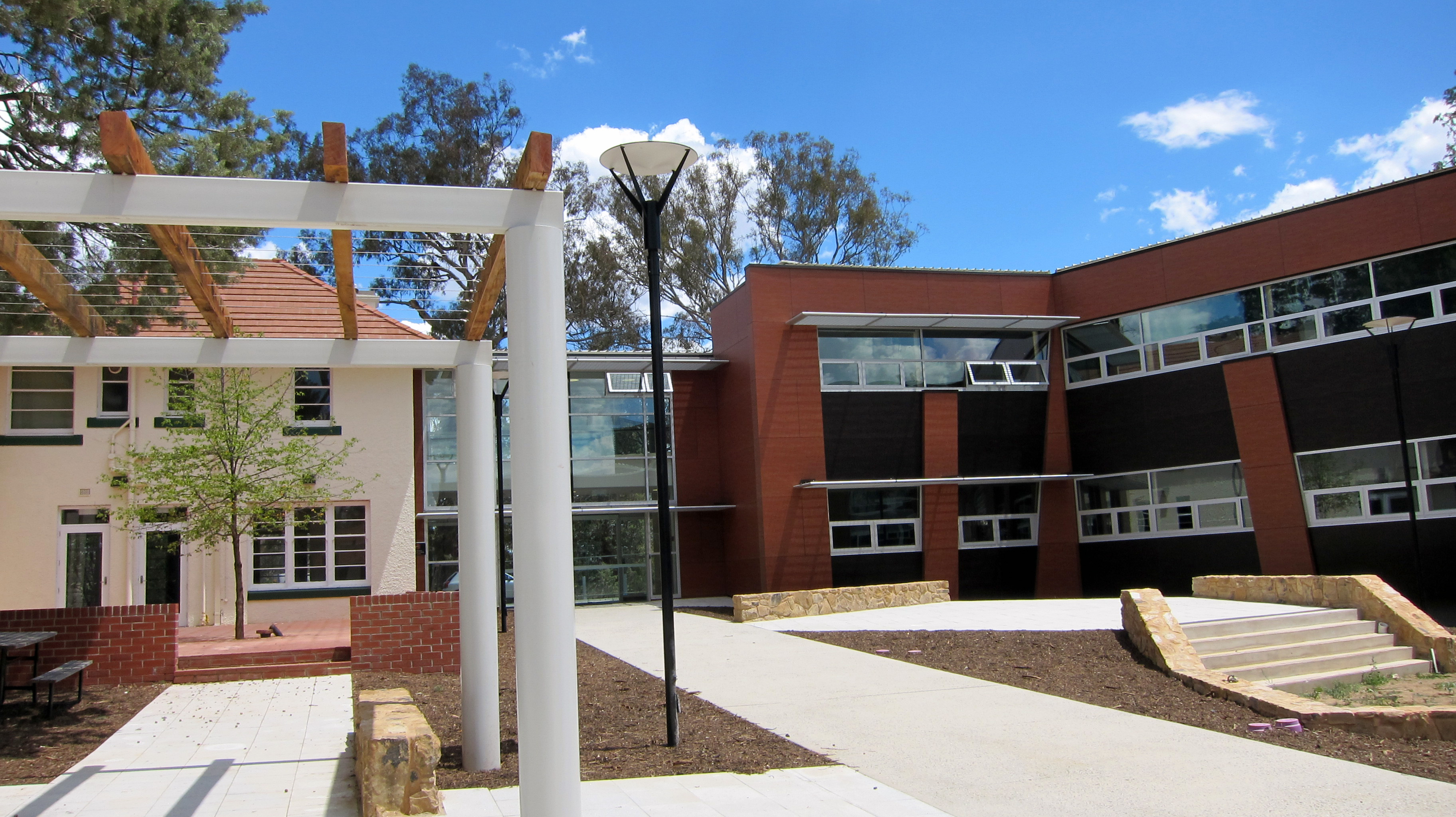
Old Canberra House and the new JG Crawford Building

Crawford School of Public Policy is a research-intensive policy school within the ANU College of Law, Governance and Policy at The Australian National University which focuses on Australia and the Asia-Pacific region. The school was named after Sir John Crawford, and its current director is Professor Janine O'Flynn.

The Crawford School has disciplinary and interdisciplinary expertise in public policy, economics, political science, national security, aid, development, and environmental management.

== The JG Crawford Building ==
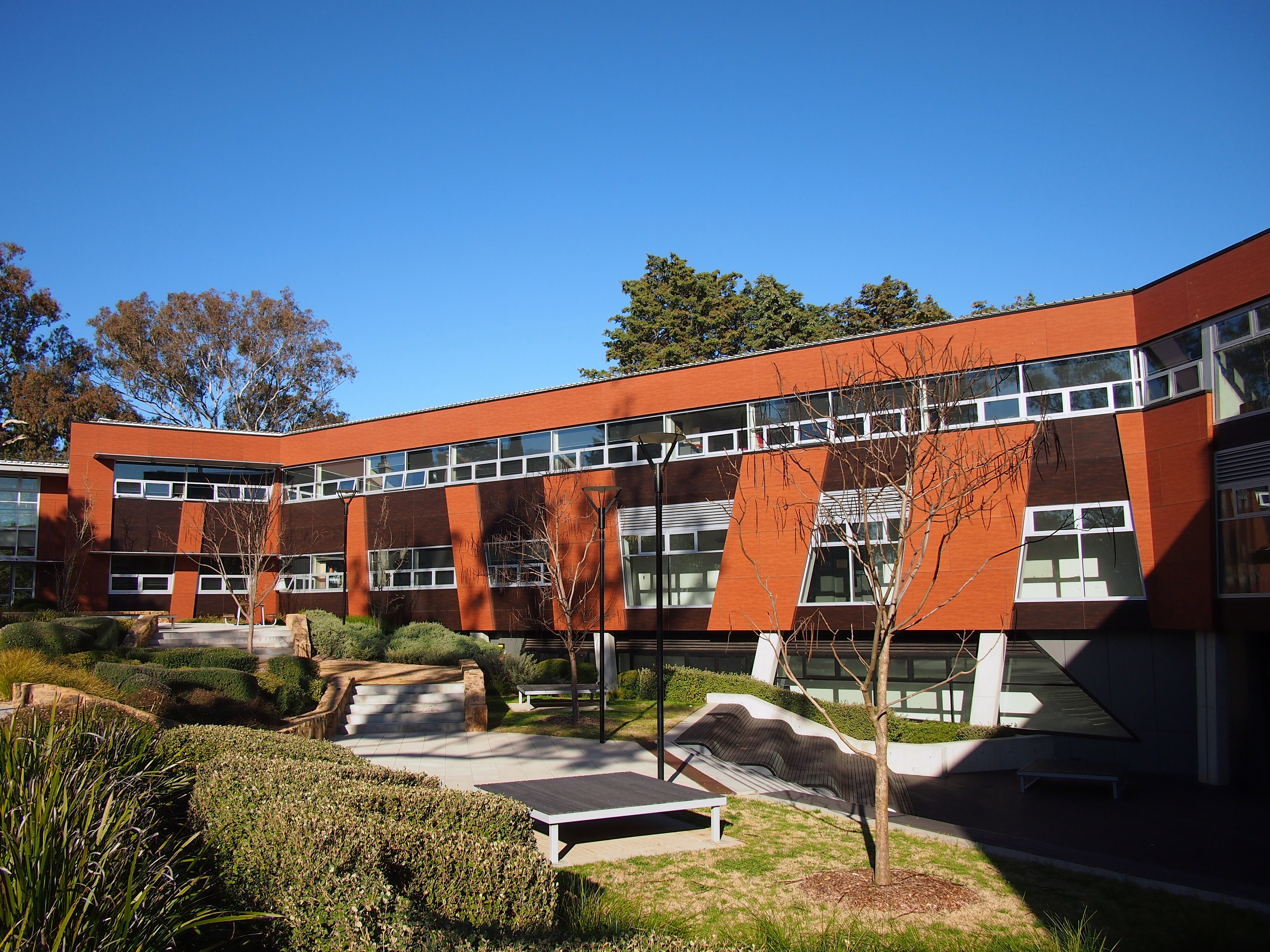
The southern wing of the JG Crawford Building

In 2009, the school moved to a new mini-campus overlooking Lake Burley Griffin in Canberra. The school building is located on Acton Peninsula adjacent to Old Canberra House and the WEH Stanner building.

The building links the two existing buildings, providing consolidated accommodation for staff and students of the school. There is a surrounding courtyard which forms a mini-campus. An extension to the Crawford School, the GJ Yeend Wing Building, was opened by Australian Prime Minister Julia Gillard on 23 January 2013.

== Research Centres at Crawford ==
Within Crawford School, academics have clustered their research into centres. These organized research units are funded independently through grants, consultancies or other contracts.

=== Australia-Japan Research Centre (AJRC) ===
The Australia-Japan Research Centre (AJRC) conducts research to explore and improve understanding of the economies and economic policy processes in Australia and Japan and both countries' strategic interests in the Asia-Pacific economy. Its policy-oriented areas of interest cover developments in regional economic cooperation and integration and encompass research on trade, finance, macroeconomics and structural and regulatory reform, as well as international economic relations.

=== Centre for Applied Macroeconomic Analysis (CAMA) ===
The Centre for Applied Macroeconomic Analysis (CAMA) is located in the Crawford School of Public Policy at the Australian National University and was established in 2003 to bring together economists working on applied macroeconomic and international market issues throughout Australia and across the globe. CAMA's objectives are to advance research and post-graduate training in applied macroeconomic and financial issues.

=== Centre for Climate Economics and Policy (CCEP) ===
The Centre for Climate Economics and Policy (CCEP) aims to provide insights on the economics of climate change and its implications for public policy. This includes the analysis of cutting greenhouse gas emissions and the anthropogenic factors driving climate change, as well as adaptation to climate change impacts. The focus is on Australia and the countries of the Asia-Pacific region. CCEP is a network of researchers who are experts in different aspects of climate change economics and policy analysis who share an active interest in informing public policy.

=== Centre for Water Economics, Environment and Policy (CWEEP) ===
The goal of the Centre of Water Economics, Environment and Policy (CWEEP) is to provide technical and public policy insights into managing water under climate variability and climate change, urban water supply and demand management, water markets, water pricing, trans-boundary water governance, and water management practices that promote environmental sustainability.

=== Children's Policy Centre (CPC) ===
The Children's Policy Centre (CPC) undertakes inter-disciplinary research on issues relating to children's policy. The centre aims to contribute to both policy and scholarship, focusing on children's participation, child protection, and overcoming child poverty and disadvantage. Associate Professor Sharon Bessell is the director of the centre.

=== China Economy and Business Program (CEBP) ===
The China Economy and Business Program (CEBP) is home to the strongest concentration of research outside China on the Chinese economy. The program is a joint undertaking of the Crawford School and the Research School of Pacific and Asian Studies with the program administered by the Crawford School. CEBP coordinates projects into relevant external communities like the research of ANU-based scholars on the Chinese economy and business.

=== Development Policy Centre (DPC) ===
The Development Policy Centre (DPC) is an aid and development policy think tank. The DPC emerged at a time of unprecedented growth in the Australian aid program. It researches and promotes discussion of aid effectiveness, the Pacific Islands (including Papua New Guinea), and development policy. The centre hosts events and runs both the blog Devpol Blog that is updated frequently, and a website that contains regularly updated information on the centre, discussion papers, policy briefs and reports.

=== East Asian Bureau of Economic Research (EABER) ===
The Crawford School houses both the secretariats for the East Asia Forum (EAF) and the East Asian Bureau of Economic Research (EABER). The EAF brings together Australia's expertise on East Asia, publishing 2 articles daily and releasing a quarterly magazine, the East Asia Forum Quarterly (EAFQ). EABER and EAF were officially launched in Australia at the ANU in Canberra on the 17th of October in 2007. EABER was launched internationally by Indonesia's Coordinating Minister for Economic Affairs, Boediono, in Bogor in 2005.

=== Social Policy Institute (SPI) ===
The Social Policy Institute (SPI) launched in June 2013 and takes on multi-disciplinary and collaborative research on social policy issues in Australia and internationally. It aims to inform and contribute to policy-making processes and foster networks and promote collaboration between researchers, policymakers and practitioners and the community on social policy issues.

=== Tax and Transfer Policy Institute (TTPI) ===
The Tax and Transfer Policy Institute (TTPI) was established at Crawford School in 2013, with a start-up endowment from the Australian Treasury.

The establishment of the institute implemented Recommendation 134 of the Review of Australia's Future Tax System (2009). In February 2014, Professor Miranda Stewart was appointed as the inaugural director of the institute, and Dr. John Hewson AM was appointed as the inaugural professor and chair.

== Asia and the Pacific Policy Studies (APPST) ==
The Asia and the Pacific Policy Studies (APPST) is the journal of Crawford School. It is a peer-reviewed journal that targets research in policy studies in Australia, Asia and the Pacific.

The journal has funding support from the Australian Department of Foreign Affairs and Trade and is published online three times a year by Wiley. As it is open-access, all papers are freely available to read online and download.

== Asia and the Pacific Policy Society (APPSO) ==
The Asia and the Pacific Policy Society (APPSO) is a community of scholars, policymakers, researchers, students and the policy-engaged public. It is an international association linking people engaged in public policy working across academic disciplines in the region. The society is based in the Crawford School of Public Policy, The society was launched in July 2012 by the then Shadow Communications Minister, Malcolm Turnbull.

The society supports the journal, Asia and the Pacific Policy Studies, and works to position academic research in the discussion of public policy in the region. The Membership is free and a conference is held each year.

The society's APPSO Policy Forum is a public policy website specializing in Asia and the Pacific. Policyforum.net publishes essays, opinions and analysis on public policy challenge throughout the region and the world. Published authors include academics, former prime ministers, people employed by NGOs and postgraduate students.

== Criticism and controversies ==
During the 2024–2025 "Renew ANU" institutional restructuring, the Crawford School became the subject of public debate regarding its academic identity and governance. In July 2025, former Australian Foreign Minister and former ANU Chancellor Gareth Evans publicly criticized the university's decision to relocate the school out of its traditional home in the ANU College of Asia and the Pacific into the newly formed College of Law, Governance and Policy, alongside the apparent abandonment of the ANU Crawford Leadership Forum. Critics and academic staff argued that the broader university cost-cutting program damaged institutional morale and risked diluting the school's specialized Asia-Pacific focus, whereas university leadership maintained that the realignment was necessary to reduce administrative duplication and address financial deficits.

== Notable personnel ==
- John Hewson, former Leader of the Opposition, economist and director of Macquarie Bank
- Frank Jotzo, environmental economist (CCEP)
