= 2025 in Wales =

- Centuries: 19th; 20th; 21st
- Decades: 2000s; 2010s; 2020s
- See also: List of years in Wales; Timeline of Welsh history 2025 in The United Kingdom England Scotland Elsewhere

Events from the year 2025 in Wales.

== Incumbents ==
- First Minister – Eluned Morgan
- Llywydd of the Senedd – Elin Jones
- Secretary of State for Wales – Jo Stevens
- Archbishop of Wales
  - Andy John, Bishop of Bangor (until July)
  - Cherry Vann, Bishop of Monmouth (after July)
- Archdruid of the National Eisteddfod of Wales – Mererid Hopwood
- National Poet of Wales – Hanan Issa

== Events ==
=== January ===
- 1 January
  - The Met Office issues a yellow weather warning for snow in Wales for the weekend of 4–5 January.
  - The mystery runner at the Nos Galan race is revealed as boxer Lauren Price.
  - The Welsh Ambulance Service officially declares the end of a "critical incident" that began on 30 December.
- 6 January – The UK bank accounts of Daniel Andreas San Diego, one of the United States' most wanted fugitives who was arrested in Wales after 21 years on the run, are frozen for 12 months following a hearing at Llandudno Magistrates' Court.
- 7 January
  - Health Secretary Jeremy Miles tells the Senedd that the Welsh Ambulance Service was overwhelmed during Christmas and New Year due to the number of flu and respiratory cases.
  - Police are called to Newport High School after three teachers are attacked by what is reported to have been an ex-student.
- 8 January – Proposals are published to give Members of the Senedd a 6% pay rise, taking the wages for a backbench MS to £76,380 in 2025–26, up from £72,057.
- 9 January – James Howells loses his attempt to sue Newport Council to make them recover a Bitcoin hard drive estimated to be worth about £598m from a rubbish tip.
- 10 January
  - The actor Michael Sheen announces he is to fund a new theatre company, the Welsh National Theatre, to replace the National Theatre Wales, which folded in 2024.
  - Le Pub, a music venue in Newport which was threatened with closure, has been bought by a community enterprise, Music Venue Properties (MVP), which aims to protect live music locations.
- 11 January – The death is reported of Leon Adams, who spent two years in a coma and was left paralysed and brain damaged following an attack in Cardiff on 14 February 2002.
- 14 January – Welsh Conservative leader Darren Millar accuses Senedd Presiding Officer Elin Jones of "inappropriately interrupting him" after she tells him to "tone down" a question about grooming gangs while he called for a fresh inquiry into child sexual abuse.
- 15 January – A burst water pipe at Dolgarrog, Conwy county causes disruption, leading to the closure of schools and businesses. Around 40,000 properties are reported to be affected by the incident, with many remaining without water for several days despite supplies being restored.
- 16 January – Holyhead Port partially reopens following damage caused by Storm Darragh in December 2024.
- 19 January – Seven outdoor educational activity centres for schools run by the Inspiring learning Group are to close with immediate effect after the company went into administration.
- 21 January – First Minister Eluned Morgan tells the Senedd she is lobbying the UK government to give the Welsh Government powers over the Crown Estate in Wales, after a UK government minister suggested otherwise.
- 22 January – Following a trial at Cardiff Crown Court, Courtney Matthew is found guilty of throwing a cup of excrement at a prison officer while he was a prisoner at HM Prison Parc in Bridgend.
- 24 January
  - Dylan Thomas, the grandson of Peter's Pies founder Stanley Thomas, is sentenced to life imprisonment for the murder of his friend William Bush, who he stabbed to death on 24 December 2023.
  - First Minister Eluned Morgan warns Wales' health bosses they will not get extra funds for their services unless they cut waiting times.
- 25 January – A group of seven students are rescued by lifeboat from Worm's Head on the Gower Peninsula after becoming trapped on the tidal island in stormy conditions.
- 28 January – Cardiff University announces plans to cut 400 full time posts because of a funding shortfall.
- 29 January – Andrew RT Davies, former leader of the Welsh Conservatives, is warned by Senedd authorities he will face punishment for any future rule breaking after failing to declare his interest as a farmer when asking questions about inheritance tax for farms.
- 31 January
  - Two police officers are injured during an incident outside a police station in Talbot Green, Rhondda Cynon Taf.
  - First Minister Eluned Morgan confirms she will contest the new seat of Ceredigion and Pembrokeshire at the 2026 Senedd election.

=== February ===
- 3 February – A 14-year-old girl who stabbed two teachers and a student at Amman Valley School in Carmarthenshire is found guilty of attempted murder.
- 4 February – Welsh Conservatives leader Darren Millar and his colleague Russell George miss a Senedd vote on the Eluned Morgan government's budget for 2025–26 because they have travelled to the United States for the annual National Prayer Breakfast.
- 5 February – The Welsh Conservatives are absent from a Senedd debate concerning their former leader, Andrew RT Davies, but reject allegations they are boycotting the chamber's disciplinary process.
- 12 February – St Athan Primary School, in the Vale of Glamorgan, is evacuated following a fire, and will be closed for the rest of the week.
- 14 February – Network Rail is fined £3.75m after two workers were struck and killed in Port Talbot by a train travelling from Swansea to London in July 2019 following safety failures.
- 16 February
  - St Mary's Church, Swansea, is dedicated as Swansea Minster, the first in Wales.
  - Whitehead-Ross, a company that was providing retraining for those affected by the redundancies at Tata Steel's Port Talbot site, closes its offices in the town.
- 17 February – After residents indicated 140 roads where they believed the 30 mph speed limit should be restored, Monmouthshire Council has concluded a review and decided that no roads with a 20 mph speed limit will be reverted.
- 18 February
  - Deputy First Minister Huw Irranca-Davies announces that greyhound racing will be banned in Wales "as soon as practically possible".
  - Neath Port Talbot County Borough Council grants planning permission for Tata Steel to build a £1.25bn electric arc furnace at its Port Talbot steelworks.
- 19 February – Edmund Burke, Vice Chancellor of Bangor University, confirms that the university is to cut around 200 jobs in order to make £15m of savings.
- 20 February
  - Welsh Labour and the Welsh Liberal Democrats agree a deal that will see the Liberal Democrats support Labour's 2025–26 budget. This will include a £1 bus fare cap on journeys for those between the ages of 18 and 21, as well as the previously mentioned ban on greyhound racing, and more money for the NHS in Wales and universal childcare. There is also an extra £4.4m for arts and culture.
  - The latest data from NHS Wales shoes there are 800,395 waiting for NHS treatment, a fall of 2,268 since the previous figures were published in January.
  - Nathan Gill, the former leader of Reform UK in Wales, is charged with offences relating to bribery and is scheduled to appear in court on Monday 24 February.
- 21 February – Social Justice Secretary Jane Hutt, who is the UK's longest serving minister after service in successive Welsh Governments since 1999, announces she will retire from the Senedd in 2026.
- 23 February – The Met Office issues an amber weather warning for heavy rain and floods for mid and south west Wales; there are also high guts of wind further inland.
- 24 February – The UK government rejects a call from Plaid Cymru to devolve responsibility for the Crown Estate in Wales to the Welsh Government, saying it would make no sense to do so.
- 28 February – Former train manager Nicholas McMurray is sentenced to seven years in prison after he is convicted of sexually assaulting an 18-year-old woman while checking her train ticket in June 2024.

=== March ===
- 2 March – Train fares on Transport for Wales services are scheduled to increase, with off peak and day return tickets increasing by 6%, while single tickets increase by 3% and seven-day season tickets by 3.5%.
- 3 March – Richard Jones is sentenced to life imprisonment with a minimum term of 20 years for the July 2024 murder of Sophie Evans, his son's partner, who he wrongly believed had scammed him.
- 4 March
  - The Senedd votes 29–28 to approve the Welsh Government's £26bn budget for 2025–26 after Labour secured the support of Liberal Democrat Jane Dodds to achieve a majority.
  - Oakwood Theme Park, the largest theme park in Wales, announces its closure with immediate effect following a decline in the number of visitors.
- 7 March
  - Around 80 people are to be made redundant from the Royal Mint in Llantrisant.
  - Cardiff Council confirms that the speed limit on four busy roads in the city will be reverted from 20 mph back to 30 mph.
- 9 March
  - Police began a murder investigation after a 40-year-old woman, subsequently named as Joanne Penney, is shot dead at a block of flats in Talbot Green. A man is arrested in connection with the incident.
  - Following an unseasonably warm spell of weather, the highest temperature of the year so far is recorded at Hawarden in north Wales, with a high of 18.7 °C.
- 11 March
  - Police investigating the shooting of Joanne Penney make a further four arrests; they are also investigating the possibility she was killed following a case of mistaken identity.
  - The Democracy and Boundary Commission has decided that all Senedd seats will have Welsh language only names from 2026.
- 12 March
  - Data from Public Health Wales indicates an increase in alcohol-related deaths, with 562 deaths in 2023, a 15.6% increase on the previous year.
  - Anthony Pierce, the former Anglican Bishop of Swansea and Brecon, is sentenced to four years and one month in prison after pleading guilty to the sexual abuse of a boy over a period of five years.
  - Transport for Wales publishes new images of a proposed £140m upgrade to Cardiff Central railway station.
- 14 March
  - A hearing at the Old Bailey sets a trial date of 29 June 2026 for Nathan Gill, who is accused of accepting bribes to make statements in the European Parliament that would have been beneficial to Russia.
  - At Swansea Crown Court, three men are sentenced to eight years and one month in prison after pleading guilty to the attempted kidnapping of Israeli record producer Itay Kashti, who was lured to an isolated farm by the three, who posed as representatives of Polydor Records.
- 15 March – South Wales Police confirm that five people have been charged in connection with the death of Joanne Penney; four have been charged with murder and a fifth with assisting an offender.
- 17 March – South Wales Police launch a murder investigation following the disappearance of Charlene Hobbs, a 36-year-old woman from Cardiff, who was last seen in the city in July 2024.
- 18 March – Six people are remanded in custody in connection with the death of Joanne Penney. A plea hearing is set for 7 July, while a trial could take place at the end of October.
- 21 March –
  - Firefighters are dealing with a number of wildfires following a recent spell of unseasonably warm weather.
  - Wales's first post box to bear King Charles III's Royal cypher is installed next to a delivery office in Severn Street, Welshpool, Powys.
  - Cardiff and Vale University Health Board imposes a temporary ban on visitors to its hospitals following an outbreak of norovirus.
  - BBC Radio Wales DJ Aleighcia Scott reaches number one in the iTunes Reggae Chart with her first Welsh-language single, "Dod o'r Galon".
  - A motorcyclist and pillion passenger are killed in a late night crash in Wrexham.
- 25 March – An inquest into the death of Joanne Penney hears that she died following a gunshot wound to the chest.
- 28 March – First Minister Eluned Morgan refuses to give her backing to welfare cuts outlined by Chancellor Rachel Reeves in the 2025 spring statement until she has more information about their potential impact, and conforms she has written to Liz Kendall, the Secretary of State for Work and Pensions, to request an impact assessment for Wales.
- 29 March – Launch of the Black Welsh Music Awards, designed to recognise talented black musicians in Wales.
- 31 March –
  - The Welsh Government says it will not publish Liz Kendall's response to Eluned Morgan regarding the impact of welfare cuts in Wales.
  - The Welsh Government publishes legislation to bring control of bus services in Wales back under public control, creating a London-style franchised bus service controlled by Transport for Wales.

=== April ===
- 1 April –
  - The Welsh Government confirms that children staying in hostels, campsites and outdoor centres will be exempt from paying the proposed tourism tax.
  - Three men are killed in a crash between a car and a lorry on the A48 near Bonvilston, Vale of Glamorgan.
- 4 April – Mr Burton, a biopic about the relationship between actor Richard Burton and his teacher Philip Burton, is released in cinemas. The cast includes Welsh actors Aimee-Ffion Edwards, Steffan Rhodri and Aneurin Barnard, and the film is directed by Marc Evans.
- 6 April – Elin Jones confirms she will stand down as Llywydd of the Senedd following the next election.
- 9 April –
  - The Welsh Government confirms that the Senedd will vote on whether the Terminally Ill Adults (End of Life) Bill should apply to Wales if it successfully passes through the Westminster parliament.
  - Data published by GoSafe indicates that 112,699 drivers have been caught breaking the 20 mph speed limit since its introduction in September 2023.
  - Following a trial at Cardiff Crown Court, Corey Gauci is found guilty of the murder of Colin Richards, a father-of-seven who was stabbed in the city's Ely district in April 2024.
- 10 April – Plans to close Cardiff University's nursing department are put on hold while an "alternative plan" is considered.
- 11 April – Members of the University and College Union at Cardiff University vote for strike action and a marking and assessment boycott during the summer term in response to planned job cuts by the university.
- 15 April
  - Following a trial at Newport Crown Court, Jacob Ewing, a 44-year-old man from North Carolina, who travelled to Wales to "marry" a 15-year-old girl he groomed online for more than a year, is sentenced to seven years and eight months in prison.
  - Welsh Conservative Senedd member Russell George is removed from two Senedd committees after he is charged over the 2024 United Kingdom general election betting scandal.
- 16 April –
  - An electricity interconnector is launched between Pembrokeshire and Great Island in Wexford Harbour, Ireland. The 190 km cable will allow electricity to be exported from Britain and surplus Irish electricity to be imported from Ireland.
  - Former broadcast journalist and Labour politician Delyth Evans is appointed chair of S4C.
- 18 April – God Shaped Hole, the debut album of Welsh rock band Those Damn Crows, reaches number one in the UK Albums Chart.
- 22 April – Russell George withdraws as a Conservative candidate for the 2026 Senedd election after being charged over the general election betting scandal.
- 23 April – Nerys Bethan Lloyd, the former owner of a paddleboarding company, is sentenced to ten and a half years in prison after pleading guilty to gross negligence manslaughter over the deaths of four people on the Western Cleddau River in Haverfordwest, Pembrokeshire in October 2021.
- 24 April – The Senedd Commissioner for Standards finds that Senedd member Siân Gwenllian breached the Senedd's code of conduct after sharing a confidential letter, but recommends no further action is taken against her.
- 25 April –
  - At a hearing at Swansea Crown Court, head teacher Anthony Felton is sentenced to two years and four months in prison after attacking his deputy with a wrench because of an "overwhelming sexual jealousy" over a love triangle at his school. Felton had admitted attempted grievous bodily harm at an earlier hearing over the incident in March.
  - Paranoid schizophrenic Karolina Zurawska, who killed her six-year-old son while believing she was being "instructed by a demonic force", is given an indefinite hospital order.
- 26 April – A march calling for Welsh independence is held in Barry, with between 6,000 and 7,000 people in attendance.
- 28 April – A 14-year-old girl who stabbed two teachers and a pupil at Ysgol Dyffryn Aman in Carmarthenshire in April 2024, is sentenced to fifteen years in detention, with a recommendation she serve at least half the sentence, after being found guilty of attempted murder.
- 30 April –
  - An investigation is launched after 25 people attending a lamb and calf petting session at a farm shop in Cowbridge, Vale of Glamorgan, contracted cryptosporidium.
  - 2024 Talerddig train collision: An investigation into the crash determines that four faults were detected in a safety system for one of the trains involved.

=== May ===
- 1 May –
  - A planned strike by staff at Cardiff University is called off after the university said there will be no compulsory redundancies during 2025.
  - The record is broken for Wales's warmest start to May, with 27 °C recorded at Cardiff's Bute Park.
- 2 May – The number of people who have fallen ill following a petting session at a farm in Cowbridge, Vale of Glamorgan, rises to 47.
- 3 May – Hywel Dda University Health Board introduces a new technology that provides pregnant type 1 diabetic women with an artificial pancreas to help regulate their insulin levels.
- 8 May –
  - First Minister Eluned Morgan sends Wales's congratulations to the newly elected Pope Leo XIV.
  - The number of people who have fallen ill following an animal petting session at a farm in the Vale of Glamorgan rises to 74.
- 13 May – Reform UK leader Nigel Farage says he will not stand in the 2026 Senedd election and has no plans to lead the party in Wales.
- 14 May – The number of people to fall ill following an animal petting session at a farm in Cowbridge reaches 81.
- 15 May – Pride Cymru announces it will ban the involvement of political parties in its largest pride event, Cardiff Pride (which takes place in June) unless they show commitment to transgender rights.
- 16 May – Welsh Conservatives leader Darren Millar tells his party's annual conference that the Conservatives may need to work with Plaid Cymru or Reform UK to form a government following the next Senedd election.
- 21 May – Data released by Statistics Wales suggests crashes on roads with 20 mph and 30 mph speed limits are at their lowest since records began.
- 22 May –
  - The Hay Festival takes place in Hay-on-Wye from 22 May till 1 June.
  - Welsh Labour expels Cardiff councillor Keith Jones after an investigation found he had sexually harassed a teenager.
  - Wrexham, Shropshire and Midlands Railway submits an application to the Office of Rail and Road to operate an open access train service linking Wrexham with London Euston.
- 23 May –
  - Corey Gauci is sentenced to life imprisonment with a minimum term of 24 years for the April 2024 murder of Colin Richards, who was stabbed in the Ely area of Cardiff.
  - A report by Estyn, the education and training inspectorate for Wales, suggests secondary school attendance levels in Wales may not return to pre-pandemic levels for another decade.
  - Police begin an investigation following the death of a 16-year-old boy after a "medical episode" at Barry Island Pleasure Park.
- 26 May – BBC News reports that Gwynedd Council have made an application for the Grade II listed Corbett Arms Hotel in Tywyn, where John Lennon and Yoko Ono spent a holiday as newlyweds in 1969, to be demolished after the building has remained derelict for a decade and parts of it have collapsed.
- 26–31 May – The 2025 Urdd National Eisteddfod takes place at Margam Country Park near Port Talbot.
- 27 May – Cardiff University backtracks on plans to close its music and modern languages departments.
- 29 May –
  - Reform UK win their first local council seat in Wales, when Michelle May Beer wins at a by-election in the Lliedi ward in Llanelli.
  - Wales has experienced its sunniest spring on record, provisional Met Office indicate, with 648 hours of sunshine between 1 March and 28 May, a figure higher than the UK average of 636.8.
  - Bangor Cathedral has its spending suspended by its local diocese after the discovery of debts worth several thousand pounds.
- 30 May –
  - An upgrade to the A465 road which began in 2002 is finally completed after 23 years, and at a cost of £2bn.
  - Bangor University is to reconsider cuts to its special collection and archive departments after concerns were raised.

=== June ===
- 3 June
  - Denbigh High School is evacuated after "potentially harmful chemicals" were found in a science department store cupboard.
  - Lucy Langmead, a former police administrator with South Wales Police, is sentenced to two years and 11 months in prison for passing confidential information to her drug dealer boyfriend.
- 5 June – Former workers at a poultry factory in Anglesey are given the go-ahead to proceed with legal action against the factory's parent company over an outbreak of COVID-19 in June 2020.
- 6 June – Alexander Walker, the youngest member of Rhyl Town Council, is elected as the town's mayor at the age of 25.
- 9 June
  - The Royal Welsh Show announces a ban on English livestock from the 2025 event because of the spread of bluetongue disease.
  - Engineering work begins on overhead power cables in the Severn Tunnel linking England and Wales by rail, reducing train services until 20 June.
- 10 June – Teachers in Wales are offered a 4% pay rise, but unions express their dismay that the offer is below the 4.8% recommended by the Independent Welsh Pay Review Body.
- 11 June – 2025 Spending Review: Funding for five new railway stations in Cardiff, Newport and Monmouthshire are announced as part of the Spending Review, as well as upgrades to the existing rail network in Wales.
- 12 June – North Wales Police confirm that two women have been killed during an incident in Snowdonia National Park the previous evening during which both were pulled from the pools on the Watkin Path.
- 13 June – Alexander Dighton, who attempted to murder a police officer with a Molotov cocktail during an incident outside Talbot Green police station in January 2025, is sentenced to life imprisonment with a minimum of 22 years by the Old Bailey.
- 18 June – An inquest is opened and adjourned into the deaths of two sisters who drowned at Snowdonia National Park on 11 June.
- 19 June
  - Wales becomes the first part of the UK to ban wet wipes containing plastic after the Senedd votes to make their sale illegal from December 2026.
  - Firefighters tackle a fire in the Conwy Tunnel on the A55 after a vehicle catches fire.
- 22 June – Former Pembrokeshire councillor Andrew Edwards is disqualified from holding public office for four years over a racist voice note he posted on WhatsApp.
- 24 June – A report by Arts Council Wales warns that Welsh folk music could be extinct within a generation unless the situation is urgently addressed.
- 26 June – Protection zones are put in place following the discovery of bird flu at poultry farms in Haverfordwest and Wrexham.
- 27 June – Andrew John announces his retirement from the post of Archbishop of Wales with immediate effect.
- 28 June – The Welsh Government announces that smokers and ex-smokers aged between 55 and 74 will be offered screening for lung cancer.

=== July ===
- 1 July
  - Restrictions are placed on bringing livestock from England to Wales due to the spread of the bluetongue virus.
  - Dyfed-Powys Police recover the body of Labour Party peer Lord David Lipsey from the River Wye at Glasbury, Powys, after receiving a concerned call about a man swimming in the river the previous day.
- 2 July – A report by the Senedd Standards Commission finds that First Minister Eluned Morgan failed to declare a donation from the Unite union.
- 3 July – Student Evan Powell, who in October 2024, broke into the homes of three Swansea women while they slept and watched them sleeping, is sentenced to five years in prison by Swansea Crown Court, together with a further four years on extended licence.
- 5 July – A new water park is scheduled to open at Cosmeston Country Park in the Vale of Glamorgan.
- 6 July – BBC News reports that Reform UK would be highly unlikely to introduce an insurance based healthcare system in Wales should it win the 2026 Senedd election, largely because of the timescale and potential legal implications of doing so.
- 8 July – Members of the Senedd vote to approve a tourism tax for accommodation in Wales that would see a daily fee of £1.30 added to the cost of staying overnight in Wales.
- 9 July – Secretary of State for Wales Jo Stevens says public services in Wales will not face cuts despite a shortfall in covering a rise in employers' National Insurance contributions. Her comments follow a warning from Welsh Government Finance Secretary Mark Drakeford, who warned Wales was facing a £36m financial black hole.
- 12 July – 2025 United Kingdom heatwaves: Train services between Pontypridd, Merthyr Tydfil and Aberdare are cancelled after rail tracks buckle in the heat, affecting concertgoers travelling to a Stereophonics concert in Cardiff.
- 13 July – Train services continue to be disrupted after heat damage to tracks the previous day.
- 14 July – Former Conservative MP Katie Wallis (formerly Jamie Wallis) is given a fine and a community order for her ex-wife.
- 15 July –
  - Following a trial at Mold Crown Court, Michael and Kerry Ives are found guilty of the murder of their two-year-old grandson, Ethan Ives-Griffiths, after he suffered "catastrophic" head injuries at their home in Garden City, Flintshire, in August 2021. Ethan's mother, Shannon Ives, is found guilty of causing or allowing the death of a child and cruelty to a child.
  - ASDA is fined £640,000 for selling a number of out-of-date items, some as much as two weeks past their sell by date, at two of their stores in Cardiff.
- 16 July – A further two people are charged in connection with the death of Joanne Penney in March.
- 18 July
  - Terminal 3 of Holyhead Port, one of two terminals at the site damaged by Storm Darragh in December 2024, is scheduled to reopen following a number of delays.
  - Sir Wayne David announces he is standing down as chief special adviser to Eluned Morgan for health reasons.
- 19 July
  - An eleventh person is charged in connection with the death of Joanne Penney.
  - Former rugby union player Alun Wyn Jones is made an honorary colonel of the 3rd Battalion, Royal Welsh by King Charles III.
  - Caerphilly Castle reopens after two years of renovations costing £8m.
- 21 July – Following the publication of a review by the Independent Water Commission, the UK government announces the water regulator Ofwat is to be scrapped, with new separate bodies created for England and Wales to replace it. The Welsh Government must decide whether responsibility should fall to Natural Resources Wales, which regulates Welsh Water over pollution, or if a newly created body.
- 22 July – Welsh Conservative member of the Senedd Laura Anne Jones joins Reform UK.
- 25 July – Jacqueline Totterdell is appointed as the next chief executive of NHS Wales, and is expected to succeed Judith Paget at the end of September.
- 30 July – The Most Reverend Cherry Vann is named as the new Archbishop of Wales, becoming the first woman elected as an Anglican archbishop in the UK and the first openly gay and partnered bishop to serve as a primate in the Anglican Communion.
- 31 July – Tata Steel is fined £1.5m over the death of contractor Justin Day, who was crushed to death while working at the Port Talbot plant in September 2019.

=== August ===
- 1 August – The Baptist Union of Wales confirms that a campaign group set up to save Capel Rhondda in Hopkinstown, Rhondda Cynon Taf, where the hymn "Cwm Rhondda" was first performed in December 1907, will be allowed to buy the building.
- 2 August – Police have arrested seven people in Newport following a violent disturbance in the town the previous day. They are subsequently charged with violent disorder.
- 4 August – Owain Rhys wins the Crown at the National Eisteddfod in Wrexham.
- 5 August – Plans are unveiled for a 50-storey building in Cardiff, which if approved, would become Wales's tallest, and the UK's second tallest.
- 8 August
  - Michael O'Brien, one of three men wrongly convicted of the 1987 killing of Cardiff newsagent Phillip Saunders, loses a legal case in which he sought to reclaim money charged for his bed and board during the eleven years he spent in prison.
  - New members of the Gorsedd inducted at the National Eisteddfod in Wrexham include Mark Lewis Jones, Rhun ap Iorwerth and Maxine Hughes.
- 12 August
  - Police launch an investigation after a group of children were filmed at a scouting camp in Caerphilly after being mistaken for asylum seekers, then subjected to online abuse when the footage was posted on social media.
  - A double heatwave is forecast for parts of Wales, with temperatures reaching 33 °C on Tuesday 12 August, then rising again towards the weekend after a cooler period.
  - A planned three week strike by Unite members at Cardiff Bus starting on 17 August is called off after staff received a better pay offer.
- 13 August – Thirteen children and one adult receive minor injuries after an accident involving a ride at Coney Beach Pleasure Park in Porthcawl.
- 14 August – Natural Resources Wales declares a drought in parts of Wales following the driest six-month period since 1976.
- 14 August – At a by-election in Grangetown the Green Party wins their first ever seat on Cardiff Council and their first ever by-election win in Wales.
- 16 August – A 36-year-old man dies after falling from Mount Snowdon.
- 19 August – Beachgoers are warned not to venture into the sea at Llandudno's West Shore after harmful levels of bacteria were found in the water.
- 20 August – Former Conservative MP Sarah Atherton leaves the party, describing it as "impotent" and something that "no longer aligns" with her "values or ideology", and announces plans to stand in the 2026 Senedd election.
- 26 August – An inquest opens into the death of Welsh Labour Senedd member Hefin David.
- 27 August – A multi-agency report into a girl who stabbed a pupil and two teachers at Amman Valley School in Carmarthen, finds that she would have benefited from "targeted help" if "information had been fully shared and assessed".
- 29 August – A drought is declared in North Wales following the driest six months since 1976.
- 30 August – Figures published by Wales's fire services indicates the number of wildfires during 2025 has surpassed the number of wildfires in 2020.
- August – Two pots containing between 10,000 and 15,000 Roman coins were found by metal detectorists in Wales, probably the largest such find in the country ever.

=== September ===
- 1 September
  - Provisional Met Office data suggests 2025 saw Wales's warmest summer on record.
  - A pilot scheme sees those aged 16 to 21 able to access £1 bus fares in Wales, with a day ticket costing £3.
- 3 September – Figures show that 7,176 children were home schooled in Wales during 2024–25, the highest number on record. The number is almost three times that of 2,517 in 2018–19.
- 4 September – Vale of Glamorgan Council is to become the first local authority in Wales to ban the advertising of junk food in certain areas, as well as on its website. The new rules will take effect from March 2026.
- 10 September
  - South Wales Police confirm that the remains of Jordan Moray, who was reported missing from Cwmbach, near Aberdare in Rhondda Cynon Taf, in July 2019, were found in the Brecon Beacons on 29 August.
  - An investigation by the Senedd's Standards Commissioner concludes that Reform UK's Laura Anne Jones broke the rules by using a racial slur to describe Chinese people, but clears her of making fraudulent expenses claims.
  - S4C announces a new five-year strategy that includes putting more emphasis on "digital first" content to attract younger viewers.
- 11 September
  - Sean Morgan, the leader of Caerphilly County Borough Council, resigns from Welsh Labour and joins Plaid Cymru, meaning he also relinquishes his post as council leader.
  - Reform UK win their first seat on Vale of Glamorgan Council at a by-election in Illtyd in Barry.
- 13 September
  - A steel statue of athlete Steve Jones is unveiled in his home town of Ebbw Vale.
  - Around 400 people attend a "stop the boats" protest in Newtown, Powys, with a counter-demonstration involving 200 people taking place nearby.
- 17 September
  - Eluned Morgan, First Minister of Wales, declines an invitation to a state banquet being given at Windsor Castle for Donald Trump, in order to attend a private function with the family of Hefin David.
  - Scientists discover limnephilus pati, a species of caddisfly thought to have been extinct in the UK since 2016, during a survey at Goch Nature Reserve on Anglesey.
  - University and College Union members at Bangor University pass a motion of no confidence in the university's vice chancellor and chief finance officer over cuts to staff and budgets.
- 18 September
  - Llinos Griffin-Williams, who was dismissed as the boss of S4C in 2023 for allegedly being drunk and verbally abusive, launches a legal case against the channel for compensation worth several hundred thousand pounds.
  - Five staff members are dismissed from HMP Parc over messages showing them laughing at violent encounters with inmates.
  - Reform UK win their first seat on Cardiff Council at a by-election in Trowbridge.
- 19 September
  - Prison worker Megan Breen is given a ten-month suspended sentence after having an affair with a prisoner at HMP Prescoed.
  - Health Minister Jeremy Miles announces he will not stand in the 2026 Senedd election.
- 20 September – Cardiff Council approves plans to ban the advertising of junk food from its properties.
- 26 September – Former AS and leader of Reform UK Wales, Nathan Gill, pleads guilty to multiple charges of bribery.
- 27 September – Tickets for the 2026 Green Man Festival, scheduled for August, go on sale, and sell out within two hours.

=== October ===
- 2 October – The Welsh Government announces that European beavers are to become a protected species in Wales, bringing it in line with England and Scotland.
- 3 October
  - At a hearing at Mold Crown Court, Michael and Kerry Ives are sentenced to life imprisonment with minimum terms of 23 and 17 years respectively for the murder of their two-year-old grandson, Ethan Ives-Griffiths, in August 2021.
  - The Old Wye Bridge between Chepstow and Tutshill, one of the oldest crossings between Wales and England, is closed to traffic after engineers find structural damage.
- 4 October
  - Storm Amy: High winds of up to 85mph cause widespread disruption to travel, and leave several hundred properties without power.
  - The Menai Suspension Bridge is temporarily closed in order to replace bolts on beams beneath the bridge.
  - Closure of the Coney Beach Amusement Park in Porthcawl after 107 years.
- 5 October – It is reported that under a longstanding agreement, the Ministry of Defence spends around £1m a year sending the children of military personnel to private schools in north Wales because "state schools teach some or all lessons in the Welsh language".
- 7 October – The Welsh Government announces that the Menai Suspension Bridge will partially reopen in the coming days.
- 8 October – Stereophonics are forced to cancel a number of forthcoming tour dates after singer Kelly Jones suffered a "displaced jaw joint".
- 10 October – S4C reaches an out-of-court settlement with its former boss, Sian Doyle.
- 11 October – Detectives at South Wales Police begin a forensic review of the 1995 Gurnos house fire at Merthyr Tydfil in which three people were killed.
- 13 October – Public Health Wales are investigating a number of suspected food poisoning cases linked to a hotel in Cwmbran after 52 people who dined there reported being unwell.
- 16 October – Cardiff Council approves plans to change parking permits in order to charge more for large vehicles such as SUVs.
- 17 October – At a hearing at Cardiff Crown Court, teenager Cory Jones is sentenced to eight years in prison after pleading guilty to sexually abusing 37 girls online.
- 21 October
  - Following a trial at Swansea Crown Court, Ethel Mills and her lover, Geraint Berry, are found guilty of conspiring to murder her husband, Christopher Mills, in September 2024. They will be sentenced on 19 December.
  - The Welsh Government sets out its preference for a separate water regulator for Wales to replace Ofwat.
- 23 October
  - 2025 Caerphilly by-election for the Senedd: Lindsay Whittle takes the seat for Plaid Cymru, forcing Labour into third place behind Reform UK.
  - Marcus Huntley, on trial at Cardiff Crown Court with five other people for the murder of Joanne Penney, who was fatally shot at her flat in Talbot Green in March, changes his plea to guilty.
- 24 October – A juror who collapsed a murder trial in December 2023 after doing his own research on the internet is sentenced to four months in prison.
- 28 October – Torfaen County Borough Council confirms that 19 people have fallen ill after eating a carvery at a pub in Cwmbran on 5 October.
- 30 October – Plaid Cymru leader Rhun ap Iorwerth and SNP leader John Swinney hold talks to develop a "progressive alliance" between the two parties.
- 31 October – Aberystwyth, though technically not a city, is selected as Wales's first Unesco City of Literature.

=== November ===
- 2 November – Gwent Police report that a nine-month-old baby has been killed by a dog attack in Monmouthshire. The dog responsible is later confirmed to have been an American XL bully.
- 4 November
  - The Welsh Government publishes plans for providers of self-catering accommodation in Wales to obtain a licence showing they have met certain safety standards.
  - Heavy rain brings flooding to parts of Carmarthenshire, Pembrokeshire and Swansea.
- 5–6 November – A major incident is declared in parts of south west Wales as a result of floods caused by heavy rain. A severe flood warning ("threat to life") continues in place for a caravan park in Tenby and parts of Carmarthen.
- 7 November – The Independent Office for Police Conduct announces that six officers from Gwent Police will face a misconduct process over their actions after it took them two days to find a car that had crashed and killed three people in March 2023.
- 8 November –
  - Votes for the 2026 Senedd election will be counted the day after election day rather than overnight after the polls close.
  - Robert James and Sean Morgan, two former Labour council leaders, of Carmarthen and Caerphilly respectively, defect to the Green Party.
- 10 November – The Unite union announces that bus drivers at First Cymru will stage a two-month strike from 20 November in a row over pay.
- 11 November – A yellow weather alert is in place for heavy rain in Wales.
- 12 November – The Senedd Standards Commission recommends Laura Anne Jones, the Senedd's only Reform UK member, face a two-week suspension from the chamber for her use of a racial slur against Chinese people in a WhatsApp group in August 2023, while she was a member of the Welsh Conservatives.
- 14 November – A man is charged following an investigation into a fake admiral at a wreath-laying ceremony in Llandudno on 9 December.
- 15 November
  - A major incident is declared in Monmouth following severe and widespread flooding caused by Storm Claudia.
  - An 18-year-old man is charged with the murder of 17-year-old Lainie Williams and the attempted murder of another woman at a property in Cefn Fforest in Caerphilly on 13 November.
- 18 November – At a hearing at Mold Crown Court, Miles Cross pleads guilty to four counts of intentionally committing an act capable of encouraging or assisting suicide after selling chemicals online that could be used as a suicide aide.
- 19 November – Laura Anne Jones is suspended from the Senedd chamber for 14 days for breaking the parliamentary code over her use of a racial slur in a WhatsApp message.
- 20 November –
  - At a hearing at the Old Bailey, Nathan Gill, the former leader of Reform UK in Wales, pleads guilty to eight counts of bribery relating to a pro-Russian influence campaign in the European Parliament during 2018 and 2019.
  - COVID-19 in Wales: Publication of the second report by the UK COVID-19 Inquiry, which describes the Welsh Government's initial response to the pandemic as "inadequate", and says ministers were "overly reliant" on the UK government to take the lead.
  - Snow and ice causes disruption across Wales, with several hundred homes without power and a number of schools closed for the day.
- 21 November –
  - At the Old Bailey, Nathan Gill, former UKIP and later Reform UK leader in Wales, is sentenced to 10 and a half years in prison for accepting Russian bribes while in the European Parliament during 2018 and 2019.
  - Around 60 schools are closed as snow and ice continues to cause disruption, and after overnight temperatures fell to as low as −6°C.
- 24 November – A study published by Natural Resources Wales reveals a list of endangered species in Wales. It includes the high brown fritillary butterfly and Snowdon leaf beetle.
- 27 November – A hearing in Cardiff rules that plans introduced by Cyngor Gwynedd in September 2024 that required a planning application for properties to be turned into second homes or holiday lets is unlawful.
- 28 November – Former Swansea headteacher James Richards, who exposed himself to other staff members while on a school trip, is banned from teaching in Wales for at least 15 years.
- 30 November – Public Health Wales launches an investigation after a number of cases of acute respiratory infections associated with Blaenhonddan Primary School in Bryncoch, Neath.

=== December ===
- 1 December – Heavy rain causes some disruption, with an amber weather alert for south Wales and a yellow alert for north Wales.
- 2 December – Plaid Cymru confirms it is in talks with Welsh Labour over the Welsh Government's budget.
- 5 December
  - Joe Cooper is sacked as Director of Music at Bangor Cathedral following a disciplinary hearing over an inappropriate song performed by a choir on 31 August as part of a protest about cuts.
  - Holyhead Port temporarily closes Terminal 5 following a "berthing incident" involving a ferry during severe weather.
- 9 December – The Welsh Government and Plaid Cymru agree a deal to pass the Welsh budget after an agreement to supply more money to local authorities and healthcare.
- 10 December – It is reported that 43 people have fallen ill from food poisoning after eating a Sunday lunch at a pub in Llangynwyd near Bridgend.
- 12 December – Two people are killed following an explosion in the garden of a house in Caerphilly.
- 15 December – With the Met Office issuing separate weather warnings for north, mid and south Wales,heavy rain and flooding causes widespread disruption, with some "possible risk to life" warnings in place.
- 17 December –
  - An 86-year-old man is arrested in connection with the 1993 shooting of Harry and Megan Tooze at their farmhouse in Llanharry.
  - Teacher Patrick Lawler, who described Islam as "satanic" and told pupils that "cocaine was purer back in the day", is found guilty of professional misconduct by the Teaching Regulation Agency.
- 19 December – At a hearing at Swansea Crown Court, Michelle Mills and her lover Geraint Berry are sentenced to 19 years in prison for conspiracy to murder Mills' husband Christopher, who was attacked in a caravan by two masked men.
- 24 December – The Met Office issues a yellow weather warning for high winds for much of Wales on Christmas Day.
- 25 December – Around 1,800 people participate in the annual Christmas Day swim at Porthcawl to mark the event's 60th anniversary, despite warnings of 85mph winds.
- 29 December – Jonathan Davies receives the CBE in the 2026 New Year Honours list issued today. Other Welsh recipients include Gabby Logan (OBE), campaigner Marcus Fair (MBE) and wildlife photographer Sue Flood (OBE).
- 31 December – A yellow weather warning for ice and snow is issued for parts of Wales on Friday 2 January.

== Arts and culture ==
=== National Eisteddfod of Wales ===
- Crown: Owain Rhys
- Chair: Tudur Hallam
- Drama Medal: Greta Siôn – Presennol
- Prose Medal: Bryn Jones
- Gwobr Goffa Daniel Owen: Peredur Glyn Cwyfan Webb-Davies, Anfarwol

=== Urdd National Eisteddfod ===
- Chair: Elain Roberts
- Crown: Mali Elwy

=== Music ===
- 6 October – Don Leisure wins the 2025 Welsh Music Prize for his album Tyrchu Sain.
- 13 December – Paediatric consultant Dr Sian Jenkins, based at Ysbyty Glangwili, Carmarthen, has written a Christmas song, Pob Un Plentyn (Every Child) for a choir, Cân o'r Galon, made up of young heart patients.

==== Albums ====
- Adwaith – Solas
- Manic Street Preachers – Critical Thinking

=== Film ===
- 19 October – Afghan-Canadian filmmaker Alexander Farah is announced as the winner of Cardiff's Iris Prize LGBTQ+ Film Festival Award for his film, One Day This Kid.

==== English language films ====
- Havoc, written and directed by Gareth Evans, starring Tom Hardy
- Madfabulous, directed by Celyn Jones, starring Callum Scott Howells
- Mr Burton

==== Welsh language films ====
- Hud y Lleisiau Bach (short)

=== Theatre ===
- Playing Burton by Mark Jenkins, performed by Matthew Rhys in aid of the Welsh National Theatre

=== Broadcasting ===
==== English language television ====
- Cleddau/The One That Got Away (English version), starring Richard Harrington. Welsh version shown on S4C in 2024.
- Death Valley, starring Timothy Spall and Gwyneth Keyworth
- Wynne and Joanna: All At Sea

==== Welsh language television ====
- Tŷ Ffit
- Ruth Ellis: Y Cariad a'r Crogi

==== Radio ====
- 21–24 July – BBC Radio, television and online provides coverage of the 2025 Royal Welsh Show, with radio coverage provided by BBC Radio 4 and BBC Radio Wales.
- 6 August – BBC Radio Wales announces that Bronwen Lewis will succeed Wynne Evans as presenter of the morning show, and will begin presenting in the autumn.

== Sport ==
- 6 January – Bangor City F.C. is dissolved by Companies House following a compulsory strike-off.
- 11 February – Warren Gatland resigns as head coach of the Wales national rugby union team following Wales's poor performance in the 2025 Six Nations Championship. Matt Sherratt is appointed as caretaker head coach.
- 4 May – At the age of 50, Mark Williams becomes the oldest player ever to appear in the final of the World Snooker Championship, breaking the record set by Ray Reardon (49) in the 1982 final. He eventually loses to Zhao Xintong of China.
- 21 July – Steve Tandy is named new head coach of the Wales national rugby union team.
- 19 August – The Welsh Rugby Union publishes proposals that would reduce the number of professional teams in Wales from four to two.
- 31 August – Swansea's St Helen's Cricket Ground hosts its final cricket match as the Ospreys prepares to return to the venue after 20 years.
- 6 September – 2025 Women's Rugby World Cup: Wales exit the World Cup in the group stage after they are defeated by Fiji.
- 7 September – The 2025 Tour of Britain ends its final stage in Cardiff. This also marks the official end of Geraint Thomas's 20 year cycling career.
- 15 October –
  - Jess Fishlock announces her retirement from international footballer.
  - Cardiff University Students' Union announces a men's student cricket club has been suspended following allegations of "degrading" behaviour during a social event.
- 12 December – Para-rower Benjamin Pritchard is named 2025 BBC Cymru Wales Sports Personality of the Year.
- 27 December – The 2025 Welsh Grand National takes place at Chepstow Racecourse. The race is won by Haiti Couleurs, trained at Newport, Pembrokeshire by Rebecca Curtis and ridden by Welsh jockey Sean Bowen.

== Holidays ==
see Public holidays in Wales

== Deaths ==
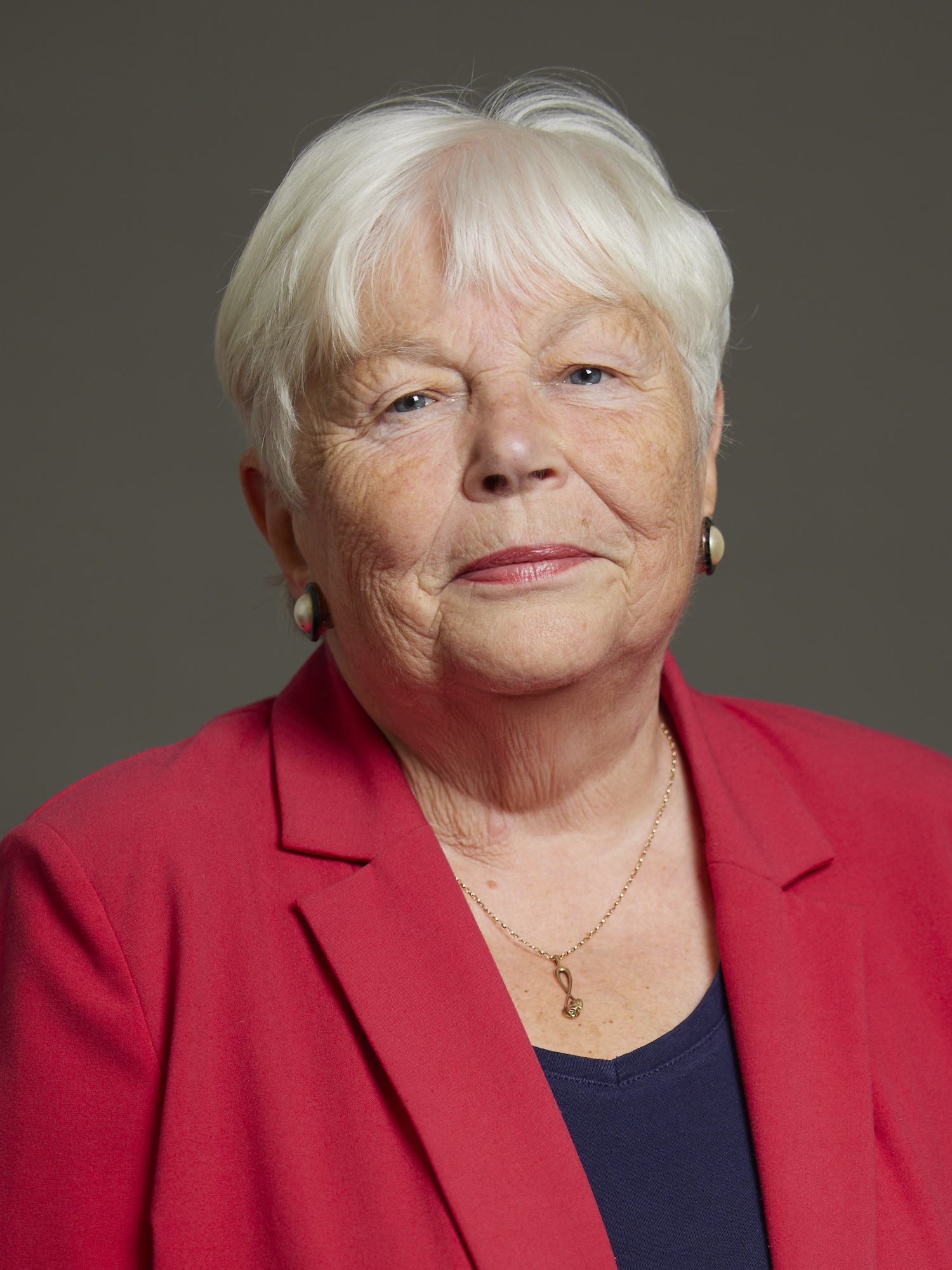
Jenny Randerson

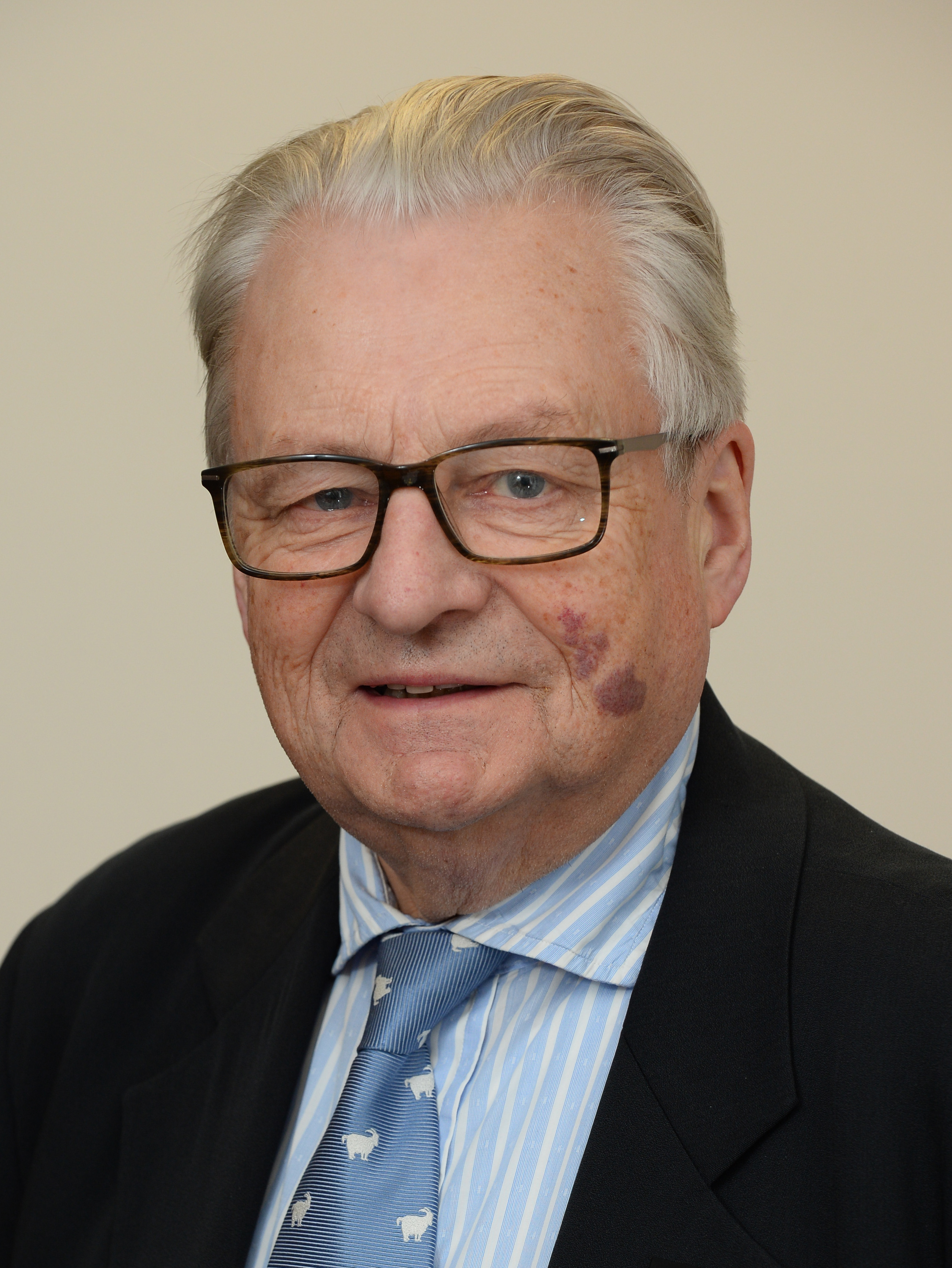
Dafydd Elis-Thomas

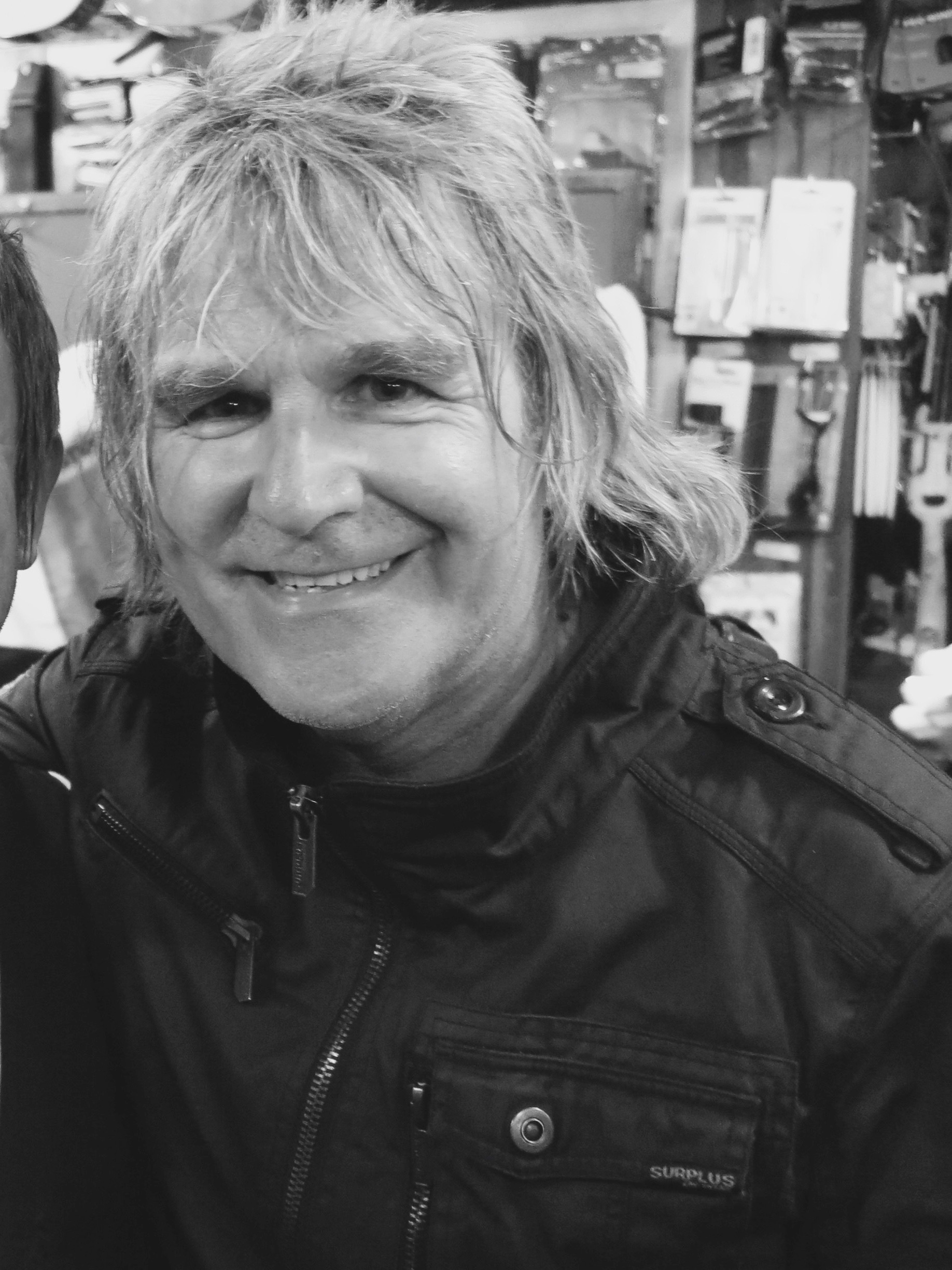
Mike Peters

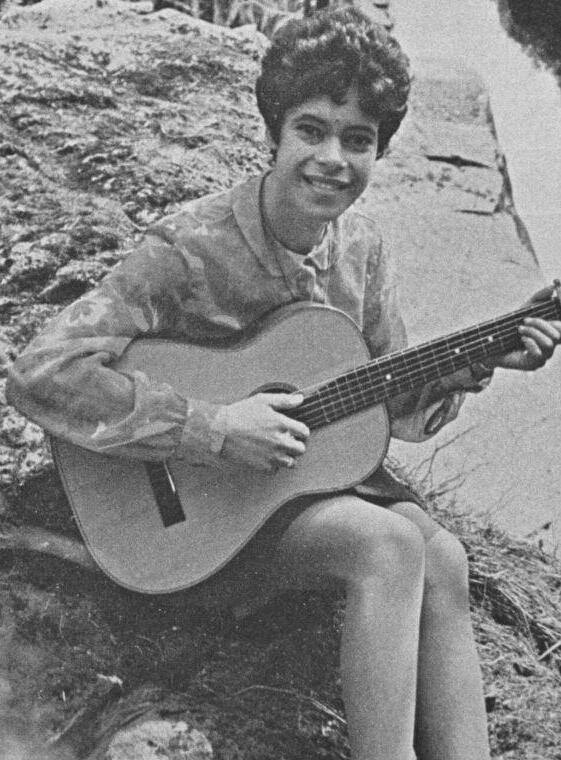
Iris Williams

- 4 January – Jenny Randerson, Baroness Randerson, 76, Welsh politician and peer, acting Deputy First Minister of Wales (2001–2002) and member of the House of Lords (since 2011).
- 6 January – Meirion Roberts, 90, Welsh rugby union player (Cardiff, national team).
- 8 January – Geraint H. Jenkins, 78, historian (death reported on this date)
- 9 January – Emrys Roberts, 93, Plaid Cymru politician
- 10 January – Rhythwyn Evans, 95, farmer and fundraiser (nicknamed the Welsh Captain Tom).
- 6 February – Ernie Walley, 91, Welsh football player (Middlesbrough, Tottenham Hotspur) and manager (Barking). (death announced on this date)
- 7 February – Dafydd Elis-Thomas, Baron Elis-Thomas, 78, Welsh politician, llywydd of the Senedd (1999–2011), MP (1974–1992) and member of the House of Lords (since 1992).
- 3 March – Geraint Jarman, 74, Welsh musician, poet and television producer
- 6 April – John Heywood Thomas, 98, minister and philosopher
- 7 April – Brian Jones, 89, Welsh rugby union player (Newport RFC, national team). (death announced on this date)
- 20 April – Jeff Evans, 70, Welsh cricket umpire. (death announced on this date)
- 28 April – Mike Peters, 66, Welsh rock singer (The Alarm) and songwriter ("Sixty Eight Guns"), chronic lymphocytic leukemia.
- 9 May – Mark Jabalé, 91, Egyptian-born monk, Bishop of Menevia 2001–2008
- 22 May – Mark Jones, 59, Welsh rugby league and rugby union player (Hull, Warrington), heart attack.
- 21 June – Dudley Lewis, 62, Welsh footballer (Swansea City, Huddersfield Town, national team). (death announced on this date)
- 29 June – Stuart Burrows, 92, Welsh operatic tenor.
- 11 July – Iris Williams, 79, Welsh singer. (death announced on this date)
- 17 July – Wyn Davies, 83, Welsh footballer (Newcastle United, Bolton Wanderers, national team). (death announced on this date)
- 22 July – Joey Jones, 70, Welsh footballer (Wrexham, Liverpool, national team).
- 23 July – Jeffery Rowthorn, 91, Welsh Anglican bishop and hymnographer.
- 9 August – Terry Hennessey, 82, Welsh footballer (Birmingham City, Nottingham Forest, national team).
- 12 August – Hefin David, 47, politician, Member of the Senedd (2016–2025).
- 26 August – Geoff Lewis, 89, jockey
- 11 October – Ian Watkins, 48, Welsh singer (Lostprophets) and convicted paedophile, stabbed.
- 25 October – Tony Adams, 84, Welsh actor (Crossroads, Doctor Who, General Hospital).
- 15 November – Rod Thomas, 78, Welsh footballer (Swindon Town, Cardiff City, national team).
- 19 November – Alun Gibbard, 65, Welsh writer and broadcaster
- 21 November – Hazel Walford Davies, 85, academic and writer
- 25 November – Mike Watkins, 73, Welsh rugby union player (Cardiff, Newport, national team). (death announced on this date)
- 14 December – Shân Legge-Bourke, 82, Welsh landowner.
- 28 December - Hugh Morris, 62, cricketer (Glamorgan, England). (death announced on this date)

== See also ==
- 2025 in Northern Ireland
- 2025 in Scotland
- 2025 in Ireland
