= IWC =

IWC may refer to:

== Organisations ==
- Industrial Welfare Commission, Californian wage regulation body
- Institute for Workers' Control, a defunct British Marxist organisation
- International Water Centre, provides education and training, applied research and expert services in integrated water resource management
- International Whaling Commission, international body regulating whaling
- International Wheat Council, former name of the International Grains Council
- International Wolf Center, a wolf education facility based in Minnesota
- Irish Wildbird Conservancy, former name of BirdWatch Ireland

== Events ==
- IAAF World Challenge, an annual global circuit of fourteen one-day athletics competitions organized by the IAAF
- Independent Water Commission, British government review of water industry regulation
- International Wheelset Congress, an annual international rail conference
- UIAA Ice Climbing World Cup, and annual tour event that is also known as the IWC

== Companies ==
- Industrial Water Cooling, a cooling tower manufacturer in Johannesburg, South Africa
- Imperial War Cabinet, the British Empire's wartime coordinating group
- International Watch Company, a luxury Swiss watch manufacturer

== Other ==
- Inch of water (Inches Water Column), a measure of pressure
- Internet wrestling community, a nickname given to online postings or forums by fans of professional wrestling
- Iowa Wesleyan College, a liberal arts college located in Mount Pleasant, Iowa
- International Wrestling Cartel, a professional wrestling promotion based in Pittsburgh
