= Troika (ride) =

1970s amusement park ride

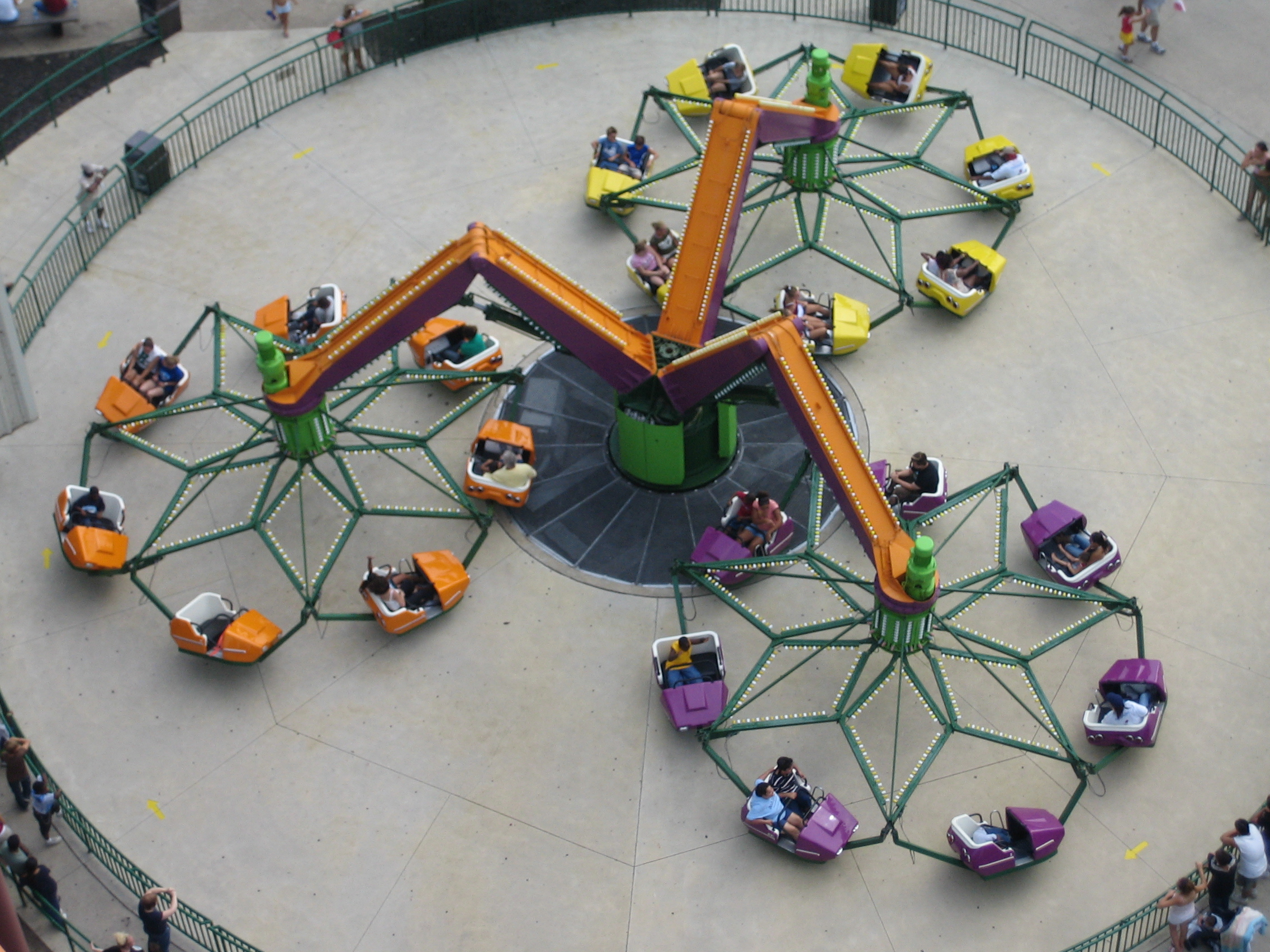
Troika at Cedar Point in Sandusky, OH

The Troika is an amusement park ride designed and manufactured by HUSS Park Attractions in the mid-1970s. The name Troika means "group of three" in Russian, a reference to its three armed design. There are several variations on the design.

== Design ==
HUSS Park Attractions designed and manufactured the first Troika ride in the mid-1970s. It is named after the Russian word meaning "group of three", a reference to its three armed design.

== Description and operation ==
Video of the Troika ride at Cedar Point.

A Troika consists of three arms radiating from a central column. At the end of each arm is a wheel-like assembly (star) holding seven gondolas, each of which seats 2 people side by side.

When the ride is activated, the central column rotates clockwise, while the Star at the end of each arm rotates counterclockwise. Hydraulic cylinders then raise the arms to an angle of 40°. The gondolas do have some capacity to rock from side to side, but this is minimal. At the end of the ride cycle, the arms are lowered, and the rotation stopped. Because it is a relatively mild thrill ride, it is a good ride for younger children or beginning riders who aren't up to riding more extreme attractions, like Huss's own Enterprise or Top Spin.

The main safety restraint is a buzz bar system, which locks into one of five positions. Huss recommends that riders be at least 42 inches tall with an adult or over 50 inches tall to ride alone.

== Variants and modern adaptions ==
The ride is available in both transportable and permanent forms, although due to the total weight and size of the ride (35 tons, plus an additional 27 tons for the temporary base and platform), transportable Troikas are unpopular and uncommon.

Portable versions of the Troika can be disassembled, but due to the size and weight of the machinery and platform, rack onto no fewer than three trailers.

=== AirBoat ===
Huss now makes a modern version of the Troika, called the AirBoat. It is smaller and can only carry 24 people (with 3 pods and 4 cars per pod). It runs at about the same speed. One example that is no longer running was the Gator Bait ride at Six Flags New Orleans; this ride closed due to damage from Hurricane Katrina in 2005.

=== Scorpion ===
The Tivoli Scorpion is based on the same pattern as the Troika, but a much smaller gondola wheel diameter results in greater speed and centripetal force experienced by the riders (claimed to be over 100 kilometres per hour (62 mph)). The Scorpion is significantly lighter than a Troika, making it more popular for operation at carnivals and fairs.

== Troika Installations ==
Name	Park	Country	Manufacturer	Opened	Closed	Details
Scorpion	Adventure Island	United Kingdom	Tivoli	2001	2018	Now operates as a travelling fair ride.
Troika	Adventureland	United States	HUSS	1976	1983	Leased to park by German immigrant Willy Miller.
Troika	Al-Rawdah Sharaco Amusement Park	Saudi Arabia	HUSS	1988	Closed	Park and ride presumed closed.
Тройка (Troika)	All-Russia Exhibition Center	Russia	HUSS	1976	2016	
Тройка (Troika)	Anapa	Russia	HUSS	2018	Open	Originally manufactured 1974.
Turbo Star	Alton Towers	United Kingdom	HUSS	1984	1989	
Tomahawk	Attractiepark Slagharen	Netherlands	HUSS		Open	
Unknown	Barry Island Pleasure Park		HUSS		Closed	Now operates at Carowinds
Adrenaline Test Zone	Calaway Park	Canada	HUSS		Open	
Triple Play	California's Great America	United States	HUSS	1976	2004	
Do-Si-Do	Carowinds	United States	HUSS	2017	Open	Previously traveled with German showman Schafer between 1974 and 1976 before operating at several European parks between 2004 and 2010. Sold to Cedar Fair among other European flat rides.
Troika	Cedar Point	United States	HUSS	1976	Open	
Unknown	Coney Beach Pleasure Park	Wales	HUSS		Closed	Now operates at Carowinds
Kaleidoscope	Dorney Park & Wildwater Kingdom	United States	HUSS	2017	Open	
Troika	Dreamland Margate			1983	1997	
Troika	Elitch Gardens Theme Park	United States	HUSS	1995	Open	Originally manufactured 1976.
Goldcurse	Familiepark Drievliet	Netherlands	HUSS		Open	Includes extensive theming package. Previously operated as Turbo Star. Serial number 26360.
Troika	Fuji-Q Highland	Japan	HUSS		Closed	
Troika	Fun Spot Amusement Park & Zoo	United States	HUSS		2008	Standing but not operating after park closed. Removed sometime between 2011 and 2015 and relocated to Santa's Village AZoosment Park.
Wellenreiter (Wave Rider)	Hansa-Park	Germany	HUSS	1978	Open	
Scorpion	Horn Luna Park	Serbia	Tivoli Enterprises	1997	Open	Traveling version.
Bad Apple	Kings Dominion	United States	HUSS	2002	Open	
Shake, Rattle & Roll	Kings Island	United States	HUSS	1975	Open	Serial number 26731.
Humla	Kongeparken	Norway		1997	Open	
Diablo	La Ronde	Canada		1978	2003	
Troika	Linnanmäki	Finland	HUSS	1974	1974	Relocated to Särkänniemi. Ride originally bought for Särkänniemi, but Särkänniemi did not open until 1975 and so the ride was rented to Linnanmäki for 1974 season.
Unknown	Loudoun Castle	United Kingdom	HUSS		Closed	Now operates at Carowinds
Tumble Bug	Luna Park Sydney	Australia	HUSS	1995	2020	
L'aigle Noir (The Black Eagle)	OK Corral Theme Park	France	HUSS	1970	Open	
Super Star	Palace Playland	United States		1980s	Open	
Tri-Star	Pleasureland Southport	United Kingdom		1974	1983	Built under license by English firm Bennett. Relocated to Spanish City.
Tri-Star	Pleasureland Southport	United Kingdom	Fairmatt	2013	Open	
Unknown	Pleasurewood Hills	United Kingdom	HUSS		Closed	Now operates at Carowinds
Tri-Nado	Santa's Village AZoosment Park	United States	HUSS	2015	Open	Relocated from Fun Spot Amusement Park & Zoo.
Troika	Särkänniemi	Finland		1975	Open	
Riptide Rescue	Sea World San Antonio	United States	Huss		Open	Airboat
Riptide Rescue	Seaworld San Diego	United States	Huss		Open	Airboat
Spider	Selva Magica	Mexico			Open	
Warp 2000	Six Flags AstroWorld	United States	HUSS	1981	2005	Most parts moved to Six Flags Over Texas for usage on its Troika.
Thrillbilly	Six Flags Darien Lake	United States	HUSS	1979	1983	Ride removed with changes in park ownership.
Triple Play	Six Flags Great America	United States	HUSS	1976	Open	
Wild Flower	Six Flags Great Adventure	United States	HUSS	1975	1977	Previously Wild Rider.
Gator Bait	Six Flags New Orleans	United States	HUSS		2005	AirBoat version. No longer in operation after Hurricane Katrina but still standing.
Harley Quinn Spinsanity	Six Flags Over Texas	United States	HUSS	2006	2017	Previously Crazy Legs. Relocated from Six Flags AstroWorld.
Tri-Star	Spanish City			1984	1984	Relocated from Pleasureland Southport.
Scorpion	Talley Amusements, Inc. (Showman)	United States	Tivoli		Open	
Calgary Stampede	Thorpe Park	United Kingdom		1993	2003	
Troika	Toshimaen	Japan	HUSS		2020	
Mustang Runner	Worlds of Fun	United States	HUSS	2017	Open	
Dancing Queen	Unknown - German Showman	Germany			Open	Traveling version in Germany.

== See also ==
- Twist (ride)
