= Hypervalue =

Former retail store in Wales and England

- Founded: 1980
- Founder: Ken Rogers

Hyper Value (Holdings) Limited was incorporated in 1980 by Ken Rogers, the founder and then Chairman of the Hypervalue Group. It was best known for the discount retail stores that encompassed the whole of South Wales, extending into the South West of England and as far away as Southampton. As of late 2006, the company entered into a creditors voluntary arrangement. The group's flagship store at Pontypridd closed Friday 14 September 2007. The only remaining Hyper Value store is still running on the famous Barry Island and has become known as the place to go for all Gavin & Stacey merchandise.

The retail group started as a market stall held by Ken Rogers which he leased on the Barry Island Pleasure Park around 25 years ago – later on Hypervalue owned the pleasure park.

== Financial problems ==
In August 2006, 50% of the company was bought by Hilco, a company specialising in selling off assets from failing retail businesses. Four stores were sold to Buyology (retailer) in October 2006 and 4 more in December 2006. Six stores were sold to Ian Rogers for his new business Hypa Xtra as part of a deal which saw Hilco agree to a joint venture to acquire and operate Barry Island Pleasure Park, Dolphin bar and KR's nightclub in Barry. All Hypa Extra stores have now ceased trading, it appears, as they have all been removed of existing stock and most buildings are minus their signage. However, the one store situated on the seafront of Barry Island has been renamed to 'Bargain Master' although it is still run by the Rogers family, and still displays the old Hyper Value signage.

Creditors received 45p in the pound.

Hilco acquired 4 ex Focus "NO FRILLS" stores in 2008 and converted them to Hyper Value Retail format. Hilco was envisioning a grand reopening in May. Not all stores got the grand reopening, which in turn left the customers thinking the store(s) had closed for good. This Hyper Value Retail venture was to add value in a variety of ways. In particular to purchase special buys and purchase distressed stock while operating a full line DIY operation. In May 2009, Closing Down signage was put up around these stores and Hilco are hoping to close these by the end of July.

== Musical reference ==
- Hyper Value features in the lyrics to the song 'Guns Don't Kill People Rappers Do' by Goldie Lookin' Chain
