= Industrial Water Cooling =

South African cooling tower manufacturer

Industrial Water Cooling (IWC) is a manufacturer of cooling towers in South Africa. The company's headquarters are in Isando, Ekurhuleni.

The company primarily supplies cooling towers to the following industrial sectors: power generation; mining; petrochemical industries; sugar; steel; food & beverage; air-conditioning and refrigeration.

The company has undertaken projects for companies such as Sasol, ArcelorMittal, Foskor, and Eskom.

== History ==
IWC was founded in 1986. In September 2011, the South Africa-based private equity investment management company, Medu Capital, acquired a 62% equity interest in the company.

In 2013, IWC entered into an agreement with Danish plate heat exchanger manufacturer Sondex to supply its replacement plates and gaskets in sub-Saharan Africa.

In the same year IWC opened a glass-reinforced plastic manufacturing facility in Isando, Ekuhleni, one of only two GRP plants of this kind in South Africa.

== Acquisitions ==
In August 2014, IWC announced the acquisition of Tektower, formerly known as Sulzer Cooling, a South African-based cooling tower manufacturer, to expand its African operations. Tektower now operates as a subsidiary of IWC.

In September 2014, the company acquired the Vectus Pipe system from Fiberpipe; a pipe system manufactured from glass fibre reinforced polyester and vinylester and widely used in the oil and gas, shipbuilding and offshore industries.
