= Denbigh High School, Denbighshire =

Denbigh High School
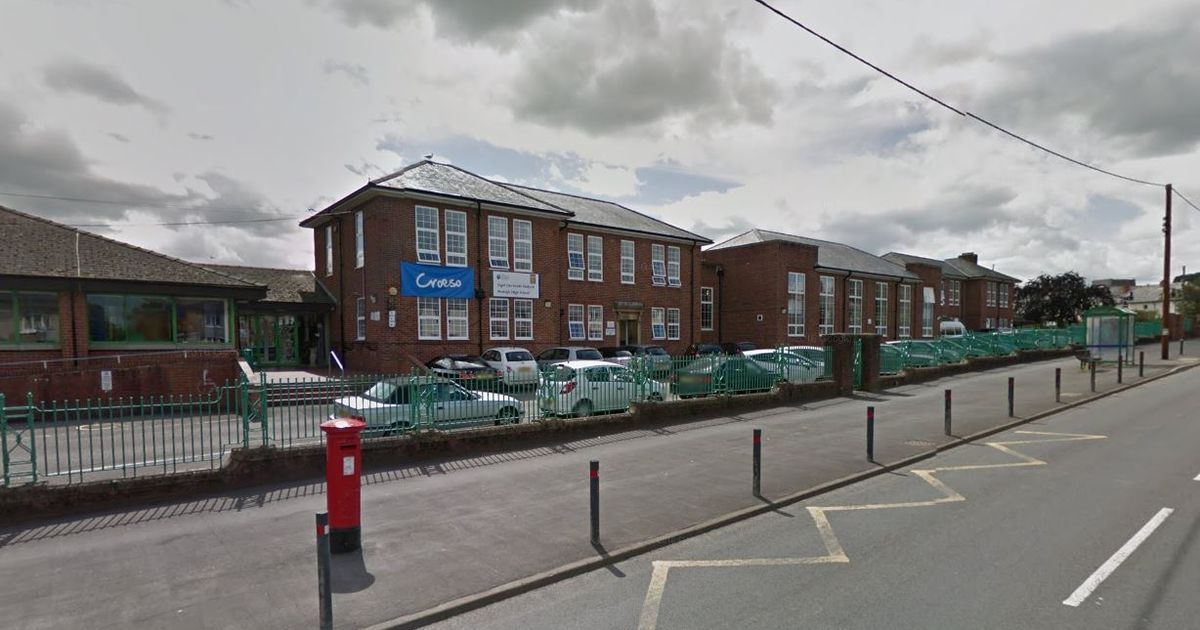

Location
- Ruthin Road; Denbigh, Denbighshire, LL16 3EX; Wales; 53.1856°N 3.4080°W

Information
- Established: 1 September 1939
- Local authority: Denbighshire County Council
- Headteacher: Glen Williams
- Staff: 75
- Gender: Coeducational
- Age: 11 to 18
- Enrolment: 499 (2024)
- Website: http://www.denbighhighschool.co.uk/

Denbigh High School (Welsh: Ysgol Uwchradd Dinbych) is an English medium secondary school based in Denbigh, North Wales. Pupils who attend are between the ages of 11 and 18.

== Overview ==
Denbigh High School is situated on Ruthin Road, Denbigh and had 542 pupils on roll in 2017. About 6% of the learners speak Welsh as a first language or to an equivalent standard. The school serves Denbigh, St Asaph and surrounding rural areas, including Trefnant, Henllan and Tremeirchion.

Denbigh High School forms part of the Dyffryn Clwyd Consortium at A level. This was a partnership agreement with neighbouring schools, St Brigid's School (in Denbigh), Ysgol Brynhyfryd (in Ruthin), Ysgol Glan Clwyd (in St Asaph), and Denbigh College, to provide transport for students who wish to study subjects from different schools. However, in 2018 Ysgol Brynhyfryd and Ysgol Glan Clwyd withdrew from the agreement. The Consortium now consists of Denbigh High School, St Brigid's School, Denbigh College and Llysfasi College.

The school has represented Wales at the F1 in Schools Championship. Team Tachyon competed in Texas and Singapore and, in 2019, Team Quantum were travelling to Abu Dhabi to compete in the World Finals.

The school is monitored by Estyn, which is the education and training inspectorate for Wales. In 2023, after 5 years, the school was removed from the list of schools under special measures due to the improvements made across the teaching and learning targets.

== History ==
The school was originally situated on two separate sites with the first 3 years on the existing site and the older years at an older building on Middle Lane, which is situated half a mile away. This Middle Lane site was built in 1903 as The County School and Denbigh High ceased using it in 1983. The site then became a Youth Club and is used for Teacher Training and Education Administration.

The school is in conjunction with the secondary department of the autistic school Ysgol Plas Brondyffryn, which was built next door in 2003. In September 2009, Maths teacher at the school, Ian Gee, was suspended and later fired from the school when images of child pornography were found on a computer at his home. Investigators found no evidence to suggest criminal activity had taken place on school premises or during school hours. He was banned from working with children for five years.

In December 2011 Paul Evans who was a teacher at the school but also the chief examiner for the WJEC history qualification at the time, was subject to a "sting" operation by the daily Telegraph which triggered an investigation into all examination boards, by the then education secretary Michael Gove. The sting sought to prove allegations that examiners were providing attending teachers with information which they could use to improve students results unfairly. The sting pointed specifically to informing attendees that the questions written by the examiners were subject to a cycle. In the video which is widely available, Evans can be heard admitting to cheating and he further states that the regulator would "probably" tell him off if they knew.

Assistant Headteacher and Performing Arts teacher Gwawr Ceiriog was fired by the school in 2014 for failing to hand over charity raised money for BBC Children in Need, and for pocketing student payments for hoodies. In November 2013, she was ordered to pay £1,400 in compensation.

In September 2016, Denbigh High School placed 72 pupils; mainly girls, in exclusion and isolation on the first day of school, for wearing 'inappropriate' uniform. The case saw coverage from many major news companies and received outcry from parents, many claiming that the uniform is adequate and claiming they could not afford to purchase new uniform.

In August 2017, the school achieved its best set of A Level results in its history, with 77% of students achieving the top grades of A*-C. In 2019, A-Level students achieved the highest percentage of A*-A results in Denbighshire.

It was put in special measures in 2018 by the inspectorate Estyn.

In January 2021, news broke that a former teacher, Alexander Price, had written anonymous blogs about how poorly the school was being managed. Alexander Price wrote many blogs but the one that was alleged to have caused the most offence was entitled "The Problem with Prom". In it he stated that students were encouraged by the school and society to look like 'Eastern European Prostitutes and trans-human Kardashian clones' and made allegations of male students doing cocaine during their Prom. Alexander Price was eventually sacked. NASUWT union official Colin Adkins stated that during this case, Price's dismissal was 'an attempt to provide a cover-up of the school's failings', referring to the fact the school requires special measures by the Welsh Government to improve its performance. The appeal was rejected, but the hearing currently continues.

== Headteachers ==
As of September 2025, the headteacher is Glen Williams who, in his first post as headteacher, has worked to pull the school out of special measures for the first time since 2018. Mr Williams was commended by ESTYN for having “developed a clear and well understood vision for improving attendance and behaviour” across the school community which facilitated the removal of special measures.

Previous headteachers include Dr Paul Evans, Simeon Molloy, Alison Duncan, Bill Bailey, Gwyn D Dodd and Maurice Bitcon.

== Special education partnership ==
The school has a longstanding partnership with Ysgol Plas Brondyffryn, a special needs school catering mainly to pupils with autism spectrum disorders, as well as a smaller number of students diagnosed as having attention-deficit/hyperactivity disorder, dyslexia, cerebral palsy or developmental co-ordination disorder. In 2003 a new Secondary Dept. of Brondyffryn was built behind Denbigh High, and caters for 56 children from North and Mid Wales along with parts of Cheshire and Liverpool. This unit has its own, self-contained science laboratory, design-technology workshop, ICT department and Life Learning (cookery) kitchen. This building forms the senior department of Brondyffryn; the junior department is located near Ysgol Frongoch, and was reconstructed shortly following the senior department.

In 2004, the first full-time transfer from Brondyffryn to Denbigh High took place, and since then there have been several more transitions to full-time mainstream education.

== See also ==
- List of English and Welsh endowed schools (19th century)
