= International Wheelset Congress =

Annual international rail conference

The International Wheelset Congress (IWC) was founded by Lucchini in 1963. The first congress took place in Bergamo, Italy, in that year. Since then, with only two exceptions it has been held every third year. The International Wheelset Congress is the oldest railway technical conference in the world.

One of the premier international rail conferences, The International Wheelset Congress, attracts engineers from the international rail community. The congress provides a platform for rail operators, equipment builders, component suppliers, academia and government, regulatory and standards organisations. It is also a forum for dissemination of technology and advancements in the design and manufacture of rail wheelset components and their performance to promote increased productivity, performance and safety in rail operations.

== Recent meetings ==
The 15th International Wheelset Congress was held in Prague, Czech Republic, in September 2007. The location of the congress is chosen worldwide according to a rotational rule.

The 16th International Wheelset Congress was held at the Cape Town International Convention Centre in Cape Town, South Africa, in March 2010. The event was hosted by Ringrollers Pty Ltd under the auspices of Union des Industries Ferroviaires Européennes (UNIFE) and ERWA.

The 17th International Wheelset Congress was held in Ukraine in 2013 and was hosted by KLW-WheelCo. The main topic of the conference - new technologies increasing the operational life cycle of the wheelsets.

The 19th International Wheelset Congress was held in Venice, Italy in 2019. It was hosted by Lucchini RS. The main topic of the conference was: "Wheelset of the future: an Integrated System". The congress was held from June 16 to 20 at the Fondazione Giorgio Cini, on San Giorgio Island.

== Congress History ==
- 1963 - Bergamo, Italy
- 1966 - Munich, Germany
- 1969 - Sheffield, England
- 1972 - Paris, France
- 1975 - Tokyo, Japan
- 1978 - Colorado Springs, USA
- 1981 - Vienna, Austria
- 1984 - Madrid, Spain
- 1988 - Montreal, Canada
- 1992 - Sydney, Australia
- 1995 - Paris, France
- 1998 - Qingdao, China
- 2001 - Rome, Italy
- 2004 - Orlando, USA
- 2007 - Prague, Czech Republic
- 2010 - Cape Town, South Africa
- 2013 - Kiev, Ukraine
- 2016 - Chengdu, China
- 2019 - Venice, Italy
