= Alun Gibbard =

Welsh author and broadcaster (1960–2025)

Alun Gibbard (30 May 1960 – 19 November 2025) was a Welsh author and broadcaster, well known for his appearances on BBC television and radio. He wrote in Welsh and English and was long associated with the work of Dylan Thomas, at whose birthplace in Swansea he was for a while responsible for visitor education. He co-wrote several biographies (including that of Tony ac Aloma) and autobiographies (such as that of Arfon Haines Davies), as well as novels and short stories. He was a frequent contributor to the magazine Golwg and to the Western Mail.

Originally from Llanelli, the son of historian Noel Gibbard (1932–2021), Alun Gibbard attended Ysgol Gymraeg Brynsierfel and Llanelli Boys' School. He earned his degree from the University of Glamorgan, then a polytechnic.

Programmes he produced for the BBC and S4C included Dechrau Canu, Dechrau Canmol and 100 Arwyr Cymru.

Gibbard died on 19 November 2025, at the age of 65.

== Works ==
His books included:

- Two Dragons - Howard Marks' Wales (with Howard Marks; Y Lolfa, 2010)
- Delme Thomas (Y Lolfa, 2014)
- Scarlets: The Official History (Graffeg, 2015)
- Into the Wind - The Life of Carwyn James (Y Lolfa, 2017)
- Not Just Politics: 'The must read life story of Carwyn Jones and his nine years as Wales' First Minister (with Carwyn James; Headline, 2020)
- Who Beat the All Blacks?: The story behind the most famous club victory in Welsh rugby history (Y Lolfa, 2022)
- Whose Wales (with Gwynoro Jones; Parthian, 2024)
