= Gurnos house fire =

1995 criminal case in Wales

The Gurnos house fire was an arson attack that occurred on the Gurnos housing estate in Merthyr Tydfil, South Wales, on 11 October 1995, resulting in the deaths of three people. The victims were Diane Jones, a 21-year-old mother-of-two, and her daughters, Shauna, 2, and Sarah-Jane, 13 months. As of October 2025, the case remains unsolved.

The fire led to the wrongful conviction of Annette Hewins, who in 1997 was convicted of committing arson with intent to endanger life following a trial at Cardiff Crown Court and sentenced to 13 years in prison. Her niece, Donna Clarke, was also convicted on the same charge and sentenced to 20 years. Both women had their convictions quashed by the Court of Appeal in February 1999, although Clarke faced retrial. She was acquitted in April 1999. A third woman, Denise Sullivan, was convicted of perverting the course of justice and sentenced to four years in custody. This was reduced to three-and-a-half years on appeal. Annette Hewins died in February 2017, a day after being detained at the Royal Glamorgan Hospital amid concerns for her mental health.

In March 2024, the case was the subject of the BBC Wales podcast Wrongly Accused: The Annette Hewins Story.

On 11 October 2025, the 30th anniversary of the fire, South Wales Police announced the launch of a forensic review of the case, using new technology unavailable at the time of the original investigation.
