= Barry Island Pleasure Park =

Amusement park in Glamorgan, Wales

- Previously known as The New Evesham Pleasure Park (1929–1950)
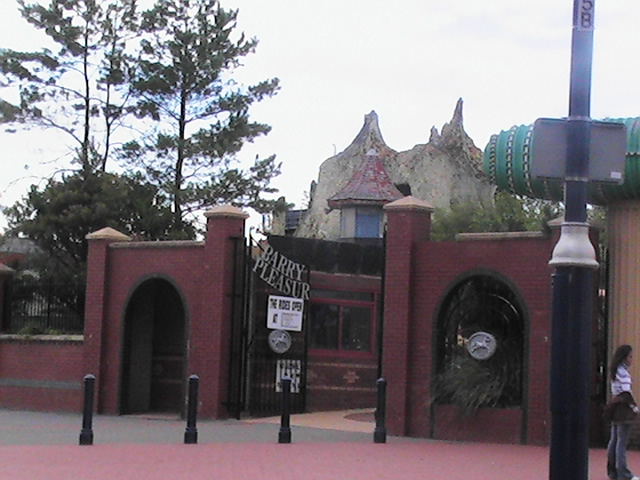
- Interactive map of Barry Island Pleasure Park
- Location: Barry Island Pleasure Park, Barry Island, Barry, Vale of Glamorgan, CF62 5TH, Wales
- Coordinates: 51.3914°N 3.2753°W
- Status: Operating
- Opened: 1897–present
- Owner: Henry Danter
- Operating season: Easter to September

Attractions
- Total: 24 attractions (as of 2022)
- Roller coasters: 3
- Website: www.barryislandpleasurepark.wales

Barry Island Pleasure Park is an amusement park situated on the coast at Barry Island in the Vale of Glamorgan, about 10 miles (16 km) south west of the capital city Cardiff, Wales.

The park opens annually at weekends from Easter onwards and daily during the school summer holidays, until the first weekend in September.

The pleasure park is located opposite the sandy beachfront at Barry and contains a variety of amusements including fairground rides, attractions & food outlets. The surrounding area, known locally as "Barry Island", contains a further variety of shops, bars and restaurants.

There are also several amusement arcades located around the park.

Barry Island Pleasure Park is now owned by showman Henry Danter. As well as investing in brand new rides & attractions he has also announced plans to expand with a nearby holiday camp to complement his pleasure park.

== History ==
=== Access to the island ===
The only access to Barry Island before 1896 had been either by foot across the sands and mud at low tide or by Yellow Funnel Line paddle steamer when the tide was in. As a further incentive for visitors to come to Barry, an extension to the railway line, through a boxed in tunnel on a 250 yards (230 m) long pier structure, was built from the mainland to a new station next to the main Barry Pierhead. This enabled visitors to board the paddle steamers that plied in the Channel to Bristol, Clevedon and Weston-super-Mare. Once the rail link was completed the visitor numbers to the island exploded and one Bank Holiday weekend, over 150,000 visitors were recorded arriving on the island, and most of those came by train. Trains were arriving every ten minutes and by 5 p.m. were leaving at the same rate. The station opened in time for the August Bank Holiday week in 1896 giving the impetus for the development of further attractions on the island.

=== Early rides ===
Until 1897, there was no established fairground on the island apart from a few carousels run by Bavarian showman Jacob Studt, a set of swing-boats hand-made by Sydney White of Cardiff and a playground slide set up on the main beach for each summer season. In that year the first major ride attraction was built. A Switchback Railway had been designed and built by the famous American coaster engineer LaMarcus Thompson specially for the Cardiff Empire Exhibition at Sophia Gardens in 1896, dismantled following the year-long exhibition and put up for sale. It was bought by the White family and installed at the western end of the beach edge on the present day site of The Olde Pavilion Café (named after the Pavilion Theatre, which had been situated amongst the sand-dunes). Barry Athletic Club's car park now stands where the Switchback ride ended.

With no competition the Switchback was a very popular and crowded attraction with Victorian holidaymakers and day trippers from the South Wales Valleys for fifteen years until a much larger Figure 8 roller coaster, also built by LaMarcus Thompson, opened on the edge of the beach level with the present pleasure park site in the spring of 1912. The Switchback's trade declined, in competition with the more exciting Figure Eight and it only operated for another two years, finally closing in 1914 just as World War I in Europe started and the number of holiday visitors dropped off dramatically. A military hospital was established on the island, near the fairground and thousands of injured soldiers recuperated on the beaches and sand-dunes.

=== A change of ownership ===
When in 1923 Barry Town Council replaced the previous rough tarmac shoreline roadway with a new brick and concrete Promenade, together with a more substantial road connection with the mainland constructed along a raised causeway, the fairground was relocated from the beach onto its current permanent site where the sand dunes were levelled and the site enclosed inside an iron railing fence. The White Bros (sons of Sydney White who died in 1938 at the age of 78), who held the beach concession, bid for and became the first tenants of the newly formed Barry Island Pleasure Park on land rented from the Whitmore Bay Pavilion Syndicate.

The White brothers remained in control of the park until the close of the 1929 season. That year the White Brothers had outbid Pat Collins, showman from the Collins fairground dynasty, for his lease on a highly profitable and major pleasure park at Evesham in the West Midlands, that served day trippers from metropolitan Birmingham and Wolverhampton. When the brothers returned from a period of touring with their mobile fair rides and tried to renew their own Barry Island lease, the following year in 1930, they were stunned to discover that Pat Collins had outbid them on their home territory.

To make it clear why he had taken this step Collins, tongue in cheek, renamed the park as 'The New Evesham Pleasure Park', a name it carried until 1950. The White Bros moved their operations across the road to a new and much smaller site, which they named 'White's Cosy Corner' and established a restaurant, an amusement arcade and a dodgem cars rink. Cosy Corner was destroyed by arson in 1999 and the shell demolished, but after several stalled planning applications the site was redeveloped and reopened in 2007 as a family entertainments centre.

=== Visitor numbers increase ===
A measure of the growth in trade on the island is that in 1934 during the seven days of the August Bank Holiday week the official estimate of the number of visitors to the fairground was in excess of 400,000. It was recorded that 1,200 coaches and char-a-bancs, 8,000 motor cars, 3,000 motor cycles and over 10,000 bicycles had paid for parking or garaging during the week. In addition rail and public bus services had brought tens of thousands more to the island. The 1938 Bank Holiday Monday saw a crowd of over 250,000 arrive at the island in a single day. Cars, buses and motor cyclists had to be diverted by harassed police to carparks at the Knap, Porthkerry Park, and even as far away as Sully and Rhoose when it was found that it was impossible to cram any more vehicles on the island. By six o'clock in the evening the homeward trek began with a continuous slow moving line of cars and buses stretching all the way from Barry to the roundabout at Culverhouse Cross in Cardiff. A resident in Colcot Road reported that she had been kept awake by the continuous rumble of traffic passing her house till well after three AM on the Tuesday morning.

=== Scenic Railway ===
In 1938, Pat Collins secured the contract to provide the major rides at Billy Butlin's fairground to be attached to the Glasgow Empire Exhibition. His younger brother John designed a Scenic Railway as a direct copy of the Great Yarmouth Scenic Railway also installed for Pat in 1932 (as a rebuild of the Erich Heidrich designed 1929 - 1931 Paris Colonial Exposition Scenic Railway), but with slightly larger dimensions and at an enormous cost of £150,000 (£4,000,000 in today's terms). When the exhibition closed the ride was dismantled and shipped to Liège, Belgium, where it was to form the centerpiece of the planned International Water Exhibition. The ride was nearing completion in late 1939 when Nazi Germany undertook the surprise invasion of Poland and World War II broke out. Construction was ceased and the ride dismantled again before being brought back to the UK and rebuilt instead at Barry Island, on a site originally occupied by St. Peirio's Monastery (Barry Island was once known as Ynys Peirio).

With a track of just over a mile long and an initial climb and drop of seventy two feet it was the biggest wood built roller coaster ever erected in the UK. It was also one of the last such railways to be built in this country. Arriving on the island in the late autumn of 1939 the ride was built over the winter and was ready to be opened by Easter 1940. Along with the other traditional scenic railways the ride's wooden framework was covered in rippled thick plaster and painted to resemble a rocky mountain landscape. The original colour scheme featured turquoise and purple rocks with white tips at the highest points to represent snow. In later years the ride was painted in shades of brown and green before returning to its original turquoise. The massive ride only just fitted into the available space and ran almost the full length of the park, although the top entrance (giving access to the island's railway station) had to be moved by several yards.

The Scenic Railway towered over Barry Island for the next thirty three years and remained a popular attraction throughout its operating life. The structure was partially dismantled, serviced and rebuilt in 1963 but the ride had to be demolished in 1973 after being badly damaged in a severe winter gale and deemed uneconomical to repair. It was also becoming outdated and unable to compete with the newer and more modern high speed 'white knuckle' enclosed-steel-runner 360° looping thrill rides that were starting to be introduced.

The site would be occupied by the famous and much smaller Log Flume ride built during 1980. Wooden beams from the Scenic Railway were salvaged, stored and reused in the construction of the Flume and other beams formed the basis of the Wacky Goldmine (now renamed the Haunted Mine) which was destroyed in a controlled fire in September 2014. Log Flume would in turn be demolished in April 2015.

=== Changes at the Pleasure Park ===
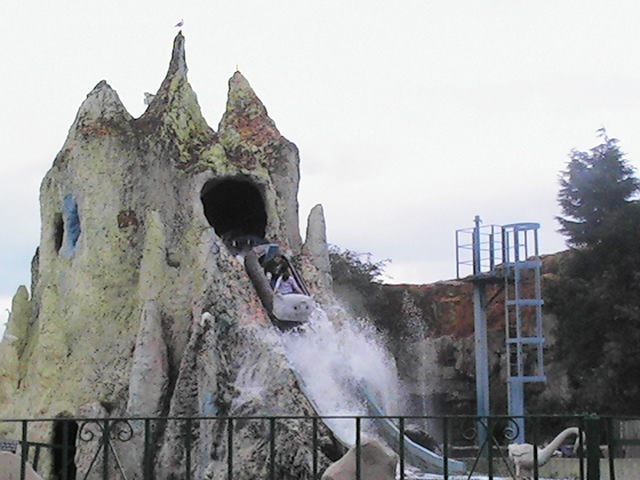
Logflume at Barry Island, partially constructed with the timbers originally from the historic scenic railway

In 1950, an ailing Pat Collins had handed over control of the park to his younger brother, John, who took over and ran the fairground until 1966, when it was passed on to John's two young sons, also named in the family tradition John and Pat. That year the Butlins holiday camp opened and provided the park with more regular customers than it had ever had before. With the increased income generated by Butlins campers the Collins brothers purchased the freehold rights to the Pleasure Park in 1969.

Apart from the years immediately after the park opened, the busiest and most profitable period were the ten years spanning the opening of Butlins in 1966 and the mid-1970s when foreign package holidays started to grow. Apart from the Scenic Railway, the Waltzer, several carousels and most of the side stalls that were owned and operated by the Collins brothers the majority of the other major rides in the park were operated by another fairground dynasty family (since the mid-19th century), the Summers. George Summers was a major employer between the late 1950s and his death in the early 1970s when control of the firm was handed to George's sons Robert and George Jr. Other rides were operated by John Corrigan from the historical showground family.

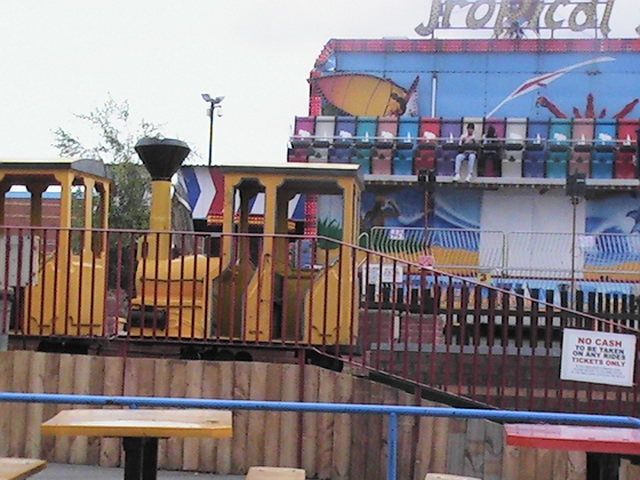
Other rides at Barry

The Summers family ran the Big Wheel, Dive Bomber, Moon Rocket, Revolving Jets and Tipping Paratrooper rides along with the Mirror Maze, two One Arm Bandit Arcades and several "Prize every time"

The Collins brothers went their separate ways during the early 1980s, and Pat took the reins himself. Due to a later bankruptcy the park then changed hands, and bought by Ken Rogers, the millionaire owner of the Hypervalue Group, a chain of twelve "£1 an item" budget stores in South Wales. Rogers had been attempting to buy the pleasure park for several years, mainly because his Hypervalue brand had been born twenty five years earlier in the form of a tiny market stall on a rental site near the main entrance to the Barry Pleasure Park.

== Pre Danter ==
After securing ownership of the park Ken Rogers made improvements, including the demolition and construction of the major rides. In 2000, just as the park's fortunes had been turned round, Rogers died suddenly and ownership passed to his son Ian. Following a restructure of the business, Hypervalue is now trading as Hyper Xtra and is owned 50/50 between Ian Rogers and Hilco UK, including the pleasure park. For the 2010, 2011 and 2012 seasons the park has been let to an independent showman Vernon Studt, a descendant of Jacob Studt who operated the original beach carousels in the 1890s. In 2014 Vernon Studt pulled out of the Pleasure Park. Investment in Barry Island Pleasure Park continued in consultation with the local authority.

Pat Collins, the son of John Collins, as well as Pat Collins's son also named Pat Collins, still maintains a presence on the Island and holds the lease for The Square on the Promenade where he first established four rides on the site, including a helter-skelter, children's go-karts, a trampoline and a flight simulator module. Their rides for 2011 and 2012 were Stagecoach-Horse and Carriage ride, Teacups, Swinging chairs, Hook-a-duck, Bungees, Trampolines, Balloon Wheel and Slide. They lease the Pirate Adventure Golf Course nearby the Square.

Patrick Collins (Jnr) also leases Porthkerry Forest Cafe and the deck chairs on Barry Island as well as operating a kiosk selling sweets, opposite the former Butlins site and Pleasure Park.

== Henry Danter Era ==
Showman Henry Danter, and his family, continued with their £20m investment plan after purchasing the park, in which they hope to see the fairground attraction and Barry Island transformed into Wales’ top tourist destination within the next five years.

Danter has brought a number of new attractions to the park, including the £1.2m Pirate River log flume, the Barry Eye Ferris Wheel, Cyclone and Aerospace, the largest attraction at the park to date.

Danter has also announced plans to build a holiday park on nearby land purchased. Danter stated that this will provide accommodation to those visiting the pleasure park and the surrounding area.

== Rides ==
There are 24 attractions at the park:

- Aerospace
- Big Wheel
- Crazy Frog
- Crazy Fun House
- Cyclone
- Disco Fever
- Dodgems
- Dragon Challenge
- Gallopers
- Ghost Train
- Gravitron
- Hellraiser
- High Altitude
- Jets
- Pirate River
- Runaway Train
- Sizzler
- Super Trooper
- Thunderbolt Waltzer
- Top Scan
- Tornado
- Typhoon
- Viva Mexico

== Notable past rides ==
Opened	Closed	Ride name	Manufacturer	Notes
1887	1912	Switchback		Wooden side-friction rollercoaster.
1912	1939	Figure Eight		Wooden side-friction rollercoaster.
1939	1973	Scenic Railway		Wooden side-friction rollercoaster.
1984	1988	Flitzer	Zierer	Steel Flitzer rollercoaster.
1994	2009	Viper	Interpark	Steel Galaxi rollercoaster. Relocated to Clacton Pier as "Steel Stella".
2008	2008	Go-Gator	Wisdom Rides	A junior e-powered rollercoaster.
2010	2012	Family Coaster	Supercar	A junior rollercoaster.
2015	2015	Junior Coaster		A junior wacky worm rollercoaster.
1970s	2009	Jungle Ride	Alan Hawes	A scenic boat ride.
1960s	c.1973	Ghost Train	Supercar	A double-decked ghost train. Closed to become Uncle Frankenstein's Scream Machine.
c.1974	c.1983	Uncle Frankenstein's Scream Machine	Supercar	Designed by John Wardley, used part of the previous Ghost Train ride.
c.1975	2009	Whacky Goldmine (later The Haunted Mine)	Modern Products	A dark ride. Whacky Goldmine was a redesign by John Wardley of a previous ride.
1980	2009	Log Flume	Reverchon Industries	A custom log flume (ride) around a themed mountain, designed by John Wardley.
1995	2005	Rhythm Dancer	William Thurston	A Breakdance (ride).
1996	2006	Gallopers	Mardi Gras	Modern version of classic gallopers ride.
1988	1995	Gallopers	Walker	classic gallopers ride. Formerly operated on Bridlington seafront.
1951	1956	Dive Bomber	Lusse	The park's first dive bomber ride.
1961	1965	Dive Bomber	Lusse	The park's second dive bomber ride.
1980	1983	Enterprise	HUSS Park Attractions	An Enterprise (ride). Relocated to Harbour Park, Littlehampton.
2001	2009	Evolution	Fabbri Group	An Evolution (ride).
1976	1980s	"Telecombat	Marbiere	A telecombat jets ride.
1959	1975	"Vampire Jets"	Lang Wheels	A classic jets ride, with an added tipping motion.
1995	2006	"Magic Carpet"	Fabbri Group	A flying carpet ride.
1981	1985	"Matterhorn"	Reverchon Industries	A Matterhorn (ride).
1966	1967	"Paratrooper"	Ivan Bennett	The park's first paratrooper ride. An upright version.
1973	1982	"Paratrooper"	Ivan Bennett	The park's second paratrooper ride. A lifting version.
1983	1986	"Hang Glider"	Maxwell	The park's third paratrooper ride. A lifting version.
1981	1984	"Pirat"	HUSS Park Attractions	A Pirate Ship (ride).
1995	2009	"Sea Ray"	Mulligan	A Pirate Ship (ride).
1987	1988	"Explorer"	Reverchon Industries	The park's first explorer/quasar ride.
1991	1994	"Quasar"	A.R.M.	The park's second explorer/quasar ride. Relocated from Butlin's Pwllheli.
1984	1980s	"Turbo Star"	HUSS Park Attractions	A Troika (ride). Operated at Coney Beach Pleasure Park between 1977 and 1983.
1985		"Traum Boot"	Weber	A Ranger (ride).
1995	2006	"Vortex"	Frank Hrubetz & Company	A Round Up (ride).
2001	2007	"Superstar"	Northern Amusements	A superstar/move-it ride.
1985	2009	"Waltzer"	Maxwell	A classic Waltzer ride. Relocated from Ocean Beach, South Shields.
1986	1994	"Century 2000"	Bakker Denies	A ramba zamba ride. Relocated from Mablethorpe Amusement Park. Sold to Coney Beach Pleasure Park.
1995	2000	"Ramba Zamba"	Bakker Denies	A ramba zamba ride.
1979	1983	"Swingaround"	HUSS Park Attractions	A swingaround ride. Relocated from Nordisk Tivoli Park.
1983	1986	"Sizzler"	P.W.S.	A modern Twist (ride).
2002	2007	"Twister"	Sonacase	A modern Twist (ride).
1975	1980	"People Mover"	Walldren Engineering	A classic grasscutter Twist (ride).
1992	1993	"Satellite"	Maxwell	A trabant/satellite ride. Relocated to Mablethorpe Amusement Park.
1962	1974	"Flying Coaster"	Lang Wheels	A flying coaster/ski jump ride. Relocated to Coney Beach Pleasure Park.
1975	1982	"Ferris Wheel"	Hayes Fabrication	A classic Ferris Wheel ride.

== See also ==
- List of British theme parks
- Barry Island railway station
