= Coney Beach Pleasure Park =

Amusement park in Mid Glamorgan, Wales

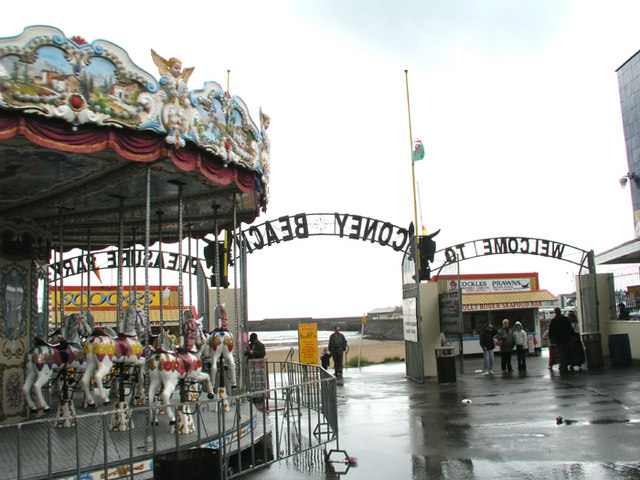
- Interactive map of Coney Beach Pleasure Park
- Location: Eastern Promenade, Porthcawl, Bridgend area, CF36 5BY, Wales
- Coordinates: 51.4797°N 3.6967°W
- Status: Defunct
- Opened: 1918
- Owner: Evans family
- Operating season: End of February to 5 November

Attractions
- Total: 25+
- Roller coasters: 2
- Water rides: 2
- Other rides: 23
- Website: Official website

Coney Beach Pleasure Park was a small amusement park in Porthcawl, Mid Glamorgan in Wales, opened in 1918 and in operation from the end of February until 5 November. The park was permanently shut down on 5 October 2025.

== History ==
=== Early days ===
Coney Beach Pleasure Park opened in 1918, reportedly originally to entertain American troops returning from World War I. It was named as a tribute to the New York amusement park on Coney Island. In 1920 a Figure Eight wooden roller coaster was relocated from West Glamorgan and initially operated from an old World War I aircraft hangar. This particular attraction continued to operate until July 1981, when it was dropped as part of an attempt to modernise the look of the park for contemporary audiences of the 1980s. Other attractions in the early days included a bandstand on the town green nearby, an outdoor and indoor skating rink, three cinemas, a Pierrot stage, and donkey and pony rides on the adjacent beach.

Another notable ride, the Water Chute (similar to the later Vikingar at Pleasure Beach Blackpool), opened in 1936; Sir Leslie Joseph, an amusement park entrepreneur who operated the Coney Beach park, built similar rides at several of his parks. It operated until 1995 and dominated the skyline nearest the beach.

In September 1939, following the outbreak of World War II, the park was temporarily closed as the 15th battalion of the Welsh Regiment was based at the Coney Beach site; later on, the Belgian Brigade's armoured car division were also billeted there until the unit left Porthcawl in 1942. Normal service was resumed after war's end in April 1946.

=== Commercial peak ===
Porthcawl had already been a popular holiday destination for locals in South Wales for many years, and the park attained modest popularity throughout the second half of the 1940s as the UK recovered from the after-effects of World War II. However, it was in the 1950s that the park experienced its first boom in popularity; events such as boxing matches, firework displays and aerial acrobat shows organised by the Royal Air Force drew in crowds of hundreds from all over Wales, and, as transport links improved further following the extension of the M4 motorway into South Wales in the 1960s and 1970s, Porthcawl experienced a dramatic rise in tourists visiting the area from all over the UK, and the park was one of the town's leading attractions. Further events, such as open air markets, circuses, and professional darts and snooker tournaments/exhibitions were staged. By the late 1980s, thousands of people visited the park from all over the world as more road and rail improvements in South Wales saw easier access from Cardiff Wales Airport.

=== Decline and announced closure ===
The 1990s saw a downturn in the park's fortunes. From 1994 onwards, a chain of incidents at the park led to repeated negative publicity, causing the number of visitors to fall. In one of these, a gantry fell onto the track of the Water Chute, possibly because of damage from high winds, causing a number of cars to be derailed and killing a 9-year-old boy. The stigma of the accident saw the numbers of people who used the ride rapidly decline and it was closed in 1995 and demolished in 2000.

In March 2023, the owners of the park, the Evans family, announced that they had sold the park site to the Welsh Government. The sale included an adjacent site known as the Monster Park. In July 2025, they announced that the park would close permanently in October 2025. Bridgend Council and the Welsh Government plan to redevelop the waterfront, including the site of the park. The park's last day was to have been 4 October 2025; the final closure occurred on 5 October, with a fireworks show that evening marking the event.

== Rides ==
- "Beach Party" Afterburner
- Break Dance (New for 2023)
- Paratrooper
- Ghost Train
- "Miami Madness" Miami
- "Thunderdome" Waltzer
- "Wacky Worm" Roller Coaster
- "Sizzler" Twist
- "Fantasia" Super Bob
- Dodgems
- Go-Karts
- Rotor
- "Bounce" Jump & Smile
- "Go Gator" Junior Coaster
- Jumbo Circus Fun House
- "Nessi" Roller Coaster

== Notable Past Rides ==
Opened	Closed	Name	Manufacturer	Description
1983	1988	"Rainbow"	HUSS Park Attractions	A Rainbow ride, later sold to Australia.
1985	2016	"Kingdom Of Evil"		A walkthrough themed to medieval horror with animated figures and special effects. Had an elaborate facade and sound effects outside.
1952	2015	"Santa Fe Railroad"	Supercar	A juvenile track ride with train engine shaped vehicles.
1984	1988	"Caterpillar"	Henri De Vos	A traditional caterpillar ride - the park's second.
1947	1973	"Dive Bomber"	Lusse	A traditional Dive Bomber ride. Later operated at American Adventure Theme Park.
1936	1995	"Water Chute"	Leslie Joseph	A circular water chute, pulled down after an accident.
1981	2010	"Enterprise"	HUSS Park Attractions	An Enterprise (ride). Originally owned by German showman Schafer. Sold to showman Paul Hart in 2010.
1977	1983	"Turbo Star"	HUSS Park Attractions	A Troika (ride), owned by German showman Schafer between 1974 and 1976. Later operated at Barry Island Pleasure Park.
1982	1995	"Cyclone"	Pinfari	A standard Z40 Rollercoaster, replaced by Mega Blitz.
1996	2009	"Mega Blitz"	Pinfari	An RC50 Rollercoaster, replaced by Go-Karts.
1980s	2004	"Blizzard"	Cavazza Diego	A small family rollercoaster.
1920	1981	"Figure 8"		A traditional side-friction wooden rollercoaster, replaced by "Cyclone".
1995	2000	"Skymaster"	A.R.M.	A Voyager ride, exported to the United States in 2001.
1984	1987	"Viking"	Zierer	A Zierer "Viking" (Pirate Ship ride). Previously operated at Pleasureland Southport in 1983.
1984	1985	"Octopus"	Robles Bouso Attraciones	A polyp ride, later operated at Flamingoland and Pleasure Island Family Theme Park.
c.1980	1982	"Tahiti Express"	Sobema	A superbob ride, imported from Holland. Later operated at Redcar Amusement Park.
1983	1980s	"Bobslay"	Sobema	The park's second superbob ride, operated previously at Blackpool Pleasure Beach.
1994	1994	"Top Flip"	Far Fabbri	A Top Spin ride, later operated at Fantasy Island.
2014	2015	"Star Flyer"	Funlight	A swing tower ride, now owned by Showman John Wall.
1995	1995	"Quasar"	A.R.M.	The park's second quasar ride, operated previously at Butlin's Minehead, Butlin's Pwllheli and Barry Island Pleasure Park.
1989	1989	"Quasar"	A.R.M.	The park's first quasar ride, imported from Sweden.
1976	2000	"Twist"	Walldren Engineering	A classic twist ride, replaced by a more modern version.
1977	1977	"Scat"	Fairplace	Sold to showman Bob Wilson in September 1977, later exported to Norway in 1978.
1981	1990s	"Hurricane"	Frank Hrubetz	Imported from the U.S.A.
1980	1982	"Matterhorn"	Reverchon Industries	A Matterhorn (ride), later operated at Spanish City, Whitley Bay.

== Incidents and controversies ==
Coney Beach had a reasonable record of safety between its opening in 1920 and its commercial heyday between the 1950s and 1980s, when it often attracted several thousand visitors per week in the summer months.

Since 1994, Coney Beach has been the scene of several serious and in one case fatal incidents:

- 1994 - In April, a 9-year-old boy died in an incident on the Water Chute. A gantry fell onto the track, causing several carriages to derail. It was also revealed in the aftermath that there had been an accident on this ride a year prior, where three passengers were injured when their boat left the tracks and fell nearly 6 ft; this had not been reported because it had been caused by drunken passengers deliberately shifting their weight and causing the boat to go off course.
- 1994 - In August, a 14-year-old girl fractured three ribs and injured her lungs when she was thrown 40 feet out of the newly opened Top Flip ride at the park. Three other people were injured in the incident and were treated for stomach, neck and leg injuries. The incident occurred only hours after the ride had been tested. The ride was immediately dismantled.
- 1994 - Two months after the accident on the Top Flip ride, and less than two weeks after the fatal incident on the Water Chute, the 'Blizzard' roller-coaster overshot on its exit run, injuring three passengers. Unlike the previous two incidents in 1994, this accident was caused by human error, as the ride attendant was not paying attention and forgot to apply the brakes when the ride was supposed to have stopped. The employee was dismissed. The Blizzard, in operation since the late 1980s, was eventually withdrawn in 2004 amongst reports that its speed relative to its size was causing riders to experience head shaking.
- 2000 - A 17-year-old girl suffered a fractured skull when a bolt fell out of the Skymaster ride and hit her as she walked past.
- 2002 - A suspicious fire occurred at the park.
- 2004 - A sex offender, who had been ordered to stay away from children by a court, was found to have been given a job at the park two weeks later.
- 2023 - A man suffered a spinal fracture on the Waltzer.
- 2025 - On Wednesday 13 August, a partial derailment of the Wacky Worm, an introductory roller coaster that the park said was owned by a third party, injured an adult and thirteen children.

Many visitors and critics from local and national press complained in the 2000s that the park did not properly maintain or care for its older rides, instead focusing solely on its newer additions, compromising the safety of users. Additionally, the 'Megablitz' and 'Nessi' rides were regularly reported in the local press to create very sharp impacts on the rider and to sometimes shake riders' heads excessively.
