= International WaterCentre =

Australia-based organisation

- Formation: 2005
- Purpose: Integrated Water Management
- Location: Brisbane, Australia
- Region served: Global
- CEO: Mark Pascoe
- Website: watercentre.org

The International WaterCentre (IWC) is a Brisbane-based organisation providing education, training, and applied research to develop capacity and promote whole-of-water cycle approaches to Integrated Water Management globally.

Founded in 2005 through a partnership between the Queensland State Government and four of Australia's universities, the IWC is now jointly owned by The University of Queensland (UQ) and Griffith University (GU). The International WaterCentre was also named in the opening paper of the January 2010 issue of Freshwater Biology as one of the institutions (alongside The Nature Conservancy, World Water Forum and the World Bank) whose training programs represented the "most workable approach" to "educate a new generation of water scientists and policy makers".

== History ==
Key dates of the International WaterCentre

- The International WaterCentre was established in 2005 through a joint venture of four universities: The University of Queensland, Griffith University, Monash University, and the University of Western Australia. The partners came together to focus on leadership and capacity building in the area of Integrated Water Management.
- In 2005, former Queensland Premier Peter Beattie announced a 2.4 million dollar funding boost to the organisation, declaring water management as one of the "greatest challenges of the 21st century".
- In 2008, International WaterCentre CEO Mark Pascoe was awarded the annual Medal for Management Innovation by the Australian Institute of Management.
- In 2017, International WaterCentre announced that it would become an independent entity of Griffith University.

== Activities ==
=== Education ===
The International WaterCentre provides a number of education and training programs through its member universities based in Australia and South Africa.

==== Postgraduate education ====
The International WaterCentre's flagship program is the 'Master of Integrated Water Management'. It is a co-badged and co-taught degree between The University of Queensland, Monash University, Griffith University, and The University of Western Australia. Commenting on the programs formation, Premier Beattie stated, "Not only will these courses help build local skills in water management, they will also further boost Queensland's international reputation for high quality education."

Every year the International WaterCentre awards a small number of scholarships to candidates who are accepted into the IWC 'Master of Integrated Water Management' and demonstrate potential to become leaders in water management. International students make up a large portion of the student body.

==== Training programs ====
The International WaterCentre offers a number of non-award training programs, including the IWC Water Leadership Program and tailored training programs for senior water industry professionals. One such program is the government supported Water Sensitive Cities Workshop series, which brought Australian water professionals together to discern major environmental issues and assess progress in creating water-sensitive cities around the country.

=== Research ===
Through collaboration with government and its partner universities, the International WaterCentre conducts research on water-related issues and regularly publishes to scientific journals on the subject. International WaterCentre research themes are: Integrated water management, water sensitive cities, healthy rivers and aquatic ecosystems, water, sanitation and hygiene, and policy-science integration. In 2007, the IWC established a research and education node in Johannesburg, South Africa, to focus on water challenges through collaboration with local experts. The node has three main functions,

1. Research – Examining specific issues of concern in "contemporary" Africa.
2. Education – Advanced postgraduate study on these issues.
3. Community engagement – Create a more sustainable future in water management involving the community.

==== Asia-Pacific knowledge hub ====
In 2009 the International WaterCentre was selected to join the 'Asia-Pacific Knowledge Hubs' as the Hub for Healthy Rivers and Aquatic Ecosystems. The Asia-Pacific Water Forum's "KnowledgeHubs" network is designed to improve water security in the Asia-Pacific region through the sharing of knowledge, skills and experience among recognized institutions. The hub focuses on a number of key areas including: generating best practice information on protection of rivers, providing training and postgraduate courses in integrated water management, developing river health monitoring framework and others.

=== Services ===
Since operations began in 2005, The International WaterCentre has provided services in integrated water management to governments and industry throughout Australia and internationally. Headed by the University of Queensland, the company facilitated the Queensland Water Commission's Expert Advisory Panel for purified recycled water scheme in South East Queensland, the third largest scheme of its type in the world.

== Members ==
- Griffith University

== Partners ==
- South East Queensland Healthy Waterways Partnership
- International River Foundation

== See also ==
- International Energy Centre
