= Independent Water Commission =

Independent review of the water industry in England and Wales

- Date: 23 October 2024 – 21 July 2025
- Chair: Sir Jon Cunliffe

The Independent Water Commission (Welsh: Comisiwn Dŵr Annibynnol) was a British government review of the regulatory system for the water sector in the United Kingdom. It was chaired by Sir Jon Cunliffe.

== Establishment ==
The UK Government and the Welsh Government established the Independent Water Commission in October 2024.

== Final report ==
=== Contents ===
The report recommended:

- establishing an obligation to have smart meters
- merging Ofwat, the Drinking Water Inspectorate, water-environment related functions of the Environment Agency and Natural England
- transferring the economic responsibilities of Ofwat in Wales to Natural Resources Wales
- establishing an ombudsman for Water, comparable to the Energy Ombudsman
- the establishment of 8 regional new regional water system planning authorities in England, one for each river basin
- the establishment of a national water system planning authority for Wales
- the publication of a national water strategy by both the UK Government and the Welsh Government

== Reception ==
The recommendations were supported by Deputy First Minister of Wales and Cabinet Secretary for Climate Change and Rural Affairs, Huw Irranca-Davies.
