= Sunshine Gardens =

Sunshine Gardens may refer to:

- A suburb of Orlando, Florida, United States
- Former name of H.V. McKay Memorial Gardens in Sunshine, Victoria, Australia
- A neighborhood in Fredericton, New Brunswick, Canada
- A neighborhood area in Indianapolis, Indiana, United States
- A residential subdivision in South San Francisco, California, United States
