= Sunshine Technical College =

Heritage-listed former school in Melbourne, Victoria, Australia

Sunshine Technical College (former)

Location
- 111 and 129–133 Derby Road, Sunshine, City of Brimbank, Melbourne, Victoria; Australia; 37°47′25″S 144°49′44″E

Information
- Former names: Sunshine Technical Girls' School; Sunshine Technical School
- Type: Public secondary school and technical college (former)
- Motto: Latin: Mente et manibus (With mind and with hands)
- Established: 7 July 1913; 113 years ago; 10 October 1940 (girls' school)
- Founders: Department of Education; Hugh Victor McKay
- Closed: 1991 (repurposed in 1992)
- Authority: Department of Education
- Campus type: Suburban

History
- Built: 1913; 1938–1947; 1963; 1980s

Site notes
- Material: Timber; galvanised iron (1909); Bricks; glass (1938– )
- Area: 1.8 ha (4.5 acres) (2016)
- Architect: Percy Everett
- Architectural styles: Inter-war Moderne (1940); Brutalist (1980s)

Victorian Heritage Register
- Official name: Former Sunshine Technical College
- Type: Registered place
- Criteria: a., d.
- Designated: 6 February 2025
- Reference no.: H2458
- Category: Education

The Sunshine Technical College, sometimes called the Sunshine Technical School and part of which was called the Sunshine Technical Girls' School, is a former public secondary school and technical college located at 111 and 129–133 Derby Road, in Sunshine, in the City of Brimbank, in the western suburbs of Melbourne, in Victoria, Australia. The former college was established in 1913 and operated until 1991 on the traditional lands of the Wurundjeri people. Between 1992 and 2020, the site was part of the newly established Sunshine College.

Included at the site of the former college are the Nash Block, or former Sunshine Technical Girls' School, constructed from 1938, and the Henty Wing, or the former Technical School, constructed in two stages between 1941 and 1947, both designed by Percy Everett. These buildings were added to the Victorian Heritage Register on 6 February 2025 in recognition of its historical and representative significance; and was also added to a non-statutory list by the City of Brimbank.

== History ==
=== Technical schools and colleges ===
Technical schools were designed to equip students with the skills needed to work at a manual trade. Common classes included woodwork and joinery, plumbing, metalwork, and later electronics, radio communications, and motor mechanics. For women and girls, some technical schools offered classes in needlework, dressmaking, millinery, and cookery. Early technical education in Victoria was haphazard and did not have a central organisation. The first structured technical schools were the Schools of Mines in Ballarat (1870) and Bendigo (1873); and the Industrial and Technological Museum (1873), with evening classes in a range of practical maths and science subjects. Technical subjects were also taught at mechanics' institutes and schools of art and design from 1873. These were the precursors to the more generalist technical schools. Early technical college included the Melbourne Working Men's College, the Gordon Institute of Technology, both established in 1887, and the Horsham Working Men's College (1890). However, these schools, as well as schools of mines and art and design, continued to be hampered by lack of government funding and central organisation.

The Victorian Royal Commission on Technical Education was held from 1899 to 1901 and examined Victoria's ten schools of mines, five schools of arts, and three technical colleges, and recommended that technical education be improved and expanded. The Royal Commission resulted in the Education Act (Vic.), 1910, and a complete reorganisation of state secondary education. Under this Act, the Victorian Government created junior technical schools, providing government-funded secondary school technical education for the first time. The Education Department also established senior technical colleges, which would cater to adults and apprentices. The Sunshine Technical College opened in 1913 and was one of the first three schools established after the Act passed Parliament. It had both junior (secondary) and senior (tertiary) classes on campus.

In Melbourne, technical schools became common in the industrial suburbs of the northern and western suburbs. Until 1943 the only technical school in the eastern suburbs was the Eastern Suburbs Technical School in Hawthorn (1908). During World War II, technical schools played a critical role in defence training, and in re-training military personnel. By 1945 there were 32 technical schools and 28 junior technical schools. In 1965 there were 52 technical schools in Melbourne and its surrounding suburbs and 33 in regional Victoria, with one high school also offering a technical section. Today, technical schools have been largely subsumed by the TAFE systems, or into regional university campuses.

=== Sunshine Technical College ===
The Sunshine Technical College was the longest running junior technical school in Victoria, operating from 1913 to 1991. It also operated as a campus for a senior technical school. It was one of the first three technical schools created after the Education Act 1910, and thus one of the first run by the Education Department; the other two were West Melbourne Junior Technical School (1912) and Collingwood Technical School (1912).

==== Association with H. V. McKay and Sunshine Harvester Works ====
Hugh Victor McKay (1865–1926) was the primary benefactor of Sunshine Technical College. McKay made his fortune through his design, patent, and manufacture of the Sunshine Harvester via his eponymous company and the Sunshine Harvester Works, founded in Ballarat in 1889. In 1904, McKay purchased the Braybrook Implement Company works in Braybrook Junction – renamed as Sunshine in 1907 – and transferred his operations to this site, completing the move in 1907. The factory expanded to become one of the largest and most active industrial plants in Australia, producing a wide range of agricultural implements. McKay introduced labour-saving machine tools, the piecework system and time and motion studies, making the Sunshine Harvester Works one of the few Australian manufacturers to employ mass production methods.

McKay wanted a technical school in Sunshine to ensure skilled workers for his factory. To help establishSunshine Technical Girls' School the college, McKay offered A£2,000 and 1.8 hectares (4.5 acres) of his Sunshine estate, and provided his apprentices with a half-day break from employment every week to attend classes – a unique and innovative decision. At opening in 1913, George Baxter was appointed principal with assistant teachers, A. J. Dunlop, W. W. Anderson, and H. B. Ernes. Seventy students were enrolled in the first year of which 44 were apprentices employed at Sunshine Harvester Works. McKay's investment in Sunshine Technical College was part of his desire to create a model working class community as part of a company town.

McKay subdivided much of the land surrounding his factories and donated it for the construction of housing and public amenities for his workers. As well as giving land and money for Sunshine Technical College, McKay funded gardens and a church, the railway station and hospital, as well as electric lighting and windbreaks.

McKay remained president of the Sunshine Technical School Council until his death in 1926. After his death, members of his family and senior staff of Sunshine Harvester Works continued to sit on the School Council. In 1930, Sunshine Harvester Works merged with Massey Harris, weakening the ties between the company and Sunshine Technical College. In 1953, Massey-Harris amalgamated with the eponymous British tractor firm of Harry Ferguson. The McKay family interest was sold in 1955 to the newly-formed multinational agricultural implement conglomerate Massey-Harris Ferguson, later rebranded as Massey Ferguson. From the 1970s, when many Australian-based manufacturing industries were experiencing financial difficulties, the operations of the company, in Sunshine, progressively contracted from between 1971 and 1986, when the factory site was sold.

As a consequence, there was significantly less demand for technical and trades education in Sunshine. The department closed the technical college in 1991 and repurposed the site as a campus for the newly established Sunshine College, for study of the Victorian Certificate of Education. However, by 2020, the Sunshine College was relocated to a new campus.

== Description ==
=== Buildings at Sunshine Technical College ===
The first buildings at Sunshine Technical College were a wooden administration building and large iron workshop. In 1915 the science lab was partitioned to accommodate female students, who were to learn shorthand, typewriting and bookkeeping. In 1921 the Sunshine Girls' Technical College was officially established, with its own headmistress. It was the first dedicated girls' technical school in Victoria.

A purpose-made girls' school building was officially opened in 1940 and was named the Nash Block, in honour of the first headmistress of Sunshine Girls' Technical School. The building was designed in the Inter-war Moderne style by chief architect of the Public Works Department, Percy Everett. Everett was instrumental in promoting Moderne architecture in public buildings and he was a product of technical schools, receiving his education at Gordon Technical College and taking on the role of headmaster at Brunswick Technical School and Brighton Technical School. He considered the Moderne style suitable for technical schools in particular, as a modern and state-of-the-art expression. Everett undertook extensive planning for schools, and introduced entirely new types of technical, high, consolidated and elementary schools. His work was highly influential, and other Australian states adopted his planning and designs.

In 1941 a new brick workshop was opened at the corner of Derby Road and Graham Street. Funded by the Department of Defence, the building was part of the Commonwealth Defence Technical Training Scheme. Men and women would be trained to work at the munitions and explosives factories in the district. In 1945 the Public Works Department granted a tender to construct additions to the 1941 workshop. The Percy Everett design remodelled and extended the workshop, adding a second floor and curved stairwell in a Moderne design. The resulting building, named the Henty Boys’ Trade Block, was completed in 1947.

An auditorium was opened on site in 1963, funded by the Education Department and parents and friends of Sunshine Technical College. In the 1980s, the 1913 building was demolished to make way for a three-storey Brutalist building, known as the Beavan Wing. The original 1913 workshops were also demolished to accommodate the brutalist Ferguson Wing.

== Educational innovations ==
The Sunshine Technical College opened in 1913 with facilities for both a junior (secondary school) for working-class boys and senior (technical college) classes for apprentices. At opening, over half of these apprentices worked at the Sunshine Harvester Works factory. The junior division was particularly significant, as Sunshine Technical College was one of the first government-controlled junior technical schools in Victoria.

The Sunshine Technical College was the first technical school in Victoria where an employer allowed their apprentices half a day to attend classes. H. V. McKay made this promise in 1911, when he offered the Education Department land and money to set up a technical school in Sunshine. This arrangement was unique and highly influential, and the model spread to the entire state in 1928, under the Victorian Apprenticeship Commission. In 1917 the school introduced a vocational retraining scheme, to re-skill repatriated servicemen from World War I. This became the model for the scheme operated by the Commonwealth Rehabilitation Commission between 1918 and 1923.

The girls' school was the first dedicated girls' technical school in Victoria. As early as 1915 Sunshine Technical College was offering education for girls and women, with typewriting, shorthand, and bookkeeping classes. A girls' school was formally established in 1921, with its own headmistress. When the Emily McPherson College of Domestic Economy opened in 1927, the Sunshine Girls' Technical School became a feeder school.

== See also ==
- Architecture of Melbourne
- Education in Australia
- List of places on the Victorian Heritage Register in the City of Brimbank
- Technical and further education
