= List of places on the Victorian Heritage Register in the City of Brimbank =

This is a list of places on the Victorian Heritage Register in the City of Brimbank in Victoria, Australia. The Victorian Heritage Register is maintained by the Heritage Council of Victoria.

As of September 2026, the Victorian Heritage Register listed the following fourteen state-registered places within the City of Brimbank:

| Place name | Place # | Location | Suburb or Town | Coordinates | Built | State registered | Photo |
|---|---|---|---|---|---|---|---|
| Albion Viaduct (Note: Also included on the VHR for the City of Moonee Valley.) | H1197 | over the Maribyrnong River | Keilor East and; Sunshine North | 37°44′49″S 144°50′47″E | 1929 | 19 September 1996 | |
| Arundel Road Trestle Bridge (Note: Also included on the VHR for the City of Hume.) | H1952 | over the Maribyrnong River | Keilor and; Tullamarine | 37°42′14″S 144°49′58″E | 1907 | 13 September 2001 | |
| Black Powder Mill | H2029 | Parklea Ave and Grassy Point Rd | Cairnlea | 37°45′49″S 144°46′41″E | 1942 | 12 June 2003 | |
| H. V. McKay Memorial Gardens and Church | H1953 | 118–122 Anderson Rd | Sunshine | 37°47′01″S 144°49′42″E | 1909 | 13 September 2001 | |
| H. V. McKay offices | H1966 | 2 Devonshire Rd | Sunshine | 37°47′06″S 144°49′51″E | 1909 | 21 March 2002 | |
| Iron Bridge | H1427 | over Maribyrnong River | Keilor and; Keilor East | 37°43′26″S 144°50′26″E | 1868 | 20 August 1982 | |
| John Darling and Son Flour Mill | H0829 | 74 Sydney St | Albion | 37°46′40″S 144°49′25″E | 1922 | 23 January 1991 | |
| Keilor Hotel | H1974 | 670–674 Old Calder Hwy | Keilor | 37°43′11″S 144°50′11″E | 1848 | 14 February 2002 | |
| Main Outfall Sewer (former) (Note: Also included on the VHR for the cities of Hobsons Bay and Wyndham.) | H1932 | Cypress Ave | Brooklyn | 37°49′18″S 144°50′33″E | 1894 | 13 September 2001 | |
| Massey Ferguson complex (former) | H0667 | Devonshire Rd, Hampshire Rd and Harvester Rd | Sunshine | 37°46′55″S 144°49′52″E | 1907– | 7 February 2008 | |
| Overnewton homestead and gatehouse | H0200 | 51 Overnewton Rd | Keilor | 37°42′18″S 144°49′12″E | 1849 | 9 October 1974 | |
| Overnewton homestead and gatehouse | H1947 | 804–804A Old Calder Hwy | Keilor | 37°42′18″S 144°49′12″E | c. 1859 | 12 July 2001 | |
| Prefabricated building (former Police Hut) | H1971 | 152 Harrick Rd | Keilor Park | 37°43′14″S 144°50′48″E | c. 1850s | 14 February 2002 | |
| Sunshine Technical College (former) | H2458 | 111 and 129–133 Derby Rd | Sunshine | 37°47′25″S 144°49′44″E | 1938 | 6 February 2025 | |
