= Kitchen garden =

Garden area used for growing edible plants

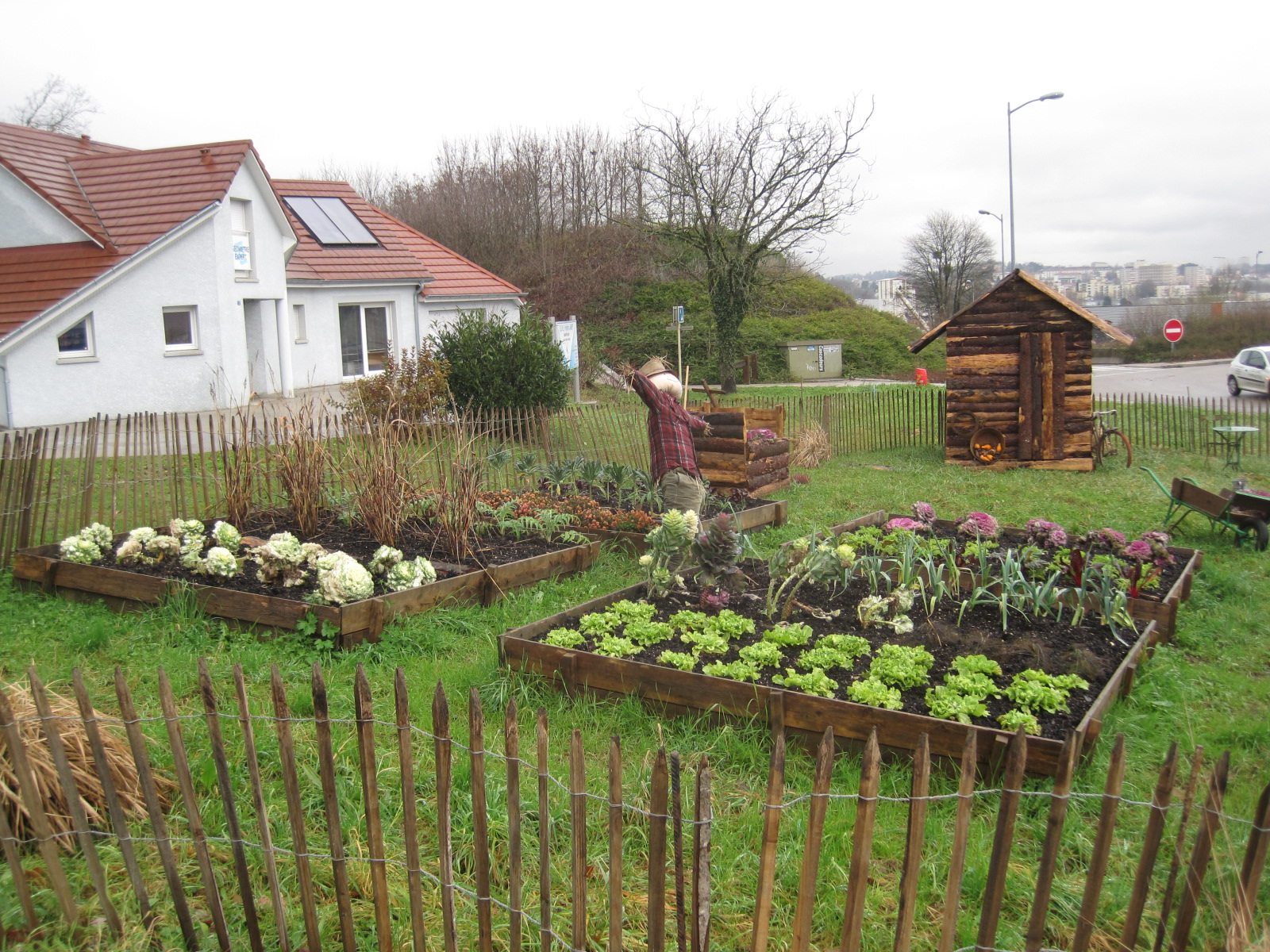
Typical potager (French intensive gardening) with its traditional scarecrow in the French countryside

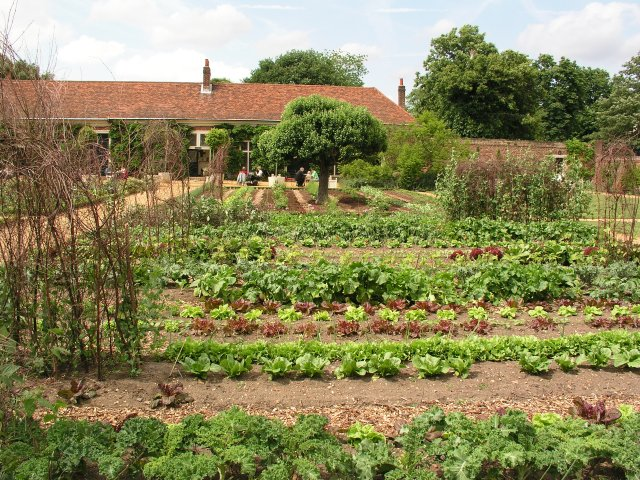
Walled 17th-century kitchen garden at Ham House near London, with orangery in the distance.

The traditional kitchen garden, vegetable garden, also known as a potager (from the French jardin potager) or in Scotland a kailyaird, is a space separate from the rest of the residential garden – the ornamental plants and lawn areas – used for growing edible plants, especially historically. In large country houses, the kitchen garden was a segregated area, normally rectangular and enclosed by a wall or hedge.

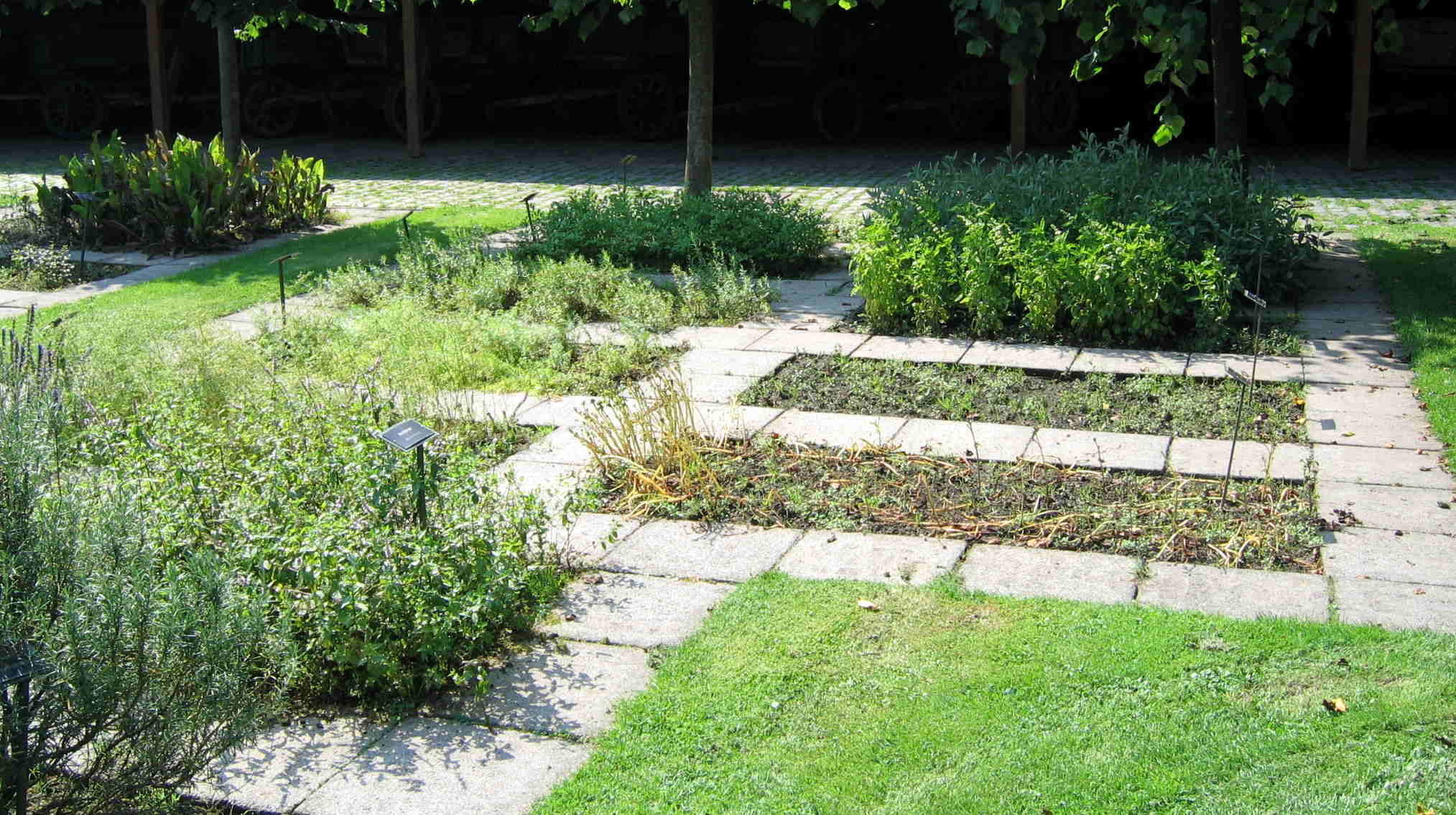
An herbal garden at Beernem, Belgium

Domestic vegetable gardens provide a small-scale source of food. These were common during the world wars and have been grown to pursue sustainability. Herbs are also produced to flavour dishes and for medicinal purposes.

== Form ==
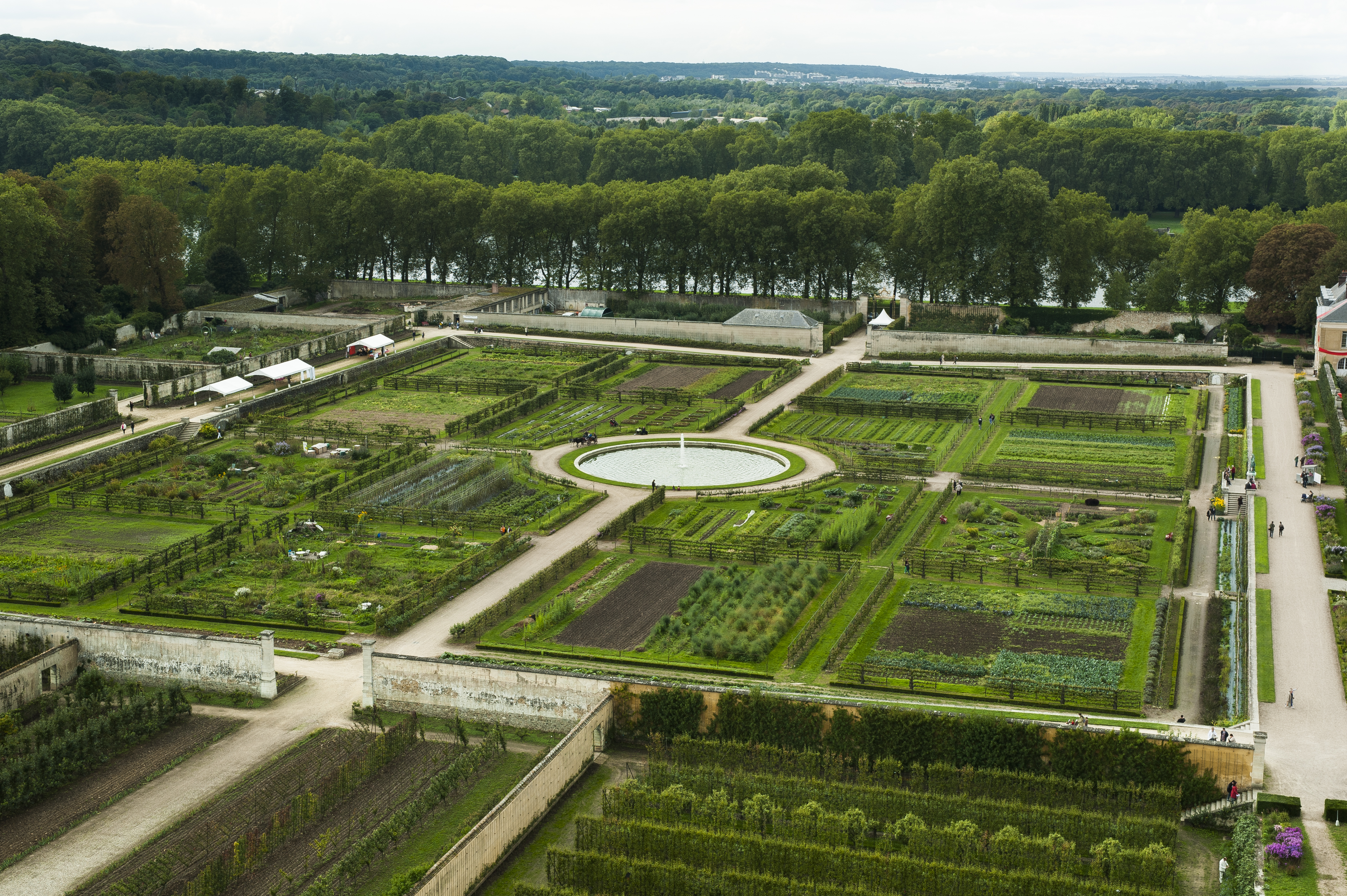
Part of the potager du roi at Versailles, with steps for mounting the wall at bottom right

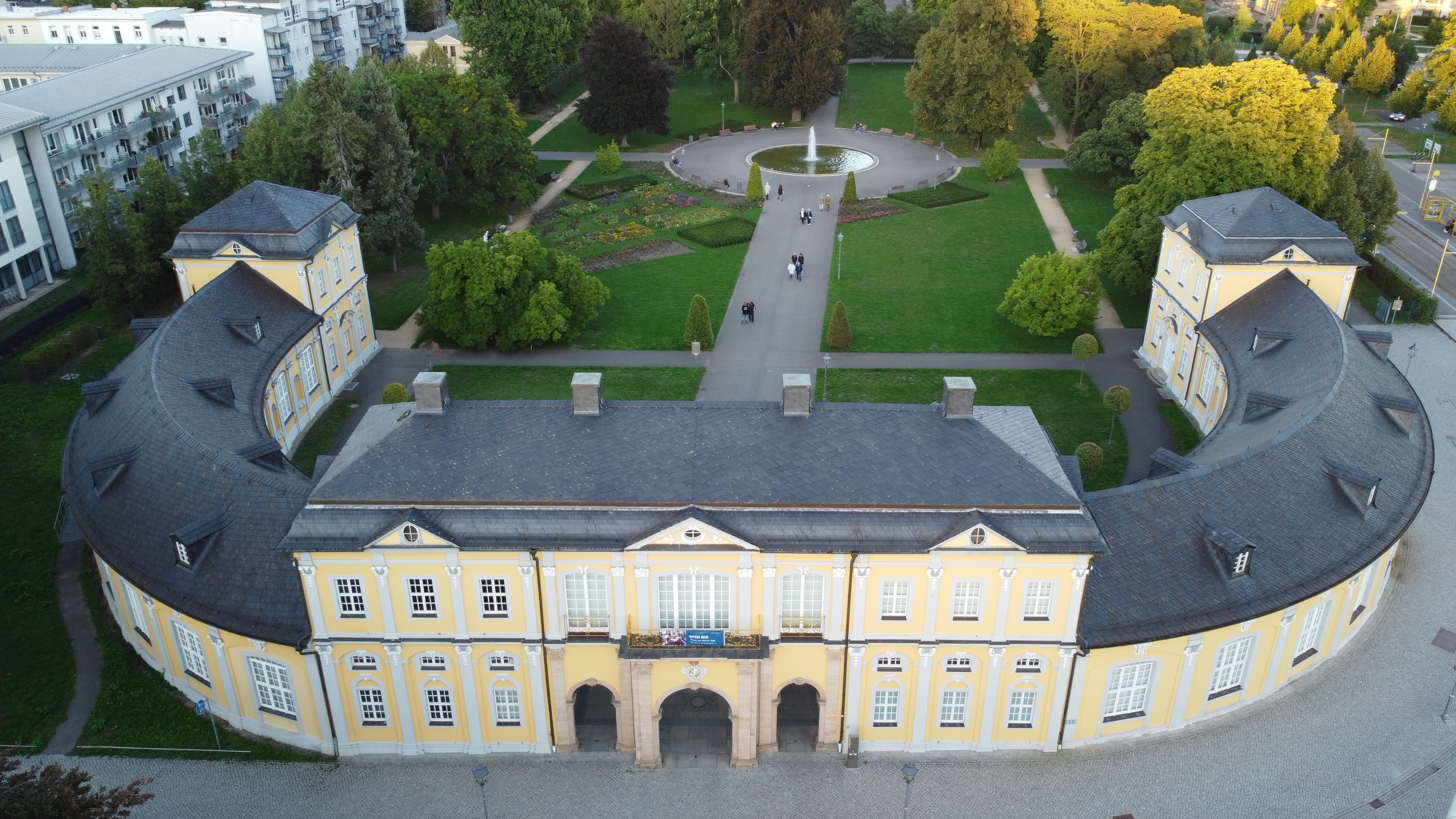
In Gera, a baroque orangery forms the western end of the Küchengarten (kitchen garden), which is the local pleasure garden.

In large country house gardens, walls served to hide the kitchen garden, as "a place of base labour ... from the more polite areas", which included the often very extensive fruit gardens and orchards. The gardeners were often, depending on the season, the number of guests, and the whim of the owner, expected to keep out of the main "best garden" during the fairly predictable parts of the day when the family and guests were likely to be walking in the garden, and the kitchen garden provided somewhere for them to occupy themselves at these times. Mostly, visitors were probably not expected to venture inside without leave. But some owners, from Louis XIV downwards, liked to show guests the kitchen garden, especially if they knew they had an interest. In the gardens of Versailles, the enormous potager area, not contiguous with the main gardens, had a wall that was thick enough for visitors to accompany the king in walking along the top for a better view, as on castle battlements.

Walled gardens may also be useful to train fruit trees and offer shelter from wind. Large examples very often included greenhouses and furnace-heated hothouses for more tender delicacies, and also flowers for display in the house; an orangery was the ultimate type.

In large houses, the kitchen garden was typically placed diagonally to the rear and side of the house, not impeding the views from the front and rear facades, but still quick to access. In some cases, hardy flowers for cutting were grown outside there, rather than in the flower garden. A large country house hardly expected to buy any vegetables, herbs or fruit, and the surplus was often distributed as presents; the walled example at Croome Court in England covers seven acres, and the gardens have a large "Temple Greenhouse", an orangery in the form of a Roman Temple.

A kitchen garden differs from an allotment in that a kitchen garden is on private land attached or very close to the dwelling. It is regarded as essential that the kitchen garden could be quickly accessed by the cook.

== History ==
The French doctor and printer, Charles Estienne, wrote in detail about the 16th-century kitchen garden in Maison Rustique; his book was largely compiled from classical authors. This practical garden was to be separated from the pleasure gardens, enclosed by a thick hedge or wall. Estienne viewed hedges as more resilient, cost effective and were easier to repair and maintain, but at least in later periods, walls seem to have been more usual; some were hot walls, with a central cavity gently heated by furnaces. Certainly walls leave more traces behind for the garden archaeologist. The hedge, Estienne says, can be planted with red and white gooseberry bushes, medlar and olive trees, woodbine, whitethorn, wild apples, brambles, and eglantiness. Lattices were woven from willow branches and every year renewed, unless made with juniper poles that had been reinforced with charred oak.

In the Middle Ages, the kitchen garden was often a separate enclosure some way away from the main house. The Covent Garden area of London got its name as the kitchen garden for Westminster Abbey, though some distance from the abbey itself. In Renaissance times, the kitchen garden was rather close to the house, but by the mid-17th-century many were being moved further away, with a service road leading to the main house. At Versailles a public road needs to be crossed to reach it.

By the 19th century in the United Kingdom, as the breeding of vegetable cultivars greatly increased, many magazines, societies, and local/county fair competitions supported what had become (and remains) a popular form of specialist gardening. Some gardeners concentrated on mere size, leading to monstrous (and largely tasteless) strains of vegetables such as leeks. The new allotments, small pieces of a plot of land made available by local councils or charities, often specified that only edible plants were to be grown.

In the early 20th century, the city government of Poznań purchased several small plots of land that it then distributed to families with children. The families cultivated the land with seeds and fertilizer. Crops included carrots, spinach, and beans. The city government found that the plots complemented the diets of the families and looked to expand the program. Some families also grew enough to sell.

== Plants ==
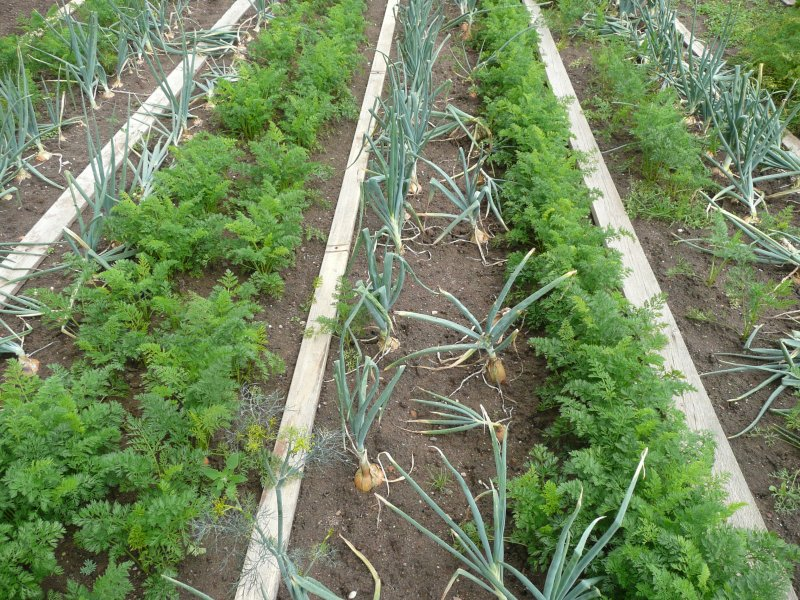
Companion planting of carrots and onions

According to Estienne, of the planted crops, turnips required the most room, and planted next to these were coleworts, and a path leading to plots of sorrel, arugula, parsley, spinach, beets, and orach, then separated from the greens another path to the root vegetables, leeks, onions, garlic, carrots, and scallions, and so on for edible flowers and winter potherbs like thyme, sage, lavender, rosemary, hyssop, southern wormwood, savoury, lemon balm, basil, costmary, spikenard, chamomile, and pennyroyal.

Marigolds could grow perennially in untilled fields, and their juice and flowers were reputed to have many benefits from soothing eye irritation to relieving tooth pain. Strawberry juice and wine were rumored to have similar benefits for the eyes, and, according to Estienne, the berries themselves had "no neede of greate toile or tilling". Modern researchers continue to study whether reduced tillage improves weed control and yield for strawberry plants.

Other plants found in the kitchen garden: asparagus, artichoke, sow thistle, endive, chicory, watercress, scallions, chives, parsnips, purslane, smallage, tarragon, borage, bugloss, radishes, rapeseed, skirret, poppy, mustard, cucumbers and gourds.

Citrus and melons could be part of the kitchen garden also, if the conditions of soil and climate were such as to support their growth.

=== Modern potager garden ===
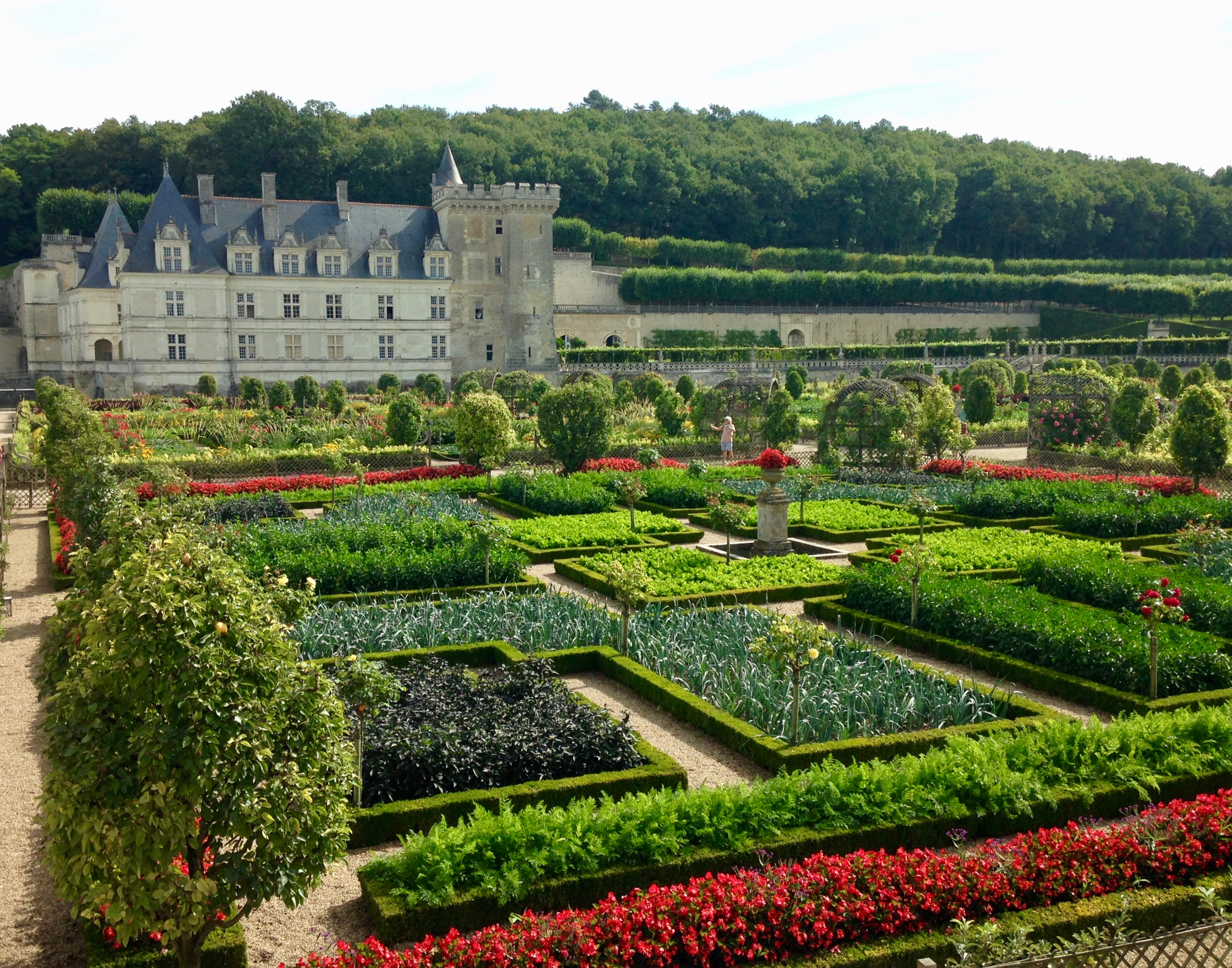
At the Château de Villandry, France, the old formal flower beds have been turned over in recent decades entirely to vegetables, giving a striking, if untypical, scene.

In some modern gardens, edible plants and especially herbs are planted alongside ornamental plants. Fruit trees are one of the most common ways of doing this. The goal is to make the function of providing food aesthetically pleasing.

Plants are chosen for their functionality, colour and form. Many are trained to grow upward. A well-designed potager can provide food, as well as cut-flowers and herbs, for the home with very little maintenance. Potagers can disguise their function of providing for a home in a variety of forms: from the cottage garden to the knot garden.

The owner of one of the Loire chateaux in France, the Château de Villandry decided many decades ago, to recreate a French formal garden with an elaborate geometrical scheme of beds surrounded by low hedges, but planted with kitchen garden plants (more recently the garden has been extended, the new areas mostly not planted with vegetables). This striking scheme has been highly effective in turning the gardens into a tourist attraction, but is in no way historically authentic.

== Vegetable garden ==
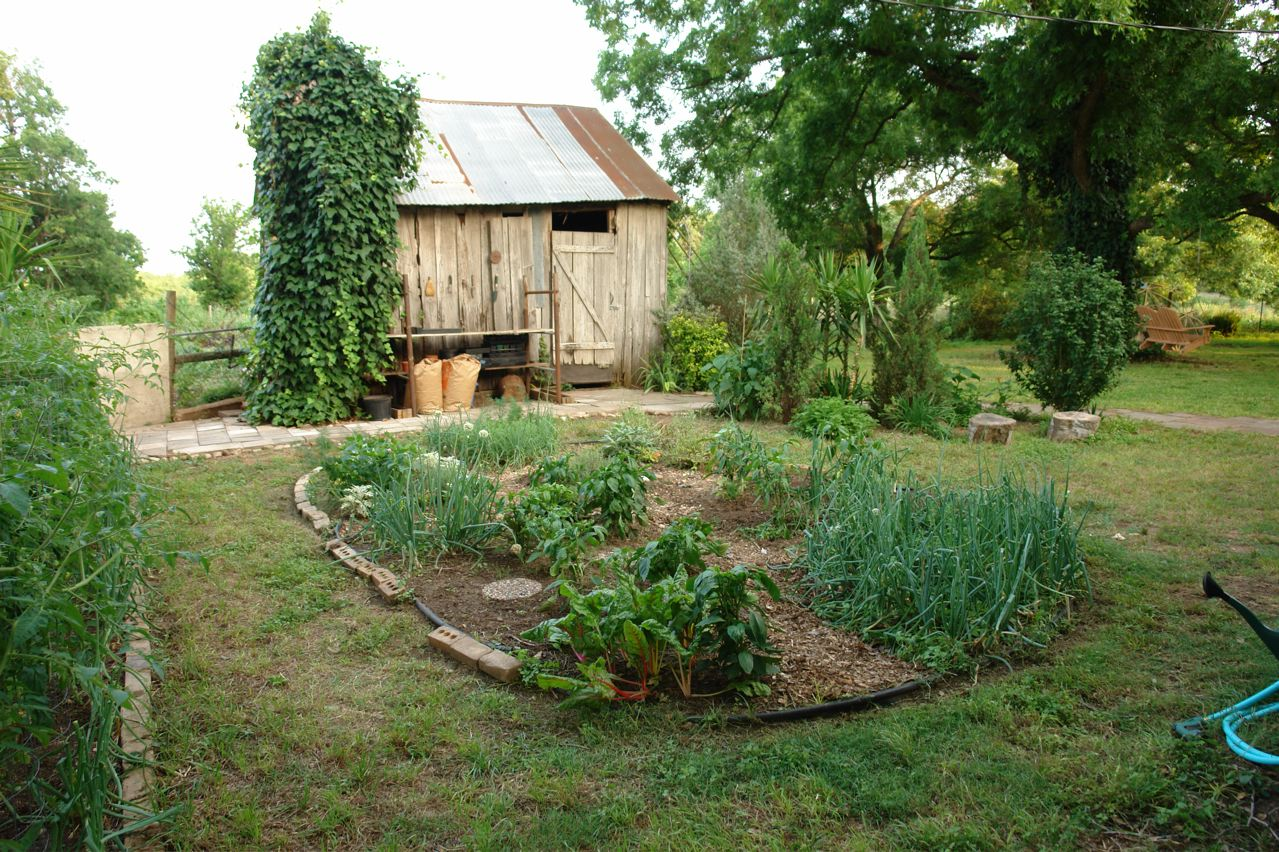
A small vegetable garden in May outside Austin, Texas

A vegetable garden (also known as a vegetable patch or vegetable plot) is a garden for growing vegetables for personal use or dissemination, in contrast to a larger-scale market garden or farm. The garden is typically divided into plots or raised beds for rows of various plants and may utilize compost. Planting and harvest times vary based on hardiness zone (spring to summer in cooler regions, and both fall and late winter in hotter ones). Yields include beans, beets, broccoli, brussels sprouts, cabbage, carrots, cauliflower, corn, cucumbers, kale, lettuce, onions, peas, peppers, spinach, squashes, and tomatoes.

A symbol of American self-sufficiency and the colonial homestead, practical kitchen gardens were central to home life in early America. During the world wars, many people grew a "victory garden" to provide food, freeing resources for the war effort. About a third of adults in the UK and United States grow food in private or community kitchen or vegetable gardens. With an increased interest in organic and sustainable living, many people have turned to gardening to supplement their family's diet. Producing food domestically is regarded as resolving associated ethical problems, such as greenhouse gas emissions (including fuel consumption) (Note: Growing food locally reduces food miles, the distance food travels, and therefore reduces the greenhouse gas emissions associated with that travel.) and unfair labor.

Additionally, there has been interest in integrating the growing of food plants within a mainly ornamental garden; fruit trees and cooking herbs are the simplest and most popular expression of this. A 2019 study on social contagion found evidence that the spread of vegetable gardens in urban spaces was the result of neighbors seeing gardens near them and deciding to grow their own.

== Herb garden ==
The herb garden is often a separate space in the garden, devoted to growing a specific group of plants known as herbs. These gardens may be informal patches of plants, or they may be carefully designed, even to the point of arranging and clipping the plants to form specific patterns, as in a knot garden.

Herb gardens may be purely functional or they may include a blend of functional and ornamental plants. The herbs are usually used to flavour food in cooking, though they may also be used in other ways, such as discouraging pests, providing pleasant scents, or serving medicinal purposes (such as a physic garden), among others.

A kitchen garden can be created by planting different herbs in pots or containers, with the added benefit of mobility. Although not all herbs thrive in pots or containers, some herbs do better than others. Mint, a fragrant yet invasive herb, is an example of an herb that is advisable to keep in a container or it will take over the whole garden.

== Some surviving walled kitchen gardens ==
These are open to the public.

- Croome Court
- Gibside, NT, some now used as volunteer allotments
- Ham House, NT, mostly used for vegetables.
- Clumber Park

== See also ==
- List of garden types
- The Victorian Kitchen Garden, tv series
- Subsistence agriculture
