= H. V. McKay offices =

Heritage-listed commercial building in Melbourne, Victoria, Australia

- Location of the offices in Greater Metropolitan Melbourne

General information
- Status: Completed
- Type: Commercial office buildings
- Architectural style: Edwardian Baroque / Federation Arts and Crafts (1909); Rusticated Classical / Inter-war Moderne (1926)
- Location: 2 Devonshire Road, Sunshine, City of Brimbank, Melbourne, Victoria, Australia
- Coordinates: 37°47′06″S 144°49′51″E
- Year built: 1909–1926
- Completed: 1909; 117 years ago (first structure); 1926 (second structure)
- Renovated: 1926; 1940

Technical details
- Material: Masonry; timber (1909); Bricks; stucco; Marseille tiles (1926)

Design and construction
- Architect: J. Raymond Robinson (1926)

Renovating team
- Architect: Frederick Morsby (1940)

Victorian Heritage Register
- Official name: H. V. McKay offices
- Type: Registered place; Registered object integral to a registered place
- Designated: 21 March 2002
- Reference no.: H1966
- Heritage overlay no.: HO11
- Category: Commercial

Register of the National Estate
- Official name: H V McKay Offices (former)
- Type: Defunct register
- Designated: undated
- Reference no.: 103723

The H. V. McKay offices are two commercial office buildings located at 2 Devonshire Road in Sunshine, in the City of Brimbank, in the western suburbs of Melbourne, in Victoria, Australia.

Founded by Australian industrialist, Hugh Victor McKay for his Sunshine Harvester operations, the office buildings became the most public face of the eponymous firm and the later companies in what became a company town. The buildings are one of the very few surviving elements of the McKay–Massey Ferguson factory complex, which was one of Australia's largest and most active industrial plants and employers of labour, and which made a major contribution to community life in Melbourne's western suburbs. The complex comprises two buildings, one completed in 1909, superseded by new office buildings completed in 1926, and refurbished in 1940. The Massey Ferguson company exited the site from the 1970s and the offices were sold in c. 1986.

Built from 1909 to 1926 on the traditional lands of the Wurundjeri people, the building were added to the Victorian Heritage Register on 21 March 2002 in recognition of its historical and architectural significance; and was also added to non-statutory lists by the Victorian branch of the National Trust on 2 February 1987 and the now defunct Register of the National Estate on an unknown date.

== History ==
=== H. V. McKay and Sunshine Harvester ===
Hugh Victor McKay CBE, more commonly known as H. V. McKay, was an Australian industrialist who is known for heading the company that developed the Sunshine Harvester, arguably the first commercially viable combine harvester. He subsequently established the Sunshine Harvester Works, which became one of Australia's largest manufacturers of agricultural equipment, located in Sunshine, in what is today's Melbourne western suburbs. McKay is also renown for his connection with the Harvester Judgement that, on appeal in 1907, became the basis of the basic wage, that dominated economic and industrial relations in Australia until the 1980s.

=== Office building ===
In 1904, H. V. McKay purchased the Braybrook Implement Company works, on a 160-hectare (400-acre) site (Note: One source stated that McKay initially acquired 6.5 ha (16 acres) by tender; and then purchased a further 112 ha (276 acres) of farm land, in order to build the factory and associated structures.) at the junction of the northern and western rail routes. He began to transfer his operations there from Ballarat in 1905 and completed the move in 1907, by which time the operations of the business had trebled in size. Initially named after the railway junction, the town was renamed Sunshine in 1907, following community feedback. At first, the office of the company was in the buildings on the north side of Devonshire Road.

The new office building on the triangular block to the south of Devonshire Road was constructed facing the railway line in 1909, and the area around this corner became the site of all of the later head office activity for the company. The general pattern of factory building expansion was to the north. Timber-framed buildings of similar scale and style to the 1909 office were constructed on either side between 1910 and 1911. The area just to the east was occupied by factory-roofed spaces for spare parts and engineering. New factory offices, show rooms, and a clocktower were opened on the north side of Devonshire Road in 1921.

By 1926, the year H. V. McKay died, the factory occupied 32 hectares (80 acres). (Note: One source stated that the factory grew to cover 12 ha (30 acres).) Another head office building on the corner was then being designed, and was completed in the same year. The 1909 office became the printing area, where company publications were produced. The 1926 offices became the focus for the numerous important visitors to the factory, who were commonly photographed outside the main doors. Tour groups were photographed with the corner of the building as a backdrop, and the offices were also a regular backdrop for photos of the various new models of machinery.

In 1928, McKay's original timber-slab farm smithy was relocated on the strip of garden facing the railway line.

In 1930, H. V. McKay, the eponymous firm – Australia's biggest manufacturer of farm machinery – merged with Massey Harris, the largest farm implement makers in Canada, and major international exporters. Members of the McKay family were directors of the merged entity and retained their interests. In 1940 the engineering section and the garage buildings behind were revamped to a design by Frederick Morsby. The engineering department drawing section was accommodated in a two-storey continuation of the east wing of the 1926 building, though with some additional Moderne styling on the section over the vehicular entrance to the courtyard behind the offices. The tall new garage facade to the railway frontage was given similarly derivative detailing.

Massey-Harris amalgamated with Harry Ferguson, another eponymous firm, in 1953, and the McKay family interest was bought out by this company in 1955. The Sunshine factory became a part of the international company Massey-Harris Ferguson. This takeover had a major impact on the McKay family and their staff. The timberwork and furniture of the office building, which was now no longer the head office of the company, was painted over in the grey colours of Massey Ferguson. The main centre of tractor and self-propelled harvester production was concentrated in England, and Sunshine become the second largest plant in the company's network.

A new administration building with clock tower was constructed across Devonshire Road in 1956. The operation of the works was greatly scaled down in 1971, and much of the factory site was sold in 1986.

== Description ==
The 1909 office building was of single-storey masonry construction, completed in a mix of Edwardian Baroque and Federation Arts and Crafts styles by an unknown architect. This building ceased to function as the head ofices from 1927; and little original internal fabric remains. Of the external fabric, some elements were removed including the awnings, domed roof, and finial.

The 1926 office building was designed in a rusticated classical style with Inter-war Moderne elements, by architect J. Raymond Robinson, who also undertook housing designs in Sunshine. This two-storey stuccoed masonry building has a gabled Marseille-tiled roof with narrow eaves. The straight sections of facade to Devonshire Road and Harvester Road are flanked by stuccoed bays with pilasters and pediment continued above eaves height to form panels that once carried the McKay company name. The corner is turned by three window bays separated by wide rusticated pilasters. Massive rusticated voussoirs jut out over the first floor corner windows. The awning over the main entrance on Devonshire Street was finished with decorative elements in keeping with the facade. The entrance hall is gained by a narrow and deeply inset timber panelled revolving door, which leads to a two-storey space with surrounding timber-panelled staircase. At the first floor level, the corner section of the building contains executive offices and the timber-panelled boardroom with its commanding view over the factory and railway lines and sidings.

The office building entrance faces the gates which once opened onto Russell Street, and now forms part of a precinct of structures relating to the various aspects and phases of the McKay enterprise, including the Russell Street gates, the 1956 clock tower, the railway footbridge, and the H. V. McKay Memorial Gardens and Sunshine Presbyterian Church, the latter two funded by H. V. McKay.

== See also ==
- Architecture of Melbourne
- List of places on the Victorian Heritage Register in the City of Brimbank
