= Drummartin =

- Suburb
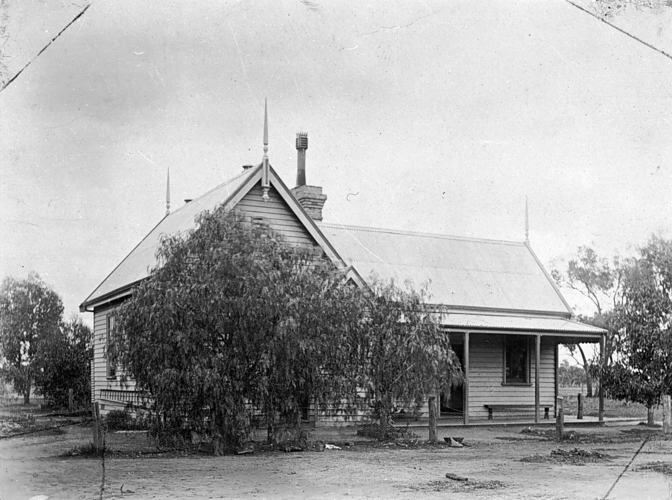
- Drummartin State School, 1905

- Interactive map of Drummartin
- Coordinates: 36°26′36″S 144°25′49″E
- Country: Australia
- State: Victoria
- City: Bendigo
- LGA: City of Greater Bendigo
- Location: 185 km (115 mi) N of Melbourne; 29 km (18 mi) N of Bendigo

Government
  - State electorate: Bendigo East
  - Federal division: Bendigo
- Elevation: 119 m (390 ft)

Population
  - Total: 42 (SAL 2021)
- Postcode: 3570

Drummartin is a locality in the City of Greater Bendigo, located between Elmore and Raywood. At the 2021 census, Drummartin had a population of 42.

== History ==
Drummartin is the birthplace of Hugh Victor McKay (1865–1926), the inventor of the first commercially viable combine harvester. McKay was educated at Drummartin primary school by his father until the age of thirteen. McKay's father, Nathaniel McKay, moved to Victoria in 1852.

McKay was the fifth child of twelve, and the son of immigrants from Monaghan in Ulster. This suggests that the etymology of Drummartin is likely to be Irish, and may come from either the hamlet of Drummartin in County Sligo or from Drummartin in southern Dublin.

== See also ==
- Elmore
- Raywood
