= Hugh Victor McKay =

Australian industrialist (1865–1926)

H. V. McKay CBE
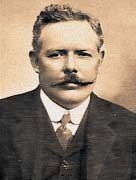
- Born: Hugh Victor McKay; 21 August 1865; Drummartin, Victoria, Australia
- Died: 21 May 1926 (aged 60); Sunbury, Victoria, Australia
- Occupations: Industrialist; philanthropist
- Known for: Sunshine Harvester
- Spouse: Sarah Irene Graves (m. 1891)
- Children: 3

Hugh Victor McKay CBE (21 August 1865 – 21 May 1926), commonly known as H. V. McKay, was an Australian industrialist who is known for heading the company that developed the Sunshine Harvester, arguably the first commercially viable combine harvester. He subsequently established the Sunshine Harvester Works, which became one of Australia's largest manufacturers of agricultural equipment.

== Early life ==
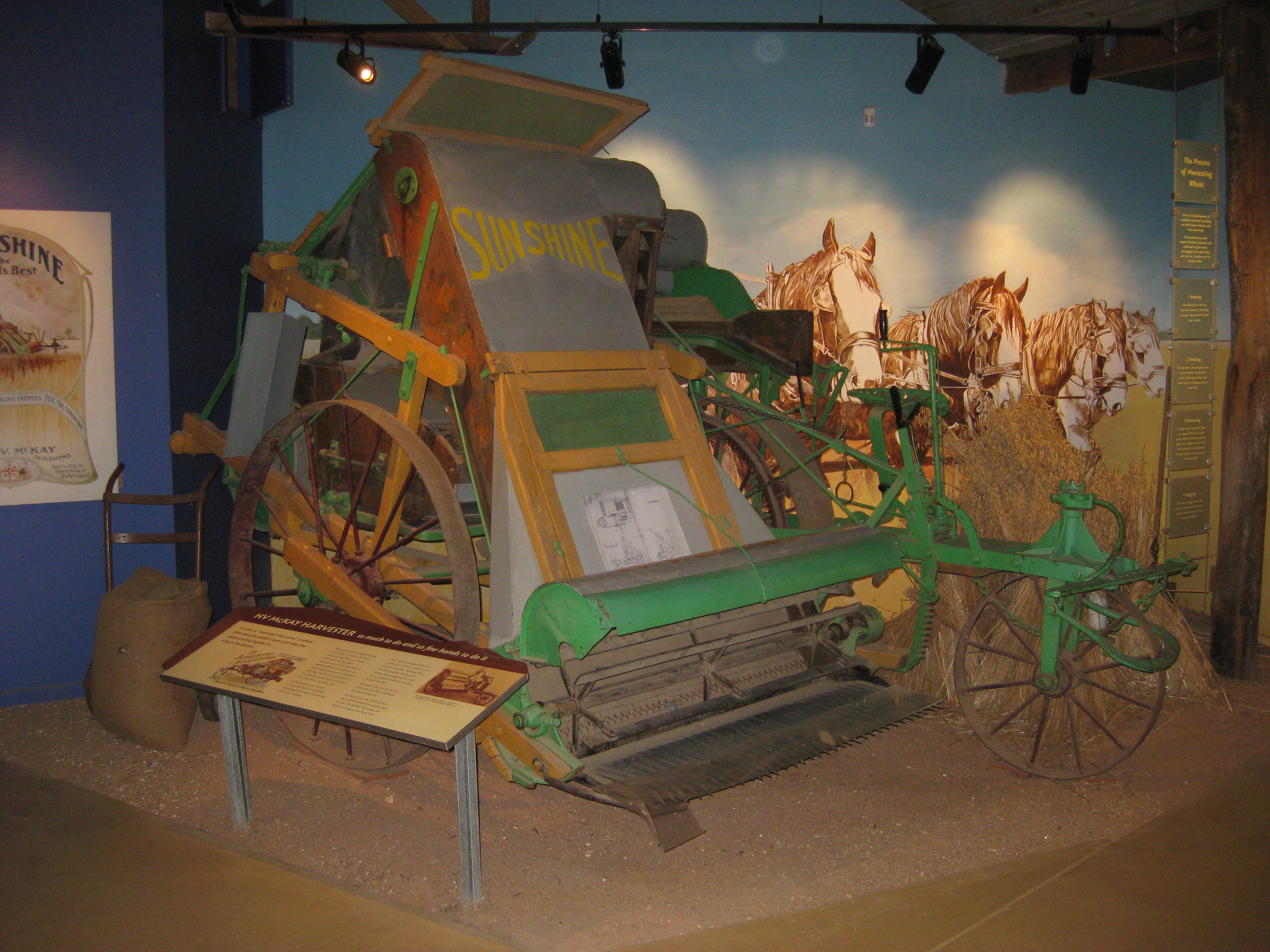
HV McKay Harvester on display at the Campaspe Run Rural Discovery Centre, Elmore, Victoria, Australia.

McKay was born the fifth child of a family of twelve near Drummartin, between Elmore and Raywood, Victoria. His parents were Irish Protestants from Monaghan in Ulster who arrived in Victoria in 1852. His father, Nathaniel McKay had been a stonemason and then a miner, before becoming a farmer around the end of 1845.

Hugh attended Drummartin Primary School, and received some education from his father Nathaniel, before returning to the farm at 13. In 1883 he read about combine harvesters in California. With his brother John and his father he built a prototype stripper-harvester by January 1885 and patented the Sunshine Harvester on 24 March 1885, which revolutionised wheat harvesting and sold throughout the world. Although he lost a Victorian Government prize for the first working stripper-harvester to James Morrow in 1885, he successfully commercialised his invention, and had them built under contract in Melbourne and Bendigo. In 1888, he opened a working factory in Ballarat. In 1891 he married Sarah Irene Graves.

He later acquired the Braybrook Implement Works, and renamed it the Sunshine Harvester Works after his Sunshine Harvester. In 1907, the residents of Braybrook Junction voted to rename the suburb Sunshine. The plant was expanded rapidly and at its peak employed nearly 3000 workers. It was the largest factory in Australia and as an example of entrepreneurship has probably not been surpassed in Australia.

== Harvester judgement ==
A dispute between McKay and the unions representing the Sunshine workers was heard before the Commonwealth Court of Conciliation and Arbitration in Melbourne between 7 October 1907 and 8 November 1907. H. B. Higgins heard evidence from employees and their wives. In the Harvester Judgement, he obliged McKay to pay his employees a wage that guaranteed them a standard of living which was reasonable for "a human being in a civilised community", regardless of his capacity to pay. McKay successfully appealed this judgement, but it became the basis of the basic wage, which dominated economic and industrial relations in Australia until the 1980s.

== Sunshine Gardens ==
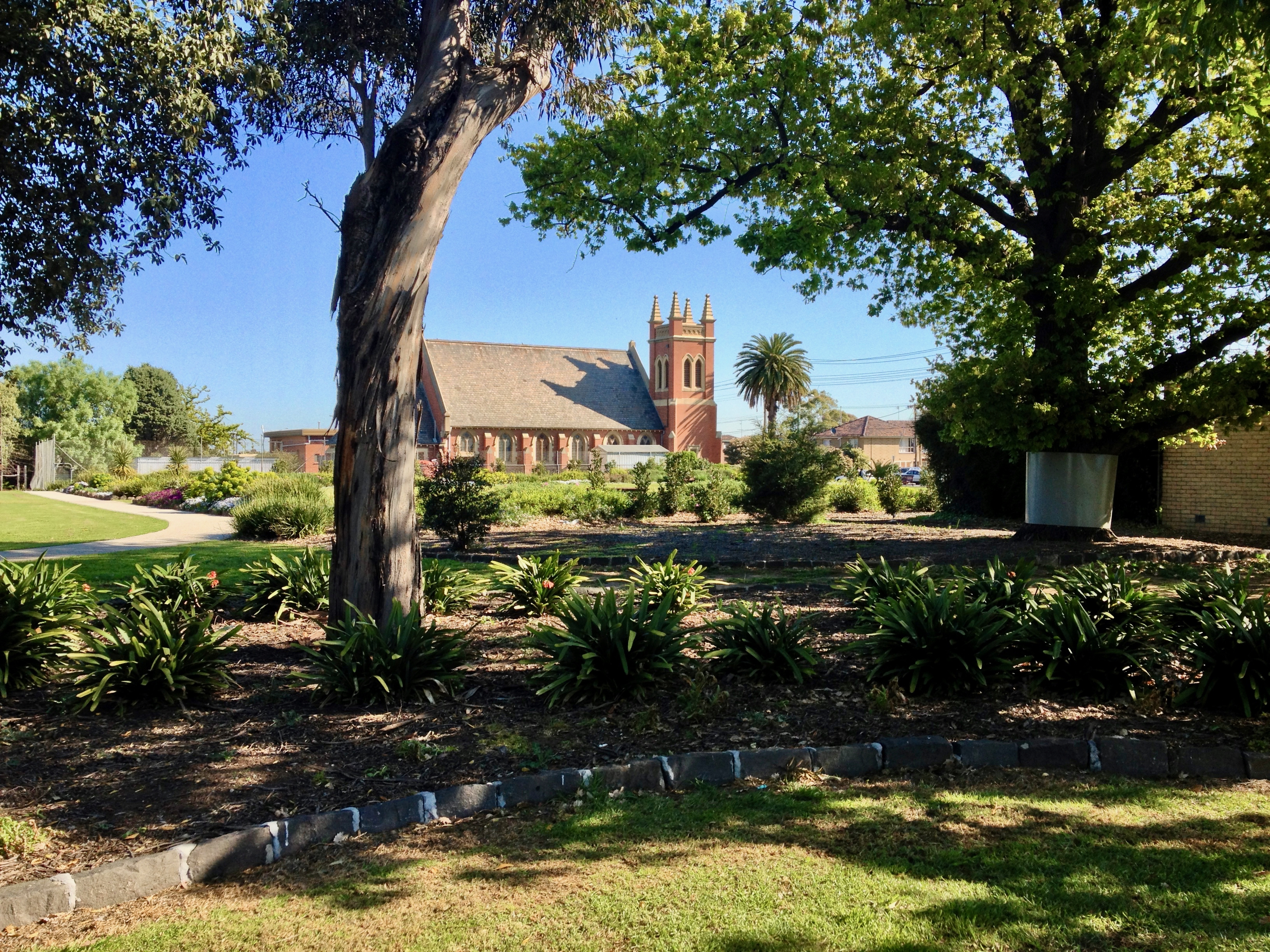
The gardens and church, funded by McKay

In 1909 the Sunshine Gardens were developed to provide an amenity for the employees of the Sunshine Harvester Works. Designed by the assistant city engineer at Ballarat Mr F. A. Horsfall and laid out by head gardener S. G. Thompson, the three-hectare (seven-acre) gardens were sited alongside the factory and incorporated recreation facilities and popular horticultural displays. When completed, the gardens included tennis courts and pavilion, a bandstand, a bowling green, a substantial house for the head gardener, a conservatory and associated works areas. Under inaugural curator Thompson (1909–27), and curators James Willan (1930–39) and Harold Gray (1939–50), the gardens developed a reputation for its chrysanthemums and dahlias, attracting workers and their families, as well as other local residents. In 1953, the management of Sunshine Gardens was handed to the newly established City of Sunshine. At this time, it was renamed as the H. V. McKay Memorial Gardens. In 2007 the Friends of McKay Gardens was formed to help maintain the gardens. The gardens and the adjacent Sunshine Presbyterian Church, also funded by McKay and completed in 1928, after his death, were jointly added to the Victorian Heritage Register on 13 September 2001 in recognition of their historical significance.

== Later life and legacy ==
McKay was appointed a Commander of the Order of the British Empire in 1918 for his service to war industries.

McKay died at Rupertswood, a mansion in Sunbury, Victoria on 21 May 1926 and was survived by his wife, daughter Hilda Stevenson, and two sons, Hugh Victor McKay Jr., and Cecil Newton McKay, an aviator. McKay's probate was valued at £1,448,146; a codicil vested the income from 100,000 shares in the H. V. McKay Charitable Trust, chaired by George Swinburne, with the aim to improve country life and aid charity in Sunshine.

== See also ==
- H. V. McKay Memorial Gardens and Church
- H. V. McKay offices
- Sunshine Harvester
- Sunshine Harvester Works
- Sunshine Technical College
