= Sunshine Harvester Works =

Agricultural equipment factory in Melbourne, Australia

- The Sunshine Harvester logo on a 1927 combine harvester

- The former factory site, undated

- Location of the former factory in Greater Metropolitan Melbourne
- Alternative names: Massey Ferguson complex; H. V. McKay factory

General information
- Status: Completed
- Type: Factory remnants
- Architectural style: Edwardian Baroque; Inter-War Moderne
- Location: Devonshire, Hampshire, and Harvester roads, Sunshine, City of Brimbank, Melbourne, Victoria, Australia
- Coordinates: 37°46′55″S 144°49′52″E
- Named for: Sunshine Harvester
- Year built: from 1905–
- Completed: 1907; 119 years ago
- Closed: 1971–1986
- Demolished: 1992 (excluding remnants)
- Client: H. V. McKay Pty Limited

Technical details
- Material: Bricks
- Grounds: c.32 ha (80 acres) (1926)

Design and construction
- Engineer: H. B. Garde

Victorian Heritage Register
- Official name: Massey Ferguson Complex
- Type: Registered place
- Designated: 7 February 2008
- Reference no.: H0667
- Heritage overlay no.: HO3
- Category: Manufacturing and Processing

The Sunshine Harvester Works was an agricultural equipment factory, located at the junction of Devonshire, Hampshire, and Harvester roads, in Sunshine, in the City of Brimbank, in the western suburbs of Melbourne, in Victoria, Australia.

Founded by Australian industrialist, Hugh Victor McKay for his Sunshine Harvester operations, the former factory complex was one of Australia's largest and most active industrial plants and employers of labour, and which made a major contribution to community life in Melbourne's western suburbs, for much of the twentieth century. Operated by the eponymous family-owned firm of H. V. McKay Pty Limited and the later multinational companies, the complex at Sunshine, relocated from Ballarat, started operations from c. 1907, and became the most public face of what became a company town. Whilst most of the former factory buildings were decommissioned and destroyed from the 1970s, remnants of one of the former buildings, completed in 1927, remain extant. The Massey Ferguson company exited the site between 1971 and 1986 when the site was sold, and most of the remaining buildings were demolished by 1992, and the site subsequently redeveloped.

Engineering development of the site, in the early 1900s, was headed by H. B. Garde.

The remaining extant former factory building was added to the Victorian Heritage Register on 7 February 2008 in recognition of its historical significance; and was also added to a non-statutory list by the Victorian branch of the National Trust on 2 February 1987.

== History ==
=== Ballarat years ===
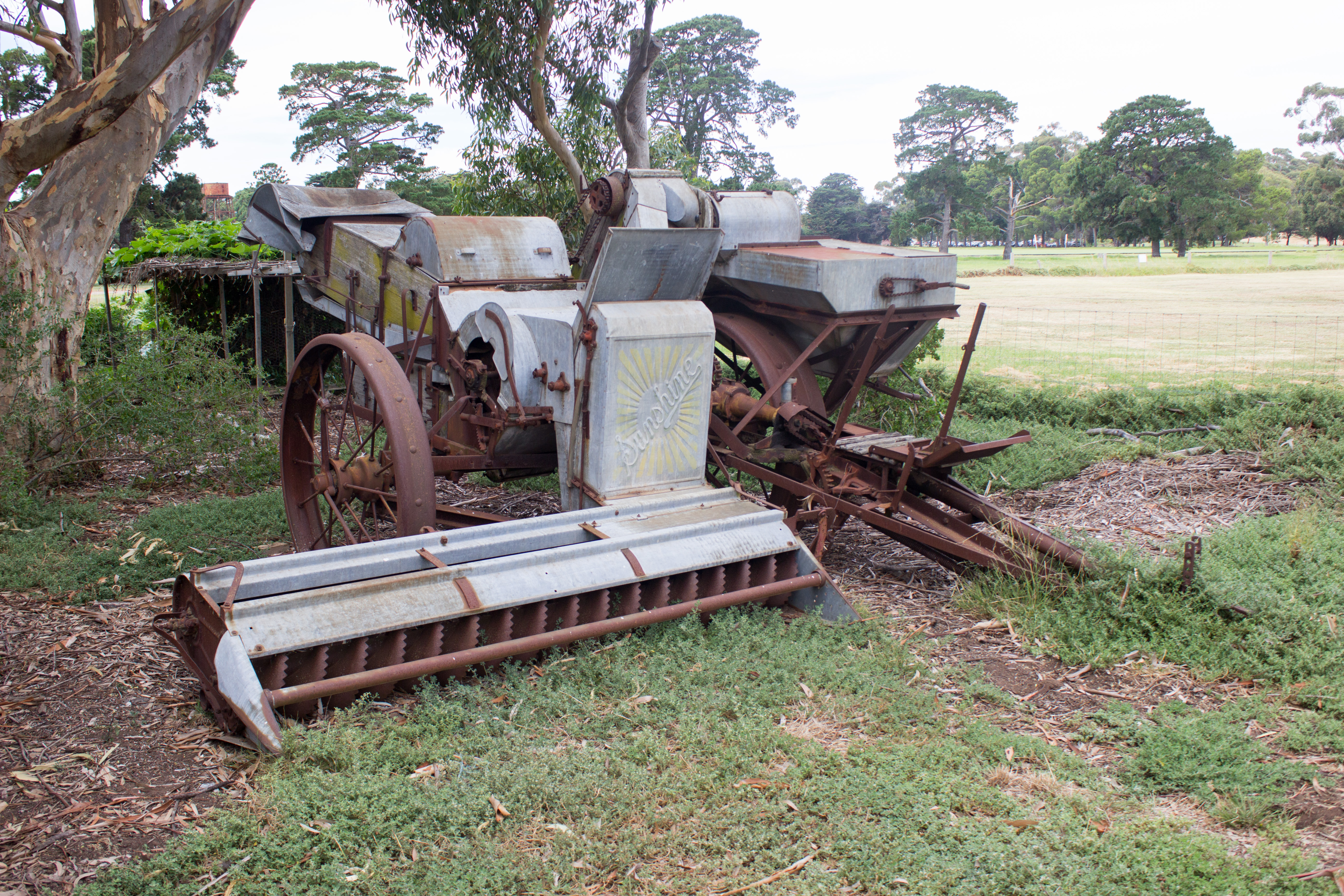
A Sunshine harvester at Werribee Park Mansion, where it was used

Hugh Victor McKay, known as H. V. McKay, and his eponymous firm as H. V. McKay Pty Limited, successfully developed and marketed the combine harvester for grain harvesting in the 1880s and established the company and its manufacturing plant in Ballarat in 1889. McKay's harvester revolutionised the wheat industry in Australia became one of Australia's best-known pieces of agricultural machinery. McKay became famous for producing, manufacturing, and exporting the machine and for his association with developments in industrial relations in Australia.

The name "Sunshine" is assumed to have been given by McKay to his harvester works after he attended a lecture by the American evangelist Reverend Thomas De Witt Talmage who visited Victoria in 1894. Another account holds that the name was suggested by James Menzies, who painted the first model.

=== Sunshine factory site development ===
In 1904, H. V. McKay purchased, by way of tender, the Braybrook Implement Company works on a 6.5-hectare (16-acre) site at the junction of the northern and western rail routes in the town of Braybrook Junction, 12 km (7.5 mi) west of the centre of Melbourne. McKay began to transfer his operations there from Ballarat in 1905 and completed the move in 1907, by which time the works had trebled in size. As a consequence, McKay purchased a further 112 hectares (276 acres) of farmland adjoining the site, in order to build the factory and associated structures. The facility expanded to become one of the largest manufacturing industries in Australia, producing a wide range of agricultural implements. Within three years of commencing operations at Sunshine Harvester Works, McKay was employing 1,000 workers.

=== The Sunshine Estate ===
In 1906, H. V. McKay initiated the development of the Sunshine Estate, a residential estate intended to provide housing for workers at his Sunshine Harvester Works. The location of McKay’s Sunshine Estate is situated in the eastern part of the suburb now known as Albion with, as of 2026, many of the estate’s houses still standing.

The first 76 allotments were advertised for sale in April 1907. In the same year, the township of Braybrook Junction adopted the name Sunshine, with the railway station's renaming from Braybrook Junction to Sunshine officially taking effect on 15 July 1907. The post office also adopted the name Sunshine, which was reported in The Argus on 10 July 1907. Thus the town of Braybrook Junction came to be known as Sunshine.

This housing estate was where the firm's employees could buy houses and enjoy community facilities such as gardens, tennis courts and a church. The streets were lined with trees and electricity was supplied to the housing estate from the factory.

=== Early factory growth and expansion ===
The factory became the largest in the Southern Hemisphere, and, in its early stages, McKay successfully increased the concentration and efficiency of the workers: ‘between 1907 and 1910–11, McKay’s workforce expanded from just over 400 to around 1,500’. McKay rapidly expanded the factory to become the largest manufacturing plant in Australia and, at its peak, it employed nearly 3,000 workers. Housing for the Sunshine Harvester Works' employees swelled the local population and the town of Sunshine was touted as the "Birmingham of Australia".

=== The Harvester Judgement ===
The Sunshine Harvester Works was also the site of a protracted industrial dispute in 1907, between McKay and the unions representing the Sunshine workers, based on claims for wages and conditions. The previous year, the Deakin federal government passed its 'New Protection' legislation, the Excise Tariff (Agricultural Machinery) Act, which imposed an excise on locally-made machinery with an exemption for manufacturers if their workers were paid a fair and reasonable wage. McKay applied in 1907 to the Commonwealth Court of Conciliation and Arbitration to be exempt from paying this excise. Heard before Justice H. B. Higgins in Melbourne during October–November 1907, evidence from employees and their wives was tendered regarding conditions at the factory and costs for supporting their families. In the Harvester Judgement, Higgins obliged McKay to pay his employees a wage that guaranteed them a standard of living which was reasonable for "a human being in a civilised community", regardless of his capacity to pay. Higgins' judgement was male workers seven shillings a day for male labourers, with higher rates for skilled labour. McKay successfully appealed this judgement in the High Court of Australia, and it became the benchmark industrial decision which led to the creation of a minimum basic wage for Australian workers that dominated economic and industrial relations in Australia until the 1980s.

The Agricultural Implement Makers Union reacted by striking in 1911, to which McKay responded with a lockout of all union members. The strike lasted thirteen weeks, leaving the union bankrupt. It was the longest dispute in Australia's history to that date.

=== Further expansion ===
The general pattern of expansion of the factory site extended north from Devonshire Road parallel to the railway. Initially the office of the company was on the north side of Devonshire Road, and moved in 1909 when the new office building was built on the triangular block to the south of Devonshire Road, also facing the railway line. Another new administration office, showroom, and a clocktower opened on the north side of Devonshire Road in 1926. At the time of McKay's death in 1926, the factory complex covered 32 hectares (80 acres).

In 1930, the Canadian farm machinery manufacturer Massey Harris bought a controlling interest in H. V. McKay Pty Ltd, with the Australian operations of both firms being merged under the title H.V. McKay Massey Harris Pty Ltd. The McKay family retained a significant shareholding. Throughout World War II, H. V. McKay Massey Harris exported 20,000 Sunshine drills, disc harrows and binders to England, to facilitate an increase in food production.

=== Post WWII ===
Massey-Harris amalgamated with the eponymous British tractor firm of Harry Ferguson in 1953, and the McKay family's interest was sold in 1955 to the newly-formed multinational agricultural implement conglomerate Massey-Harris Ferguson, later rebranded as Massey Ferguson. The main centre of tractor and self-propelled harvester production was now in England, and the Sunshine site became the second largest plant in the conglomerate's network. A new administration building with clock tower was constructed in 1956 on the north side of Devonshire Road, across from the previous head office building.

From the 1970s, when many Australian-based manufacturing industries were experiencing financial difficulties, the business progressively contracted from between 1971 and 1986, when the site was sold; and most of the buildings were demolished in 1992.

== Remaining buildings ==
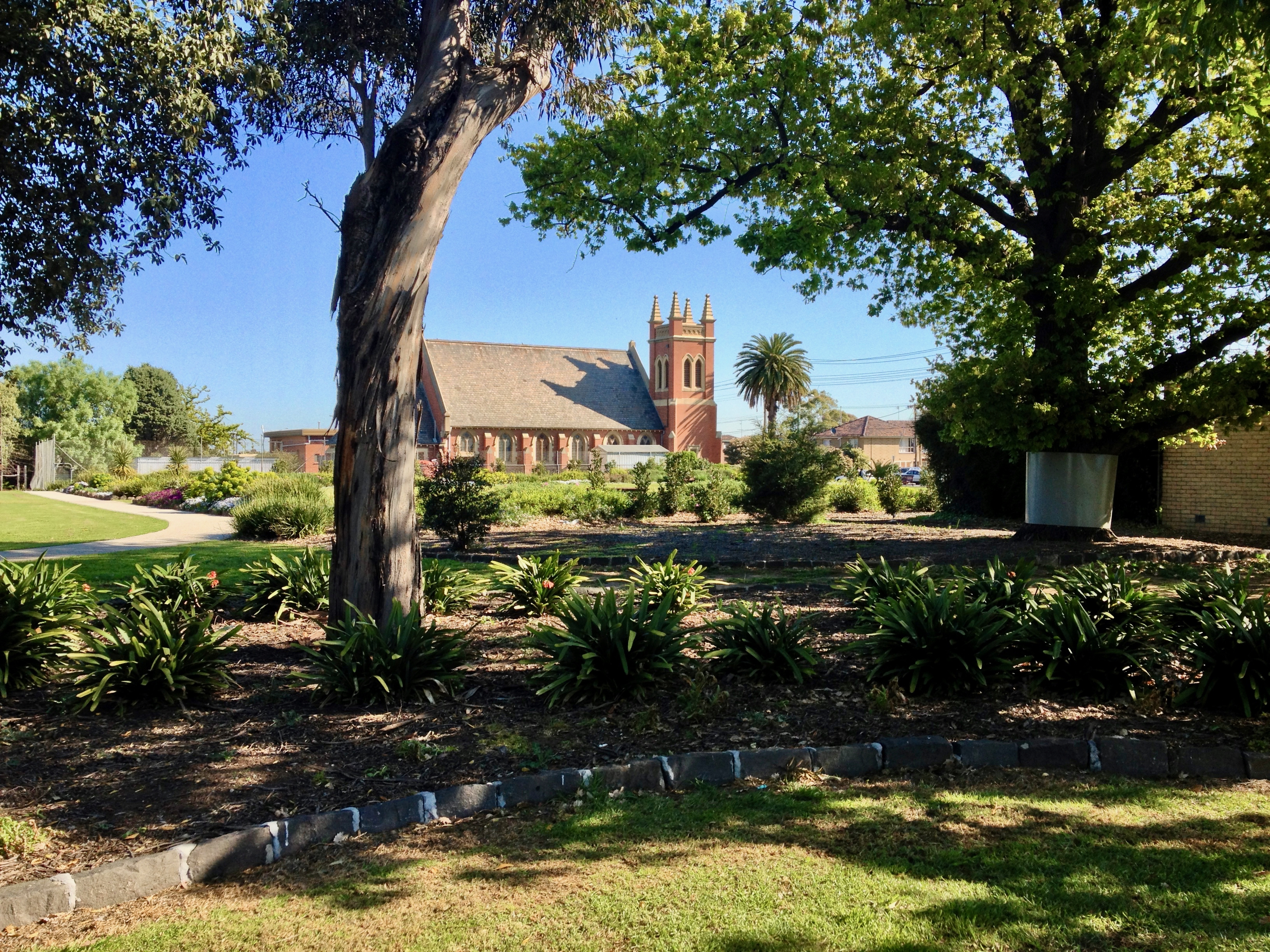
The H.V. McKay Memorial Gardens with the Sunshine Presbyterian Church in the background

Most of the former factory was demolished and the site was redeveloped to become the Sunshine Marketplace, the major shopping centre in Sunshine. All that remains of the Sunshine Harvester Works is the former bulk store (now part of the Visy Cares Hub, a major integrated youth and community support centre), the factory gates, and the clock tower, while across Devonshire Rd, the H. V. McKay offices, the company’s former head office buildings, still stand and are in use as the premises of many local businesses. These are listed on the Victorian Heritage Register along with two other civic works provided to the local community by H. V. McKay: the Sunshine Gardens (now called the H. V. McKay Memorial Gardens) and Sunshine Presbyterian Church, located on the southern edge of the gardens.

== See also ==
- Architecture of Melbourne
- H. V. McKay Memorial Gardens
- H. V. McKay offices
- List of places on the Victorian Heritage Register in the City of Brimbank
- Manufacturing in Australia
- Sunshine Technical College
