= Urban gardening =

Urban gardening is the practice of cultivating and tending a garden in an urban area. Gardening in an urban environment utilizes planting-areas available in cities, such as: community gardens, schoolyards, backyards, rooftops, balconies, walls, window sills, containers, and indoor spaces.. Guerrilla gardening is a form of urban gardening in which garden-making occurs in areas of the city that are publicly or privately owned, without permission.

Urban gardening serves a variety of purposes including, producing fresh fruits and vegetables for gardeners and local communities, improving urban biodiversity, providing educational opportunities, and community building.

== Characteristic of urban gardens ==
Urban gardening, also referred to as urban agriculture, is the cultivation of plants in metropolitan areas. Urban gardens can take a variety of forms depending on the available growing space. The purpose of an urban garden may also vary: providing fresh produce to local communities, promoting learning about environmental sustainability, and fostering community engagement through community focused work, are some common purposes. Here are some characteristics of urban gardens and what can be considered as one:

=== Location ===
Urban gardens are located in cities, densely populated urban areas. They can be incorporated into the city in various ways, such as in parks, vacant lots, on rooftops, in containers on balconies, at community centers, schoolyards, in indoor spaces such as greenhouses and in vertical gardens. David Farrier notes "Farms have sprouted in Brooklyn shipping containers, subterranean car parks in Paris, second world war bomb shelters beneath London and on rooftops from Hong Kong to Singapore."

=== Size ===
Urban gardens can vary significantly in size, ranging from small individual plots or container gardens to larger community gardens or urban farms. Some urban agriculture projects may cover several acres of land, while others may consist of just a few square feet.

=== Origins and the Rise of Urban Gardening ===
The concept of food cultivation in urban centers dates back to around 3,500 BC, with Mesopotamian farmers setting aside plots for farming within cities. Another notable examples of urban farming includes the Aztecs, who created chinampas, or floating islands, to grow food around and in cities such as Tenochtitlan. In the late 1800s and early 1900s allotment gardens became a popular way for European cities to help the urban poor become self-sufficient. For a small fee, families could purchase a plot to grow food. "Victory Gardens" or "War Gardens", supplemented food supply during times of rationing caused by the world wars.

With the rise of modern urbanization, urban gardening is undergoing a major revival. Cities around the world embraced urban gardening and farming. The gardens themselves differ in region, from the small rooftop gardens of New York to the medium sized city farms of Japan.

=== Design ===
Urban gardens can have diverse designs and layouts, depending available space, environmental conditions, use, and aesthetic preferences. They may include traditional raised beds, vertical gardens, container gardens, edible landscapes, permaculture designs, or hydroponic systems, among others.

=== Community Involvement ===
Many urban gardens emphasize community involvement and participation, allowing residents to come together to plan, create, and maintain the garden spaces. Community gardens, in particular, often involve shared responsibilities and decision-making processes among participating members.

== See also ==
- Container garden, growing plants in pots or other containers, rather than in ground
- Urban horticulture, growing crops or ornamental plants in urban or semi-urban setting
- Urban agriculture, food production in urban setting
- Window box
- Urban park
