= H. V. McKay Memorial Gardens =

Heritage-listed public industrial garden and church in Melbourne, Victoria, Australia

- Sunshine Gardens (former)
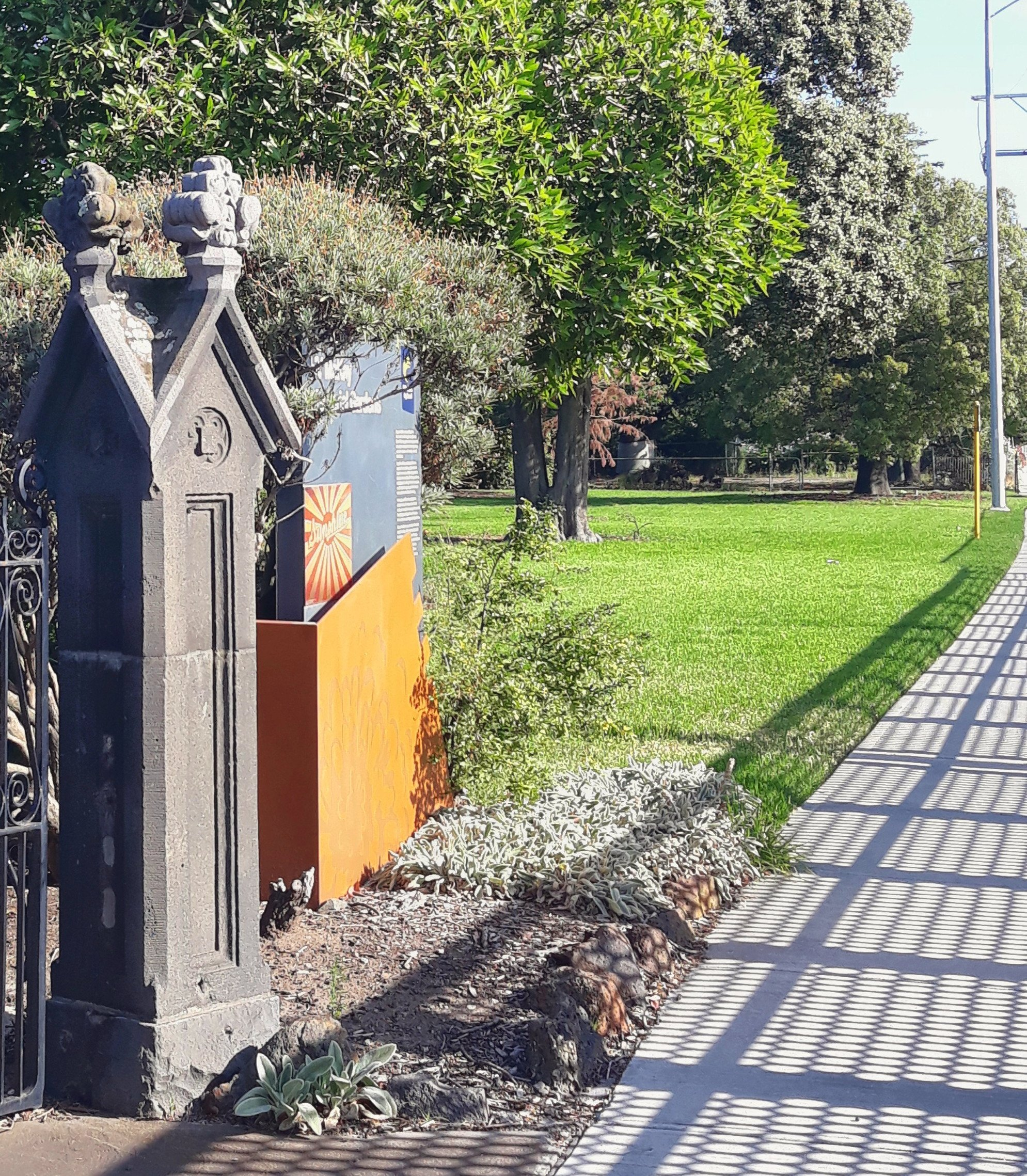
- Stone gatepost in the gardens
- Interactive map of H. V. McKay Memorial Gardens
- Type: Urban industrial park; Adjacent church and manse
- Location: 118–122 Anderson Road, Sunshine, City of Brimbank, Melbourne, Victoria, Australia
- Coordinates: 37°47′01″S 144°49′42″E
- Area: 3 ha (7.4 acres)
- Established: 1909; 117 years ago
- Founder: Hugh Victor McKay
- Designer: F. A. Horsfall; S. G. Thompson
- Etymology: Hugh Victor McKay
- Owner: City of Brimbank
- Open: All year
- Website: brimbank.vic.gov.au

Victorian Heritage Register
- Official name: H. V. McKay Memorial Gardens and Church
- Type: Registered place
- Criteria: a., b., h.
- Designated: 13 September 2001
- Reference no.: H1953
- Heritage overlay no.: HO10
- Categories: Parks, Gardens and Trees; Landscape - Cultural

Register of the National Estate
- Official name: McKay Memorial Gardens Precinct
- Type: Defunct register
- Designated: 22 June 1993
- Reference no.: 18360

Sunshine Presbyterian Church
- McKay Memorial Church
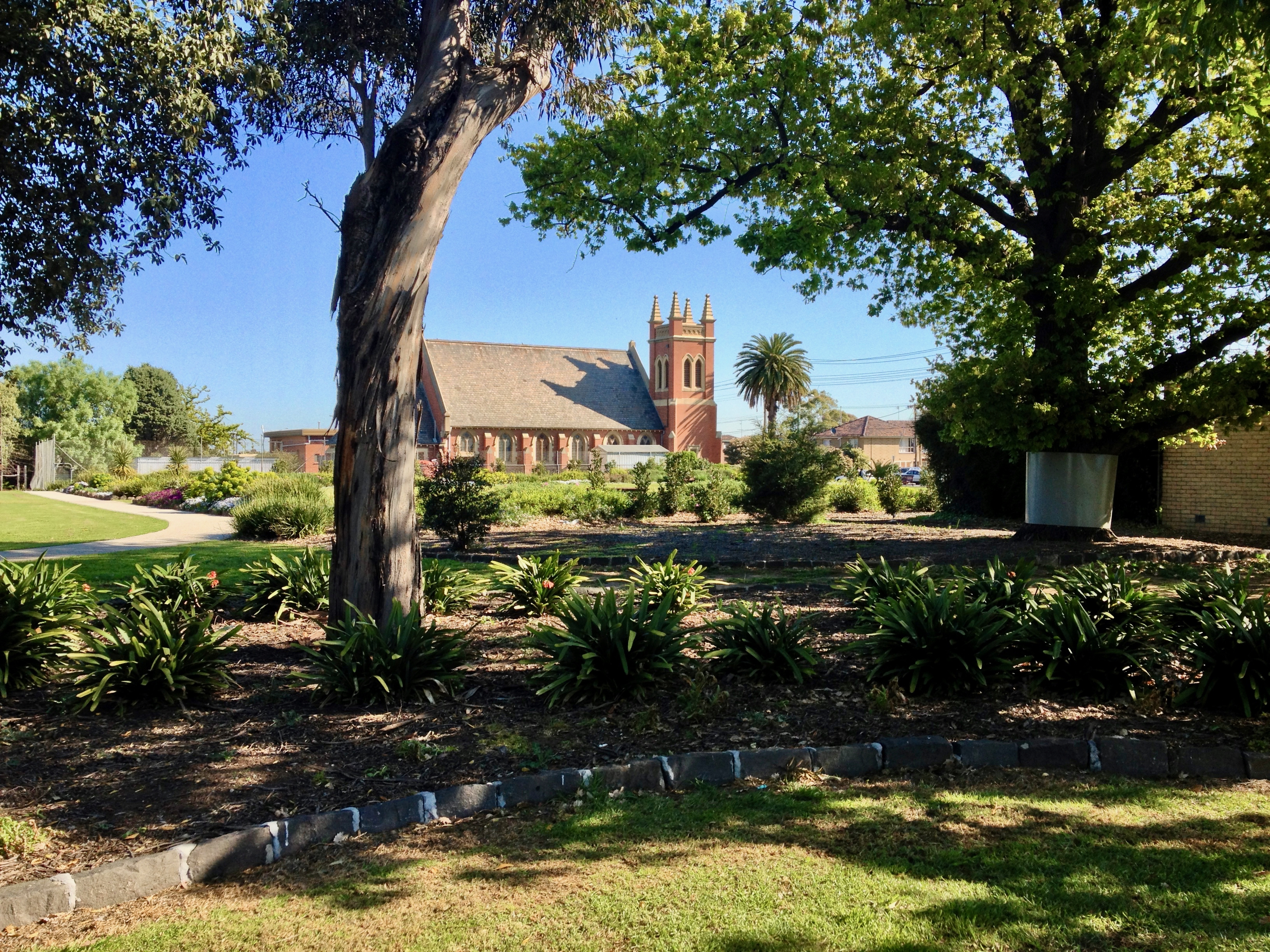
- The church, viewed through the memorial gardens

- Location of the church in Greater Metropolitan Melbourne
- 37°47′02″S 144°49′40″E
- Location: 120 Anderson Road, Sunshine
- Country: Australia
- Denomination: Presbyterian
- Website: sunshinepresbyterian.com.au

History
- Status: Parish church
- Founded: c. 1909
- Founder: Hugh Victor McKay
- Dedicated: 9 October 1910 (wooden church)

Architecture
- Functional status: Active
- Architect: J. Raymond Robinson
- Architectural type: Church
- Style: Interwar Gothic
- Years built: 1926–1928
- Groundbreaking: 15 May 1926
- Completed: 1928; 98 years ago
- Construction cost: A£5,400

Specifications
- Materials: Bricks; stone

Administration
- Division: Presbyterian Church of Victoria

The H. V. McKay Memorial Gardens, originally known as the Sunshine Gardens, is an urban industrial garden and its adjacent church building and manse, that serve as memorials to Hugh Victor McKay, who founded the gardens and church, co-located at 118–122 Anderson Road in Sunshine, in the City of Brimbank, in the western suburbs of Melbourne, in Victoria, Australia.

Founded in 1909 – on the traditional lands of the Wurundjeri people – by Australian industrialist, H. V. McKay located near the Sunshine Harvester operations for his eponymous firm, the gardens became a place of relaxation for workers in what became a company town. As the McKay–Massey Ferguson factory complex grew to become one of Australia's largest and most active industrial plants and employers of labour, the company made a major contribution to community life in Melbourne's western suburbs. The gardens are Australia's oldest remaining industrial garden and one of only two remaining in Australia. The development of the gardens was not only an expression of H. V. McKay's own social philosophy, they also represented a changing attitude to urban planning that is known as the garden suburb movement.

The gardens and the adjacent church were jointly added to the Victorian Heritage Register on 13 September 2001 in recognition of their historical significance; and were also added to non-statutory lists by the Victorian branch of the National Trust on 10 June 1992 and 13 July 1989, and the now defunct Register of the National Estate on 22 June 1993.

== History ==
=== H. V. McKay and Sunshine Harvester ===
Hugh Victor McKay CBE, more commonly known as H. V. McKay, was an Australian industrialist who is known for heading the company that developed the Sunshine Harvester, arguably the first commercially viable combine harvester. He subsequently established the Sunshine Harvester Works, which became one of Australia's largest manufacturers of agricultural equipment, located in Sunshine, in what is today's Melbourne western suburbs. McKay is also renowned for his connection with the Harvester Judgement that, on appeal in 1907, became the basis of the basic wage, that dominated economic and industrial relations in Australia until the 1980s.

=== Establishment of the gardens ===
At the instigation of H. V. McKay, in 1909 approximately 3 hectares (7 acres) were developed to provide an amenity for the employees of the Sunshine Harvester Works. The triangular site was designed by the assistant city engineer at Ballarat, F. A. Horsfallm, and laid out by head gardener S. G. Thompson, sited alongside the factory and incorporated recreation facilities and popular horticultural displays. After approximately twelve months a bowling green and tennis court were established. For some years after his death in 1926, the McKay family funded the upkeep of the gardens, at the time called the Sunshine Gardens.

When finalised, the site included tennis courts and a pavilion, a bandstand, a bowling green, a substantial house for the head gardener, a glasshouse, and associated works areas. The manse and a major extension to the bowling club were added in 1960, a new tennis court was also built in 1960 adjacent to the church, and the original nursery and curator's house were removed in the 1970s.

Initially funded by the family of H. V. McKay and the Sunshine Harvester company, in 1953 management of the Sunshine Gardens was handed to the newly-established City of Sunshine, now the City of Brimbank. In 1953, the gardens were renamed as the H. V. McKay Memorial Gardens.

=== 21st-century developments ===
The Friends of the Gardens Group was established in 2007 to support the ongoing preservation and conservation of the gardens and, in April 2012, local residents campaigned to preserve the original state of the public space.

2011 plans by the Regional Rail Link Authority (RRL) proposed the destruction of part of the gardens as part of a grade separation along Anderson Road, despite the fact that this impact did not appear in its planning documents. The proposal entailed the removal of more than 130 square metres (1,400 sq ft), destruction of path systems, and the relocation of the last remaining heritage fabric. Terry Mulder, the Minister for Public Transport in the Baillieu and Napthine governments, responded to the controversy by saying: "you can’t keep everyone happy"; having previously expressed his opposition to the plan. After community resistance, the RRL reduced its acquisition of land to approximately five square metres (fifty-four square feet).

== Description ==
=== Gardens ===
The McKay Memorial Gardens are a small-to-medium sized urban public garden in the western suburbs of Melbourne. The 3-hectare (7-acre) garden site is bounded by Anderson Road to the west, Chaplin Reserve to the south and a railway line to the east with sweeping lawns, pathways, specimen trees and a northern entrance featuring iron gates and a bluestone gatepost. The site includes the Sunshine Presbyterian Church – a memorial to H. V. McKay; – the associated brick pier and pipe fence along the Anderson Street boundary; two Canary Island date palms; objects integral to the church – being the pulpit and the ministers chair with memorial plaques to George McKay affixed to both; – and a modern railway footbridge, built 2013, which provides direct access between the gardens and the former "Sunshine Harvester Works", located on the eastern side of the railway line.

The gardens serve as a high quality municipal park/garden with few vestiges of the historic nature of the garden visible to users. Under inaugural curator Thompson (1909–27), and curators James Willan (1930–39) (Note: One source states that Willian commenced in 1934; not 1930.) and Harold Gray (1939–50), the gardens developed a reputation for their chrysanthemums and dahlias, attracting workers and their families, as well as other local residents. The site is popular for weddings and picnics and are well used by residents of the municipality and the region. Numerous large trees exist in both grassed areas and garden beds, with much of the original tree planting intact. Flower beds with perennials, annuals and roses are cultivated in parts of the gardens. The former propagating glasshouse now serves as a conservatory with public displays from time to time. The church, manse, tennis courts, and a lawn bowling club exist within the gardens area; for the most part, substantially intact and/or renewed, providing a mix between passive and active recreational pursuits.

In 2021, it was reported that Council was considering erecting a statue in the park, in honour of H. V. McKay.

=== Sunshine Presbyterian Church ===
The Sunshine Presbyterian Church, also known as the McKay Memorial Church, (Note: And other variants, including the Hugh Victor Mckay Memorial Presbyterian Church, the H. V. Mckay Memorial Presbyterian Church, and the Sunshine Presbyterian Church, McKay Memorial.) is a Presbyterian church, located within the H. V. McKay Memorial Gardens precinct. The church is administered by the Presbyterian Church of Victoria.

The first Presbyterian church services commenced in June 1907 at the Sunshine State School; and were transferred to the Mechanics Institute in Hampshire Road in November 1907. In 1908, H. V. McKay offered the church administrators several sites in Sunshine, with the church selecting the corner of Devonshire Road and Anderson Road. The first building erected at this site was a wooden building and was dedicated on 9 October 1910. On 15 May 1926, a few days prior to his death, McKay laid the foundation stone for a new brick church building, designed by J. Raymond Robinson in the Interwar Gothic style.

By 1928, the brick church was completed at a cost of A£5,400 and the wooden building was repurposed as a Sunday School; subsequently destroyed by arson in January 1973. After the death of H. V. McKay in 1926, his family presented a number of gifts to the church, including the pulpit and furnishings; the communion cloths; the memorial window, named in his honour; another window in memory of Hubert Selwyn McKay; a further large memorial window; and carpets.

An honour board in the church commemorates the eight church members who were killed in active service during World War I.

As of December 2022, the church was open for worship.

== See also ==
- Parks and gardens of Melbourne
- List of churches in Melbourne
- List of places on the Victorian Heritage Register in the City of Brimbank
- Presbyterian Church of Australia
