= Sunshine, Victoria =

Sunshine
- Suburb
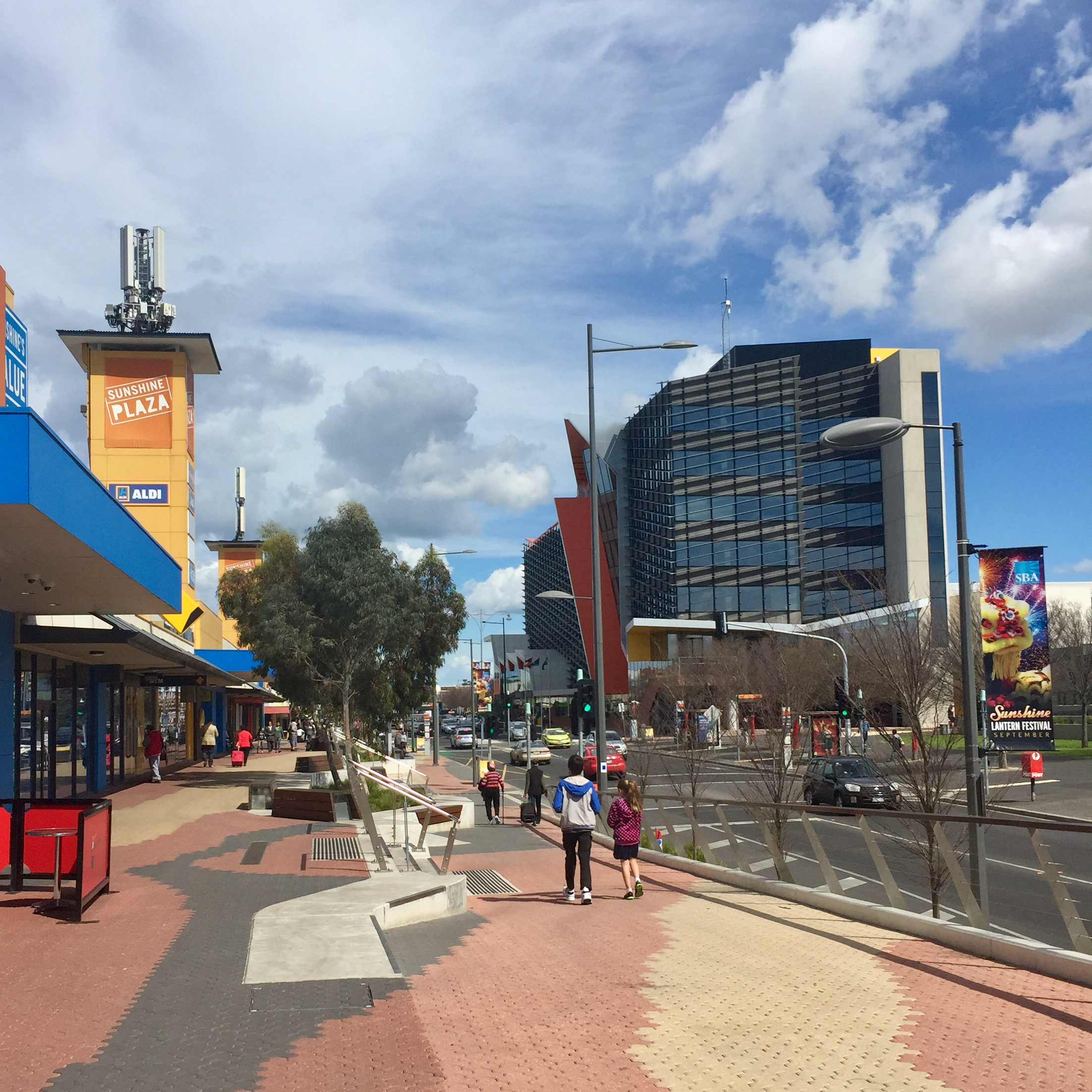
- Sunshine town centre

- Interactive map of Sunshine
- Coordinates: 37.781°S 144.832°E
- Country: Australia
- State: Victoria
- City: Melbourne
- LGA: City of Brimbank
- Location: 12 km (7.5 mi) from Melbourne

Government
  - State electorate: Laverton
  - Federal division: Fraser

Area
  - Total: 4.9 km^{2} (1.9 sq mi)
- Elevation: 42 m (138 ft)

Population
  - Total: 9,445 (2021 census)
  - Density: 1,928/km^{2} (4,990/sq mi)
- Postcode: 3020
- County: Bourke
Suburbs around Sunshine
Albion	Sunshine North	Braybrook
Sunshine West	Sunshine	Braybrook
Sunshine West	Brooklyn	Tottenham

Sunshine is a suburb in Melbourne, Victoria, Australia, 12 km (7.5 mi) west of Melbourne's city centre, located within the City of Brimbank local government area. Sunshine recorded a population of 9,445 at the 2021 census.

Sunshine, initially a town just outside Melbourne, is today a residential suburb with a mix of period and post-War homes, with a town centre that is an important retail centre in Melbourne's west. It is also one of Melbourne's principal places of employment outside the CBD with many industrial companies situated in the area, and is an important public transport hub with both V/Line and Metro services at Sunshine railway station and its adjacent major bus interchange.

Sunshine is both a low-density residential suburb and one of Melbourne's principal places of employment outside the city centre. Many heavy and light industrial companies are situated in and around the area and it is an important retail centre in Melbourne's west. In addition to Sunshine's street shopping strips there are two shopping centres, the Sunshine Plaza and the Sunshine Marketplace. There is a Village Cinemas multiplex, the "Village 20 Sunshine Megaplex", at the Sunshine Marketplace.

== History ==
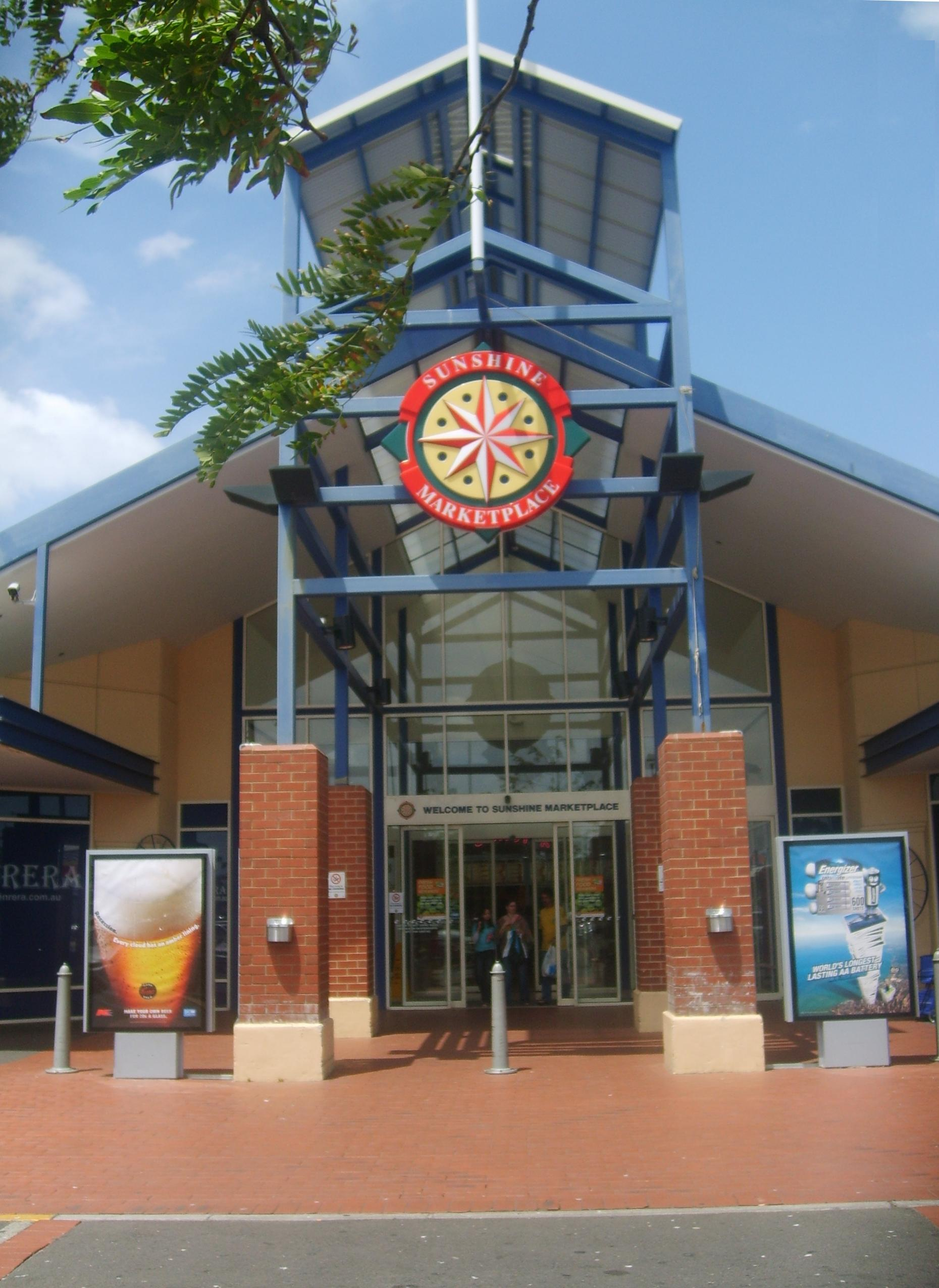
Sunshine Marketplace

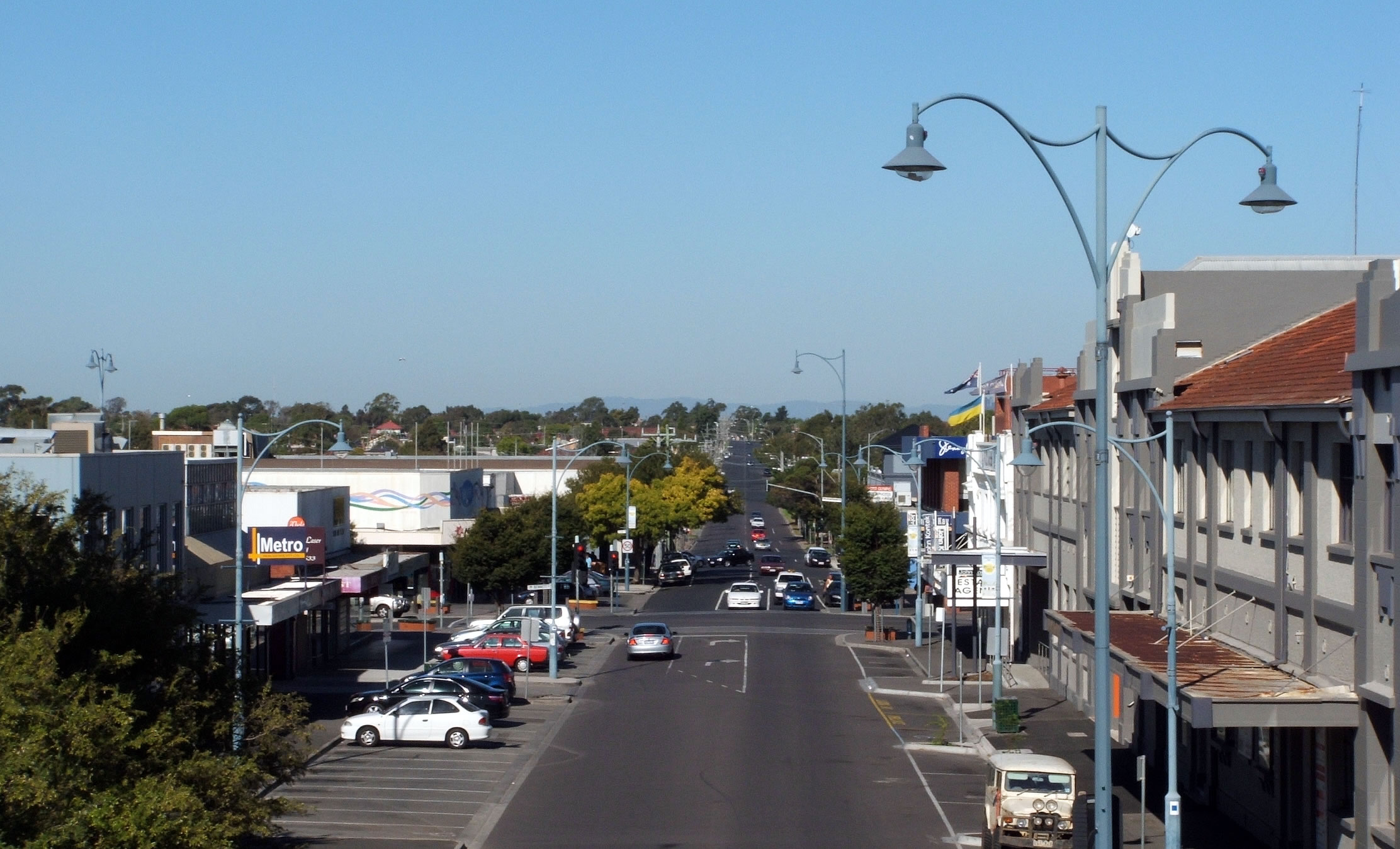
Devonshire Rd, Sunshine town centre

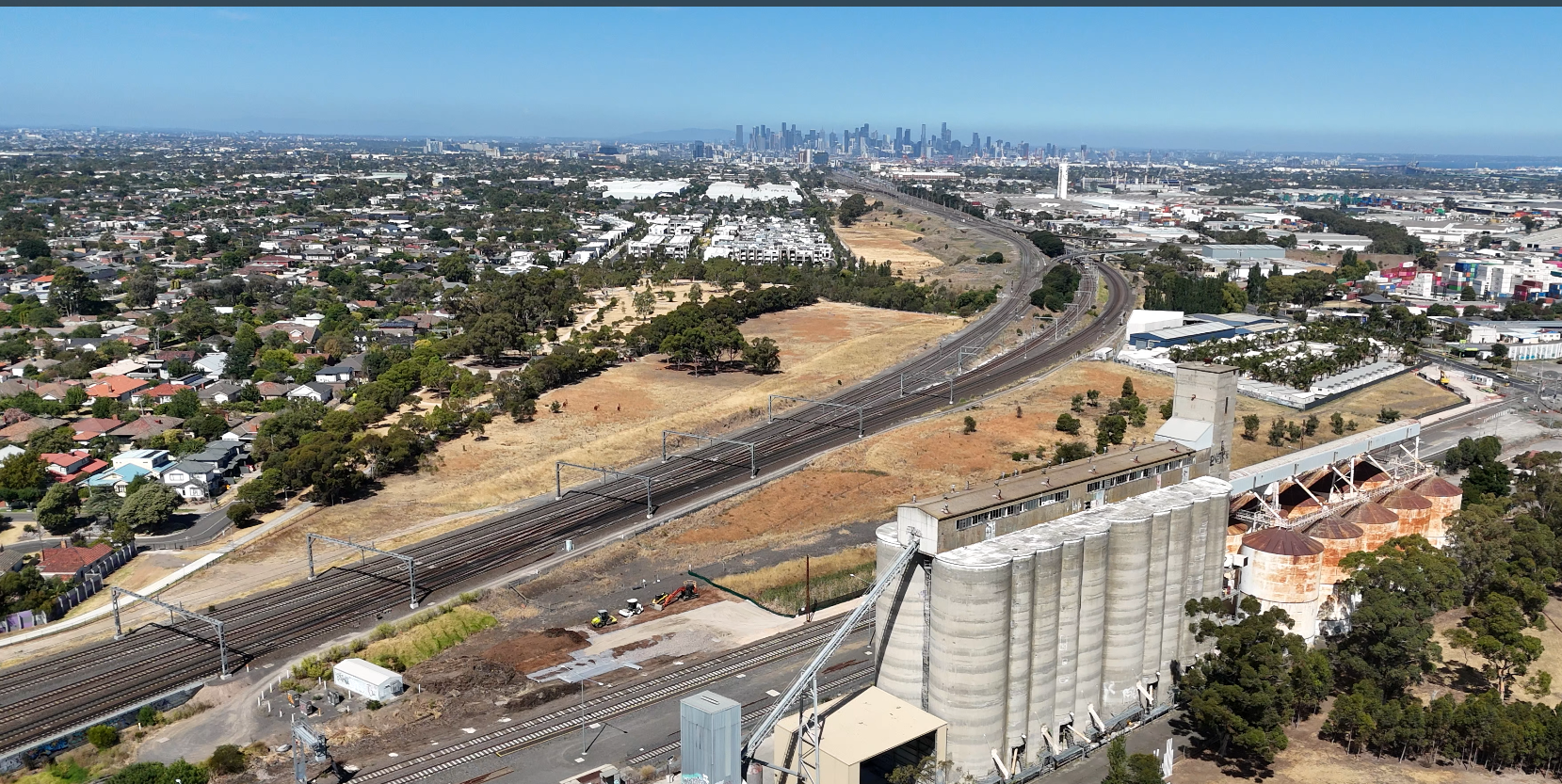
Aerial view towards Melbourne CBD taken from near Sunshine train station

=== 19th century ===
The farms and settlements in the area now known as Sunshine first came under the Braybrook Road District (1860–1871) which later became the Shire of Braybrook (1871–1951).

On the 13th of January 1859, the Melbourne to Bendigo line opened operating as far as Sunbury, though only one train station existed in the Sunshine area: this was Albion & Darlington station which opened on the 5th of January 1860 at the site of the current Albion station. When the Melbourne to Ballarat line was built as a branch line of the Bendigo line, a new station was constructed at the junction of the two lines: Braybrook Junction station, opening on 7 September 1885. The area around this station thus came to be known as Braybrook Junction and the Braybrook Junction Post Office opened on 25 August 1890.

=== 20th century ===
==== Pre-war Sunshine ====
In 1904, H. V. McKay bought a factory in the area called the Braybrook Implement Works. In 1906, McKay moved his agricultural machinery manufacturing business from Ballarat to his newly acquired factory in Braybrook Junction. The factory was renamed the Sunshine Harvester Works and it became the largest manufacturing plant in Australia.

In 1906, H. V. McKay secured 400 acres (160 ha) and initiated the development of the Sunshine Estate, a residential estate intended to provide housing for workers at his Sunshine Harvester Works. The Sunshine Estate, located today in the eastern part of the area now known as the suburb of Albion, was partially designed according to the principles of the Garden city movement, an influential town planning movement of the early 20th century. The first 76 allotments of the Sunshine Estate were advertised for sale in April 1907. In July 1907, the train station, the post office, and the shire riding's names were changed from Braybrook Junction to Sunshine. Infrastructure and amenities established by McKay for Sunshine, the Sunshine Estate in eastern Albion, and the rest of Albion, included electric street lighting, parks and sporting grounds, public buildings, schools, and a library. The town of Sunshine (not a suburb of Melbourne at this point) and its suburbs became regarded as a model industry-centred community and, in effect, Sunshine became something of a company town for the Sunshine Harvester Works. Housing for the McKay's employees swelled the local population and the town of Sunshine was touted as the "Birmingham of Australia".

In 1907 an industrial dispute between owner H. V. McKay and his workers at the Sunshine Harvester Works led to the Harvester Judgement, the benchmark industrial decision which led to the creation of a minimum living wage for Australian workers.

The Sunshine train disaster on 20 April 1908 killed 44 people at Sunshine station.

In the early years of the Sunshine Harvester Works, the H. V. McKay Sunshine Harvester Works Pipe Band was formed. In 1909, a separate pipe band was formed by members of this factory-based band as the Sunshine & District Pipe Band. As of 2026, this latter pipe band still exists as Victoria Scottish Pipes & Drums and is one of Australia's oldest continuously functioning pipe bands, although it has long been based outside of Sunshine, for many years in Footscray, and currently in Williamstown.

==== The interwar period ====
Prue McGoldrick's My Paddock: An Early Twentieth Century Childhood is a memoir of growing up in Sunshine.

==== Post-World War II ====
After WWII, Sunshine increasingly became connected to the sprawling city of Melbourne as car-based travel enabled people to leave the inner city suburbs and move into houses on larger blocks in suburbia. In 1951, the old Shire of Braybrook was abolished and the City of Sunshine was established.

Sunshine was not immune when many Australian-based manufacturing industries started winding down during and after the 1970s. In 1992, the Massey Ferguson factory, formerly the Sunshine Harvester Works, was demolished to make way for the development of the Sunshine Marketplace.

On 15 December 1994, the City of Sunshine was abolished and Sunshine became part of the newly created City of Brimbank.

=== Heritage listings ===
The following places in Sunshine are listed on the Victorian Heritage Register:

- H. V. McKay Memorial Gardens and Church, 118–122 Anderson Road
- H. V. McKay offices, 2 Devonshire Road
- Sunshine Harvester Works, Devonshire, Hampshire, and Harvester roads
- Sunshine Technical College (former), 111 and 129–133 Derby Road

== Demographics ==
Sunshine is a highly multicultural suburb. In the post-WWII period, many immigrants from all over continental Europe settled in Sunshine. Today Sunshine still has significant populations from Italy, Greece, the former Yugoslavia, and Poland. It is also the main centre for Melbourne's Maltese community: indeed, the only branch of Malta's Bank of Valletta in the whole of Oceania was until 2017 situated on Watt Street, Sunshine.

From the late 1970s, many Vietnamese refugees settled in Sunshine and surrounding areas. The Vietnamese have opened small businesses such as groceries and restaurants throughout the Sunshine town centre. More recently, immigrants moving to Sunshine have come from Sudan, Burma and India.

In 2021, Sunshine had a population of 9,445. The most common ancestries given in the 2021 Australian census were English 17.0%, Australian 15.7%, Vietnamese 15.7%, Chinese 7.4% and Irish 6.6%. For country of birth, 45.8% of people were born in Australia, while the other most common countries of birth were Vietnam with 13.5%, India 4.7%, Nepal 3.7%, Philippines 2.4% and Myanmar 1.8%.

== Transport ==
=== Public transport ===
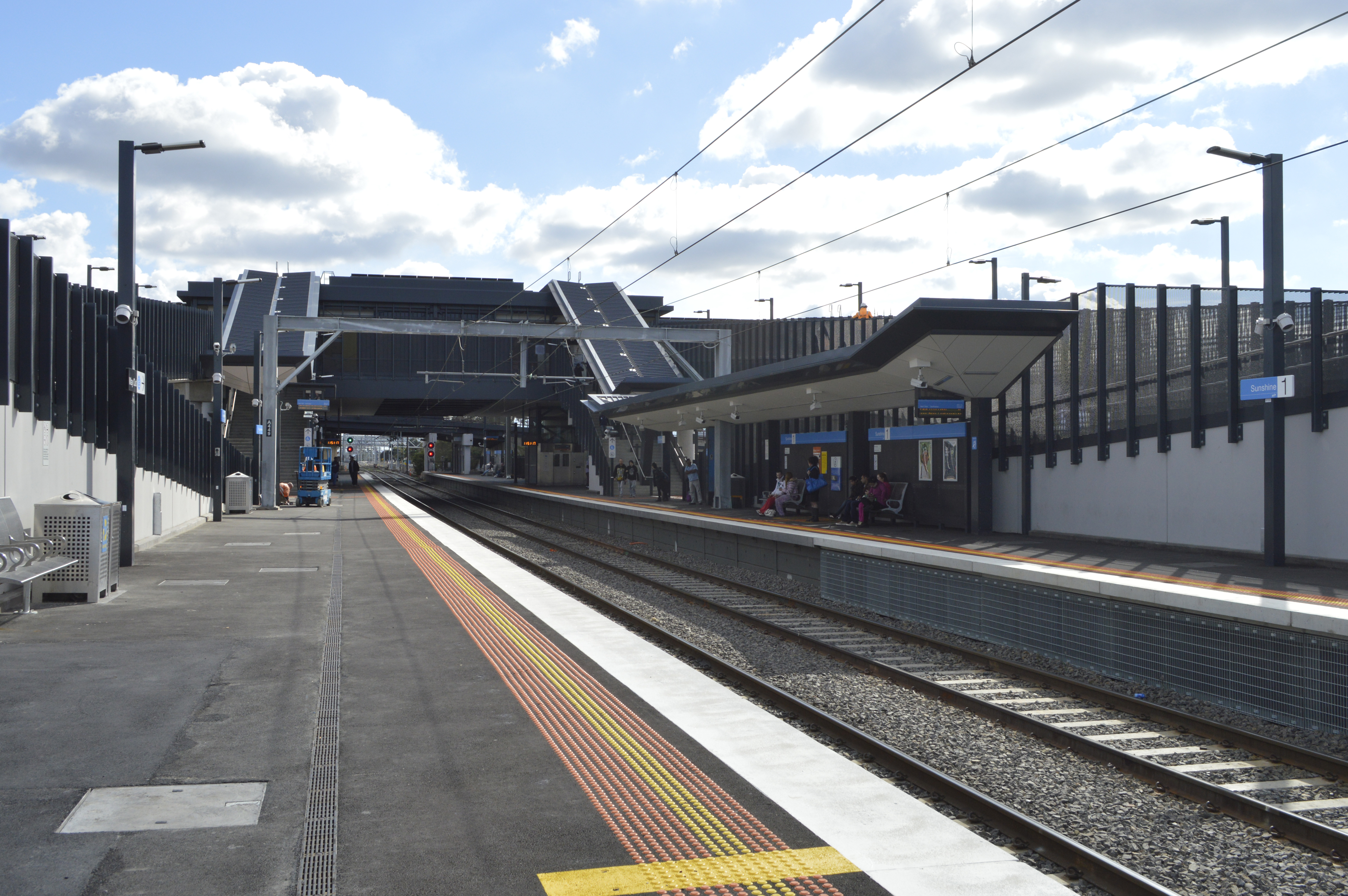
Sunshine Station platforms

Sunshine train station is a major point of interchange on Melbourne and Victoria’s rail network. It is both a suburban Metro station and a point of interchange for regional passenger services to Ballarat and Geelong. Classed as a Premium station, it is in the PTV zones 1+2 overlap. The station is one of Victoria's most important regional rail hubs: all three of the main western region V/Line lines (Ballarat, Bendigo and Geelong) meet at Sunshine, though currently Bendigo trains do not stop there – this will be fixed in 2030 when the station will be upgraded as part of the Melbourne Airport Rail protect and Sunshine station turned into the so-called Sunshine Superhub. Geelong services have stopped at Sunshine since the opening of the Regional Rail Link in 2015. The Sydney to Melbourne XPT passes through Sunshine, as it uses the Albion–Jacana railway line, but it does not stop there.

Sunshine bus interchange at Sunshine train station is the fifth biggest bus interchange in metropolitan Melbourne, having 14 different bus routes. Sunshine bus interchange was upgraded as part of the Regional Rail Link works, with the upgrade completed in 2014.

SkyBus buses from Sunshine station to Melbourne Airport, dubbed by the operator as the Sunshine Express, went into service in November 2025.

=== Active transport ===
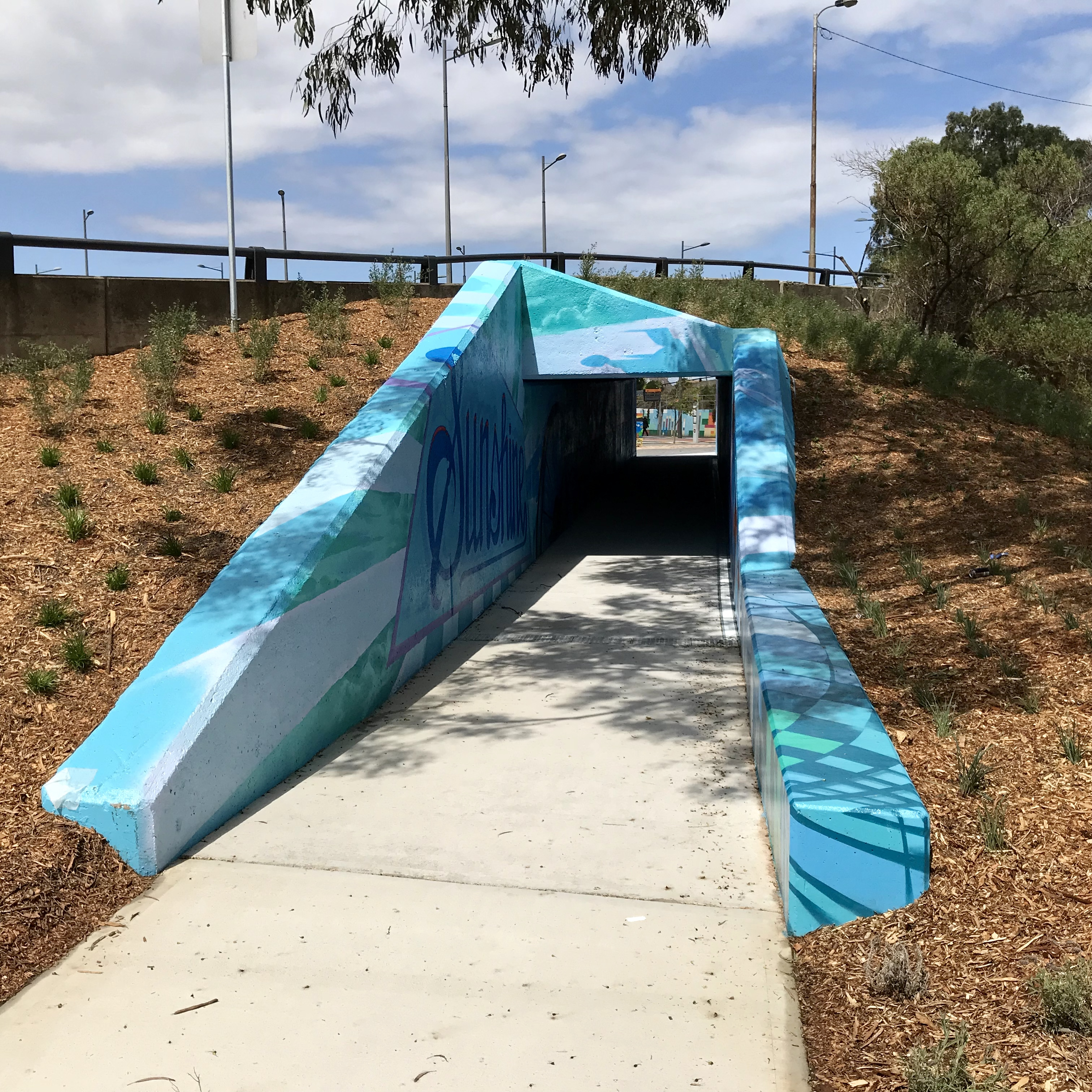
The Harvester Road Bike Path runs between Sunshine and Albion train stations. It opened in 2018 and includes the above underpass at Sunshine station.

In a 2018 study, Sunshine was named one of Melbourne's most walkable suburbs, a result of its origins as a stand-alone township with a town centre sitting at the heart of its own residential neighbourhoods, Sunshine and Albion.

Major cycle paths in the suburb include:

- the Kororoit Creek Trail
- the completely off-road 3 m (9.8 ft) wide shared-use path from Sunshine station to Tottenham station. This then connects to the bike path running from Tottenham station to West Footscray station
- the Harvester Rd and St Albans Rd bike paths from Sunshine station to St Albans station via Albion and Ginifer stations (with gaps), running beside the Sunbury line, and
- the Forrest St Path from Sunshine station to Deer Park station running beside the Melton line.

Cyclists in Sunshine are represented by BrimBUG, the Brimbank Bicycle User Group.

== Education ==
Educational institutions in Sunshine include Victoria Polytechnic, the TAFE division of Victoria University. Secondary schools include Sunshine College and Harvester Technical College.

== Places of worship ==
Christian churches in Sunshine include: Our Lady of the Immaculate Conception Catholic Church, Holy Apostles’ Anglican Church, Sunshine Uniting Church and Sunshine Presbyterian Church.

Other religious and spiritual centres include: Hue Quang Temple, a Vietnamese Buddhist temple.

== Sport and leisure ==
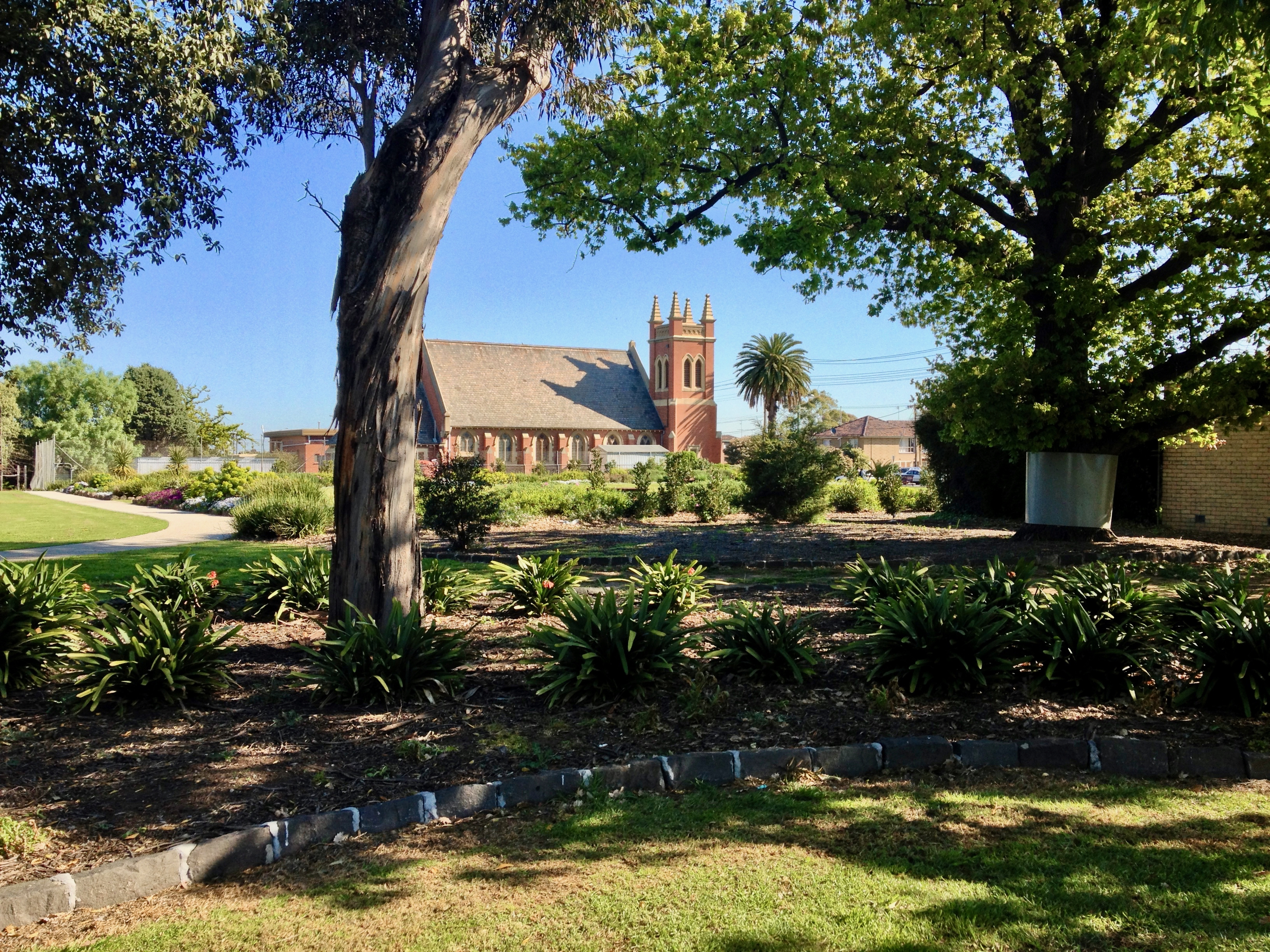
The H.V. McKay Memorial Gardens with the Sunshine Presbyterian Church in the background

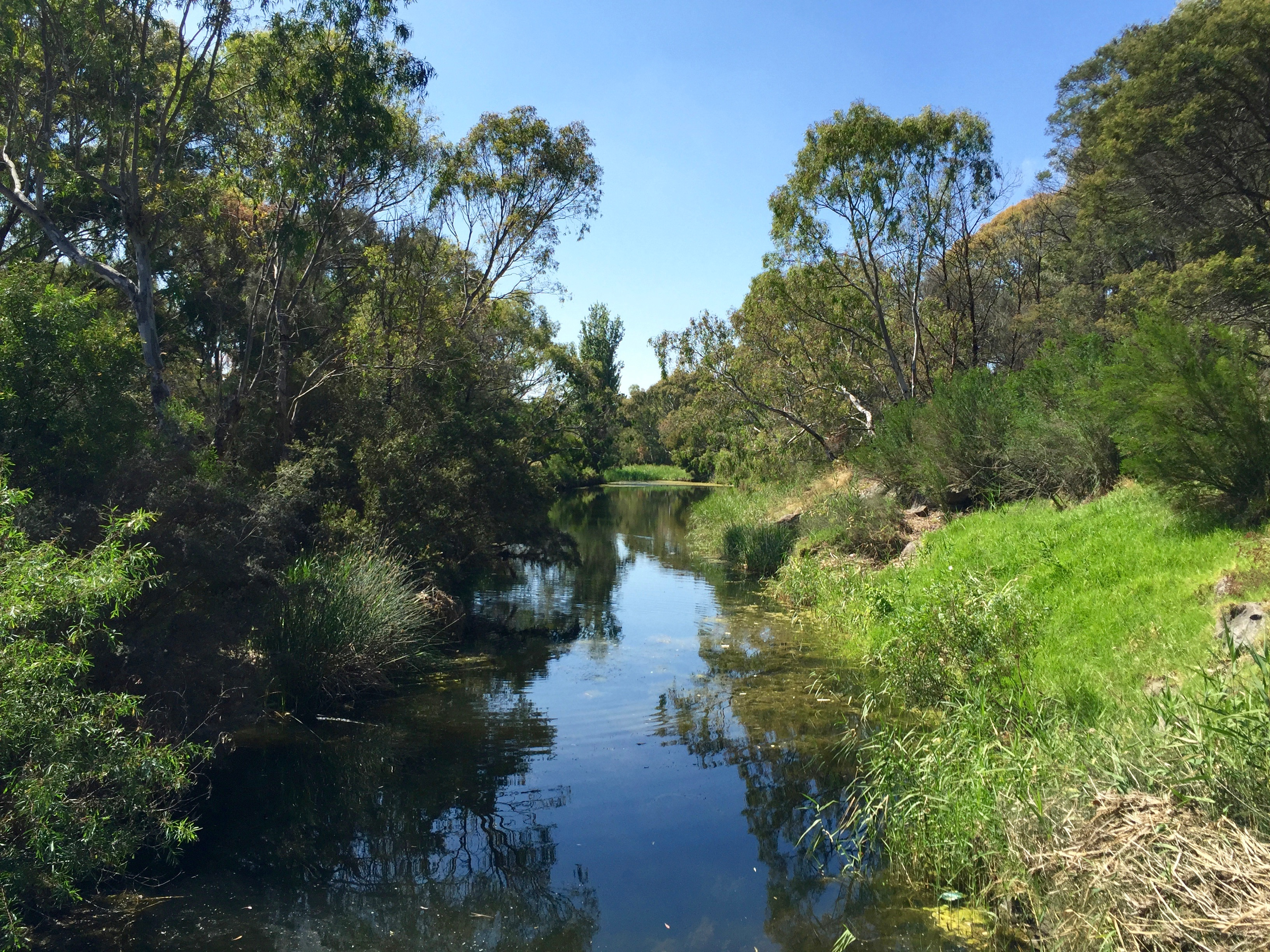
Kororoit Creek in Sunshine (south of Forrest Street)

The heritage-listed H.V. McKay Memorial Gardens on Anderson Road, established in 1909 by the industrialist H.V. McKay as Sunshine Gardens. It is one of two remaining industrial gardens in Australia.

The Kororoit Creek runs through Sunshine, along which runs the Kororoit Creek Trail for walking and cycling.

=== Sporting clubs ===
- Australian rules football: The Sunshine Football Club, the Sunshine Kangaroos, are the local Australian Rules football team. They compete in the Western Region Football League.
- Cricket: The Sunshine Cricket Club, the Sunshine Crows, is based at Dempster Park in North Sunshine.
- Rugby League: The Sunshine Cowboys are a Sunshine-based rugby league club playing in the Melbourne Rugby League competition.
- Baseball: The Sunshine Baseball Club, the Sunshine Eagles, has its home ground at Barclay Reserve on Talmage Street, Albion.
- Tennis: The Sunshine Park Tennis Club is based at Parsons Reserve, Sunshine.

== Notable residents ==
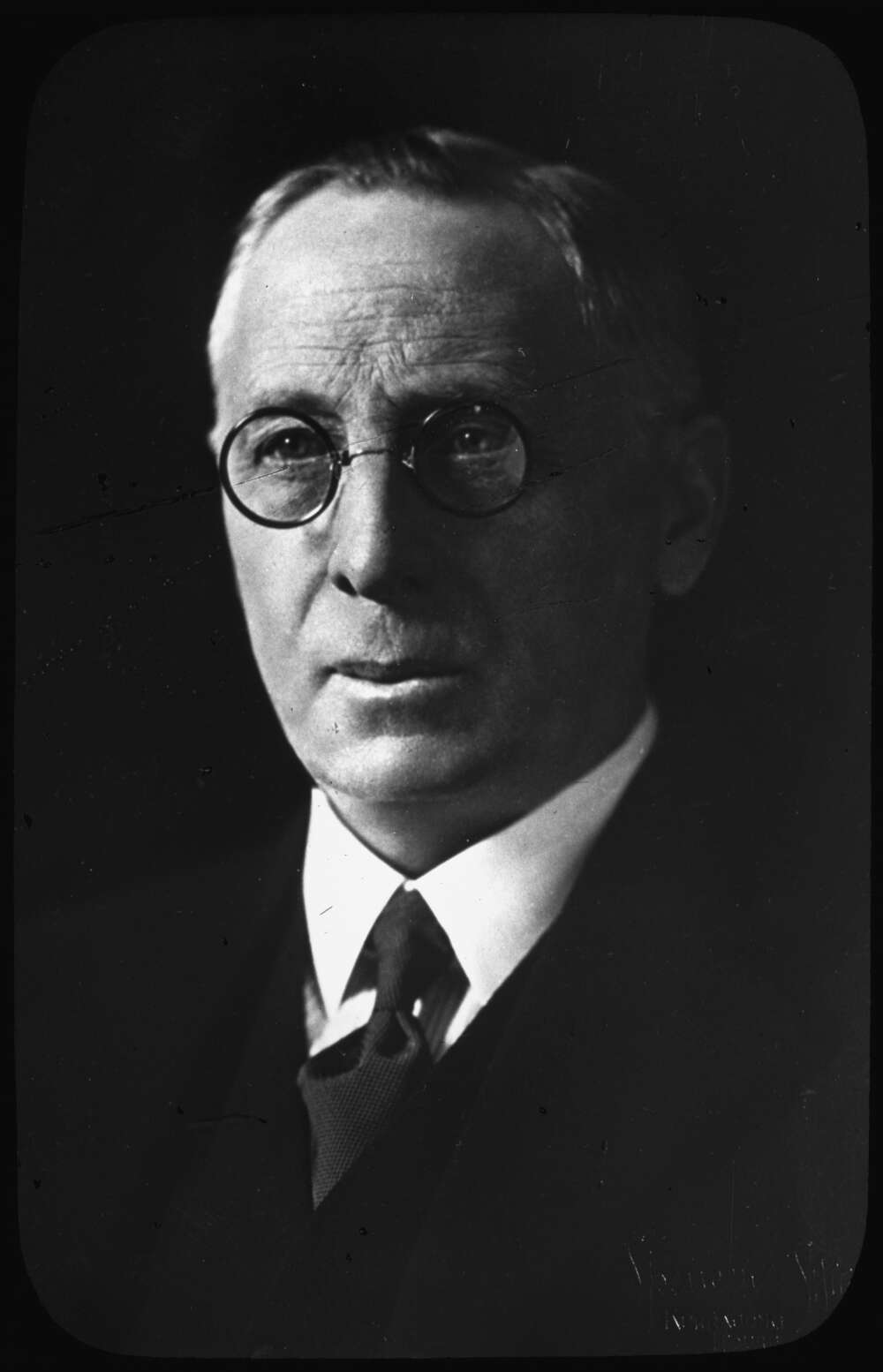
Rev. John Flynn, founder of the Royal Flying Doctor Service

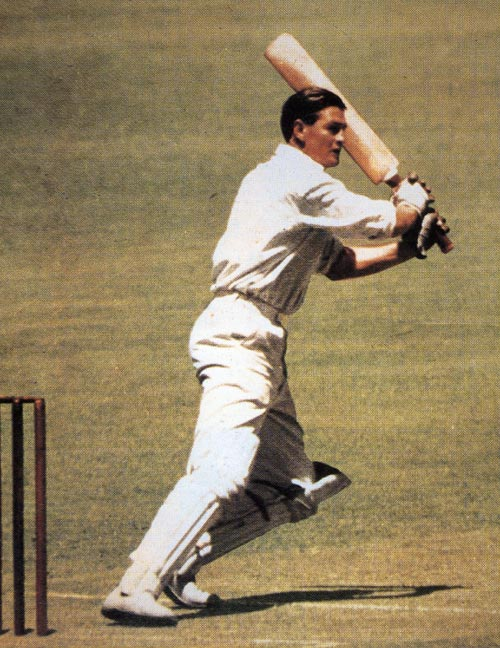
Australian cricket great, Keith Miller

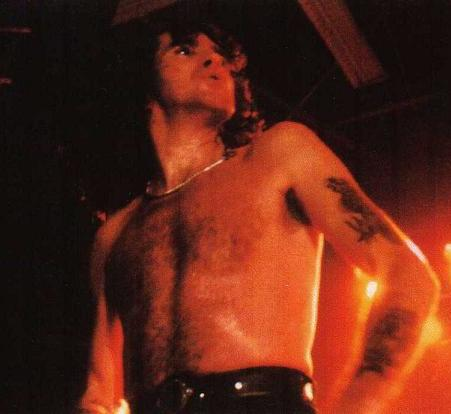
Bon Scott of AC/DC

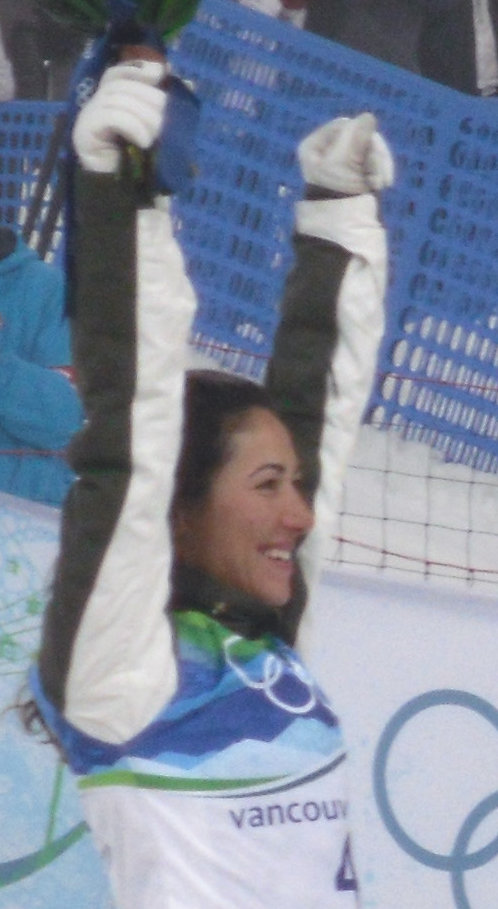
Freestyle skier Lydia Lassila

- Leigh Bowery, London-based avant-garde artist and designer
- Doug Chappel, comedian, actor
- Lester Ellis, former world-champion boxer grew up in West Sunshine.
- Reverend John Flynn, the Presbyterian minister and aviator who founded the Royal Flying Doctor Service and who is featured on the Australian twenty-dollar note
- Charles Greenwood, pastor who revived the Assemblies of God church in Australia
- John Kelly, artist who grew up in Sunshine
- Lydia Lassila, freestyle skier and 2010 Winter Olympic gold medalist who grew up and went to school in Sunshine
- Hugh Victor McKay, leading Australian industrialist of the early 20th century; founder of the Sunshine Harvester Works
- Keith Miller, Australian Cricket Hall of Famer of the 1940s and 1950s; born in Sunshine
- Craig Parry, one of Australia's premier golfers; born in Sunshine
- Walter "Wally" Peeler VC BEM, WWI soldier and first custodian of the Shrine of Remembrance
- Prince Philip, Duke of Edinburgh, who had an extended stay at the Derrimut Hotel in 1945
- Bon Scott, lead singer of AC/DC who lived in Sunshine as a child
- Stelarc, Cypriot-born, Sunshine-raised performance artist
- Richard Tyler, born 1947, fashion designer in New York and Hollywood
- Cal Wilson, stand-up comedian and radio and television personality

== In popular culture ==
- The disused former Albion Quarrying Company site, accessed from Hulett Street, Sunshine was the location for AC/DC's 1976 Jailbreak music video.
- In the 1997 film The Castle, the Kerrigans' daughter Tracey obtained her hairdressing qualification from Sunshine TAFE.
- In the television series Kath & Kim, Kath Day-Knight has obtained numerous qualifications from Sunshine TAFE.
- Sunshine is the setting of the 2007 film Noise.
- Sunshine and surrounding suburbs are the principal settings of the 2017 SBS drama series Sunshine.

== See also ==
- City of Sunshine – former local government area
