= Reid government =

Australian government from 1904 to 1905

Reid government

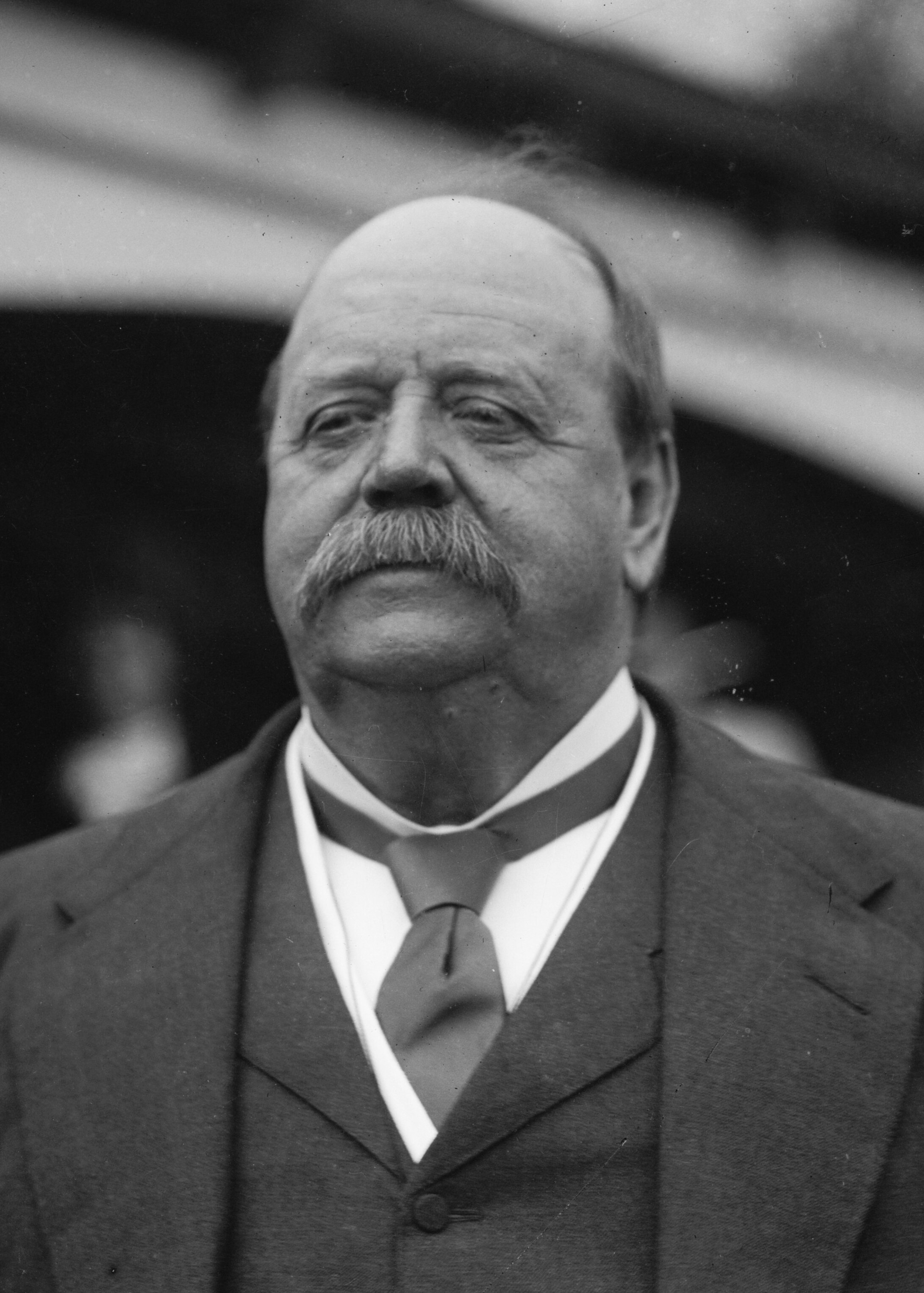

In office
- 18 August 1904 – 5 July 1905
- Monarch: Edward VII
- Prime Minister: George Reid
- Party: Free Trade
- Status: Minority (Protectionist support)
- Origin: Predecessor lost confidence motion
- Demise: Lost confidence motion
- Predecessor: Watson government
- Successor: Deakin government (II)

The Reid government refers to the period of federal executive government of Australia led by Prime Minister George Reid. It lasted from 18 August 1904 to 5 July 1905. Reid was the only Prime Minister of Australia to belong to the Free Trade Party. Allan McLean of the Protectionist Party held the second rank in cabinet and the government was also referred to as the Reid–McLean government.

== Background ==
George Reid led the Free Trade Party and was Opposition Leader for 6 of the Australian Parliament's first 7 years of existence. The major issue of the first General Election of 1901 was to be whether or not Australia would be established as a Protectionist or Free Trade nation. Prior to Federation, the Colony of Victoria had settled on Protectionism, while New South Wales had favoured Free Trade. In the absence of strong party affiliations outside the Australian Labour Party (which was divided on the question), candidates tended to be defined in relation to their attitude to trade, and while Barton sought compromise, the Free Trader George Reid pushed for the question to be a central election issue.

Following the March election, Barton's Protectionists won 27 seats in the newly formed 75 member Australian House of Representatives. Reid's Free Trade supporters won 32 seats, leaving the Labour Party, on 16 seats, with the balance of power. Labour confirmed "support in return for concessions" and backed Barton, who became prime minister in a minority government. The 36 seat Senate meanwhile held just 14 Senators declaring themselves in support of the Barton government.. The Deakin government (1903-1904) and Watson government followed the Barton government.

The Watson government governed from 27 April 1904 to 18 August 1904 and was the first Labor Party national government in both Australia and in the world. Chris Watson commanded a majority in neither the House of Representatives, nor the Senate. Amid the volatile environment of early Federation Australian politics, the Watson government passed just six bills. Other than an amended Acts Interpretation Act 1904, these were all money bills, however, Watson advanced the landmark Conciliation and Arbitration Bill, passed later in 1904 by the Reid government.

== Government formation and ministry ==
Reid was appointed prime minister on 18 August 1904, six days after the Watson government was defeated by 36 votes to 34 on a confidence motion. Watson attempted to call an early election but was refused a dissolution by Governor-General Lord Northcote.

Reid was reliant on the support of Deakin and the Protectionists for his continuation in office, holding a minority in both houses of parliament. Deakin would not support a formal coalition or merger, but gave approval for four Protectionists to join Reid's ministry. Former Victorian premier Allan McLean was the most senior Protectionist to take a portfolio and was given the second rank in cabinet, with the administration becoming known as the Reid–McLean government. Reid was forced to exclude several Free Traders from the cabinet, although it had considerable ministerial experience with McLean and George Turner also being former premiers. The formation of the government led to a split in the Protectionists, with around half supporting the government and the other half – led by Littleton Groom and Isaac Isaacs – joining the Labor Party on the opposition benches.

== Legislation ==
The below significant legislation was passed by the Reid government:

- Conciliation and Arbitration Act 1904: created the Commonwealth Court of Conciliation and Arbitration as a means of resolving industrial disputes
- Defence Act 1904: amended the hastily passed Defence Act 1903 to create the Military Board, chaired by the defence minister but ultimately responsible to parliament
- Sea-Carriage of Goods Act 1904: defined shipping companies as common carriers, closing a loophole that allowed them to escape contractual liabilities to Australian export firms

== In office ==
Reid's government continued the early work of establishing the legislative frameworks of the newly formed Australian Federation. George Reid led the Free Trade Party and was sworn in as prime minister on 18 August 1904, replacing the Watson government. Reid governed in shaky coalition with the Protectionists, and his government lasted until July 1905.

Reid denounced the Labour Party as the "Socialist tiger". Watson encouraged Alfred Deakin to abandon the Free Traders, saying: "We, and especially me, don't want office, but I have the utmost anxiety to stop the retrogressive movement which Reid is heading." Deakin commenced his second term as prime minister in July 1905, with Labour's support

Reid renamed his Free Trade Party to the Anti-Socialist Party prior to the 1906 election, in an attempt to create a party system based on a spectrum running from socialist to anti-socialist.

== Aftermath ==
The Reid government was succeeded by the Deakin government (1905-1908).

== See also ==
- History of Australia
- History of Australia (1901–45)

== Bibliography ==
- Richardson, Charles (25 January 2009). "Fusion: The Party System We Had To Have?" (PDF). Policy. 25 (1). Centre for Independent Studies: 13–19.
- Crisp, L. F. (1979). George Houstoun Reid: Federation Father, Federal Failure?. ANU Press. ISBN 090959631X.
- Gorman, Zachary (2015). "George Reid's anti-socialist campaign in the evolution of Australian liberalism". In Melleuish, G. C. (ed.). Liberalism and Conservatism. Connor Court. pp. 17–38. ISBN 9781925138597.
- Headon, David (2020). George Houstoun Reid (1845–1918) Australia's Fourth Prime Minister: Forgotten Founder (PDF). Australian Parliamentary Library. ISBN 9780987576460.
- McMinn, W. G. (1989). George Reid. Carlton, Vic: Melbourne University Press. ISBN 0-522-84373-5.
