= Watson government =

Australian Government led by Chris Watson

Watson government

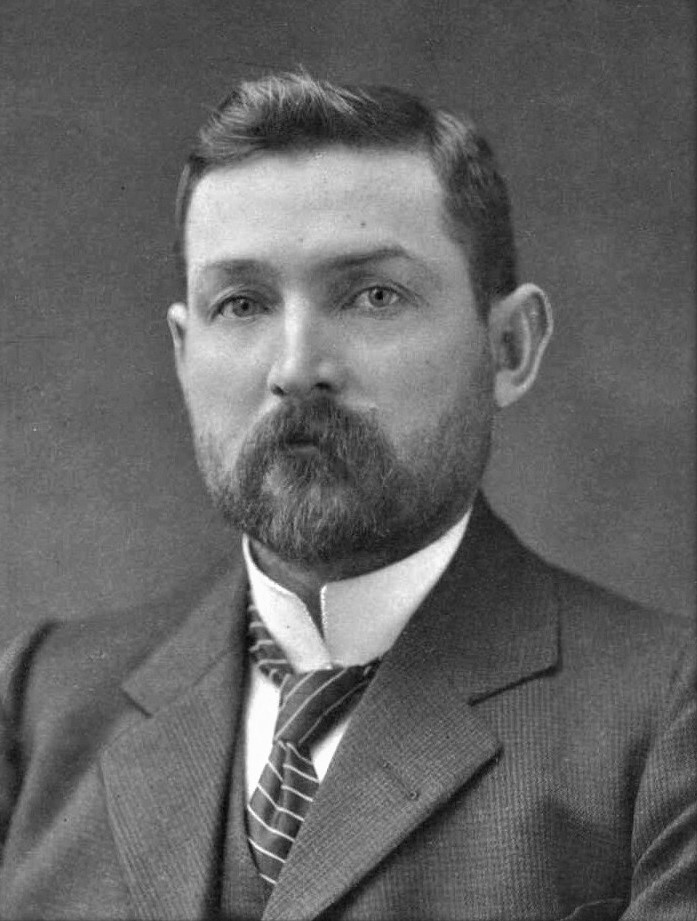

In office
- 27 April 1904 – 18 August 1904
- Monarch: Edward VII
- Prime Minister: Chris Watson
- Party: Labor
- Status: Minority (Protectionist support)
- Origin: Predecessor lost confidence motion
- Demise: Lost confidence motion
- Predecessor: Deakin government (I)
- Successor: Reid government

The Watson government was the third federal executive government of the Commonwealth of Australia. It was led by Prime Minister Chris Watson of the Australian Labor Party from 27 April 1904 to 18 August 1904. The Watson government was the first Labor Party national government in both Australia and in the world. Watson was aged just 37 when he became Prime Minister of Australia, and remains the youngest person to have held the post.

== Background ==
The Australian Federal Parliament had come into being with the Federation of Britain's Australian colonies in 1901. Edmund Barton's Protectionists held power in coalition with Labour, until Barton was succeeded by Alfred Deakin. The short-lived first Deakin government failed to pass any legislation in the fledgling Australian Federal Parliament, and its shaky coalition with the Labour Party did not long survive the December 1903 Election. By the resumption of Parliament in March 1904, the Deakin government had fallen, amid a dispute over a Labour Party amendment to the Conciliation and Arbitration Bill.

Under Watson, Labour had adopted a policy of support for the Barton and Deakin governments in return for concessions. However, the response of the conservative Victorian government to a railway strike led Federal Labour to stridently pursue inclusion of state public servants within the ambit of the Conciliation and Arbitration Bill, which Deakin was reluctant to accept. Labour made gains at the 1903 Election, and when Deakin sought to reintroduce his Bill following the election, the Labour amendment was again carried, leading Deakin to resign.

== Chris Watson ==
John Christian (Chris) Watson (1867–1941) was a trade unionist, company director, and politician who led Australia's—and the world's—first Labor national government.

Watson left school aged ten, worked as an assistant railway construction worker, farm hand, stable hand and compositor before becoming heavily involved in trade union politics. He was elected to the Trades and Labour Council in 1890, and the following year became involved with the newly formed Labor Party, entering the NSW Parliament as a Labour MP in 1894. He was active in arguing the Labour case for Federation, and joined Labor's opposition to the Australian Constitution put to referendum in the 1890s, though accepted the majority vote once obtained.

Watson entered the new Federal Parliament as Member for Bland, and at the first meeting of the Federal Parliamentary Labor Party in May 1901, he was elected leader. Through the first decade of Federation, Labour, the Protectionists and Free Traders were unable to secure majorities and were forced to govern in coalitions. Watson was aged just 37 when he became Prime Minister of Australia, and remains the youngest person to hold the post. McMullin wrote of Watson that "in that era of intractable parliamentary unwieldiness, his party had to pursue its objectives in concert with non-Labor MPs, and Watson's amiable personality was an important factor in Labor's capacity to negotiate desirable outcomes."

== Ministry ==
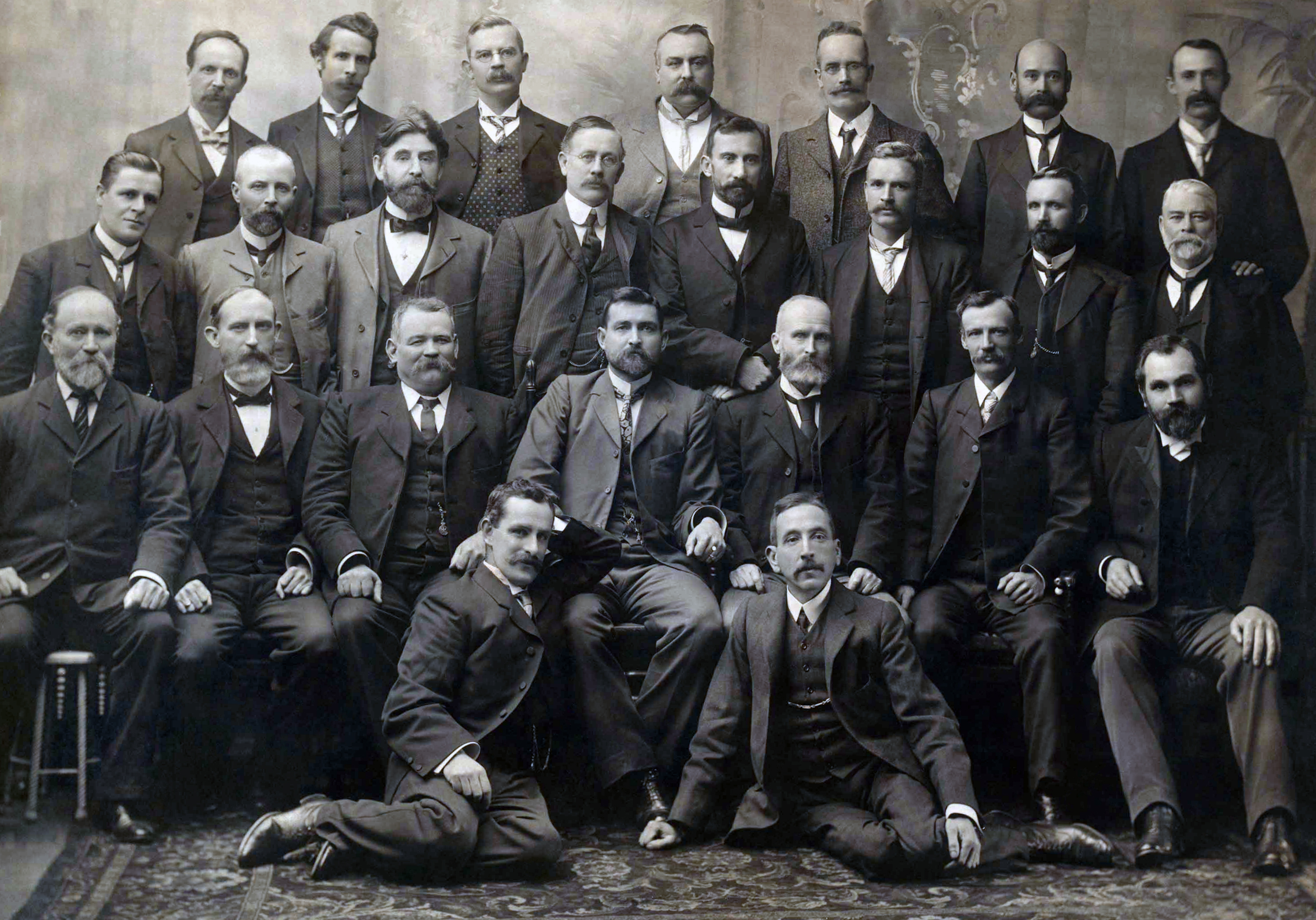
Group photograph of all Federal Labour Party MPs elected at the inaugural 1901 election, including Chris Watson, Andrew Fisher, Billy Hughes, and Frank Tudor

The Watson Ministry was the third Australian Commonwealth ministry, and ran from 27 April 1904 to 17 August 1904. It was the first federal ministry formed by the Australian Labor Party.

Watson became Treasurer, and gave External Affairs to Billy Hughes. Home Affairs went to Egerton Batchelor, and Trade and Customs to Andrew Fisher. Anderson Dawson became Minister for Defence and Hugh Mahon was appointed Postmaster-General. The portfolio of Attorney General went to H. B. Higgins, a pro-Labour Protectionist, Labour having no qualified barristers among their ranks.

== Term of office ==
Watson commanded a majority in neither the House of Representatives, nor the Senate. Many Australian conservatives greeted the arrival of a Labour government with fear. Deakin promised "the utmost fair play" to allow the new government to operate, but his Protectionist Party was too divided to agree to serve in a Labour led alliance. Watson soon admitted to "despair", and when his government lost a vote on an amendment to the Conciliation and Arbitration Bill regarding unionists, Watson resigned.

Amid the volatile environment of early Federation Australian politics, the Watson government passed just six bills. Other than an amended Acts Interpretation Act 1904, these were all money bills, however, Watson advanced the landmark Conciliation and Arbitration Bill, passed later in 1904 by the Reid government.

== Aftermath ==
George Reid of the Free Trade Party was sworn in as prime minister on 18 August, and Watson returned to negotiations with the liberal wing of the Protectionists. Reid governed in shaky coalition with the Protectionists, and his government lasted until July 1905. Reid denounced Labour as the "Socialist tiger". Watson encouraged Deakin to abandon the Free Traders, saying: "We, and especially me, don't want office, but I have the utmost anxiety to stop the retrogressive movement which Reid is heading." Deakin commenced his second term as prime minister in July 1905, with Labour's support.

Reid adopted a strategy of trying to reorient the party system along Labour vs non-Labour lines – prior to the 1906 election, he renamed his Free Trade Party to the Anti-Socialist Party. Reid envisaged a spectrum running from socialist to anti-socialist, with the Protectionists in the middle. This attempt struck a chord with politicians who were steeped in the Westminster tradition and regarded a two-party system as very much the norm.

== See also ==
- History of Australia
- History of Australia (1901–45)
