= Deakin government (1905–1908) =

Deakin government (II)

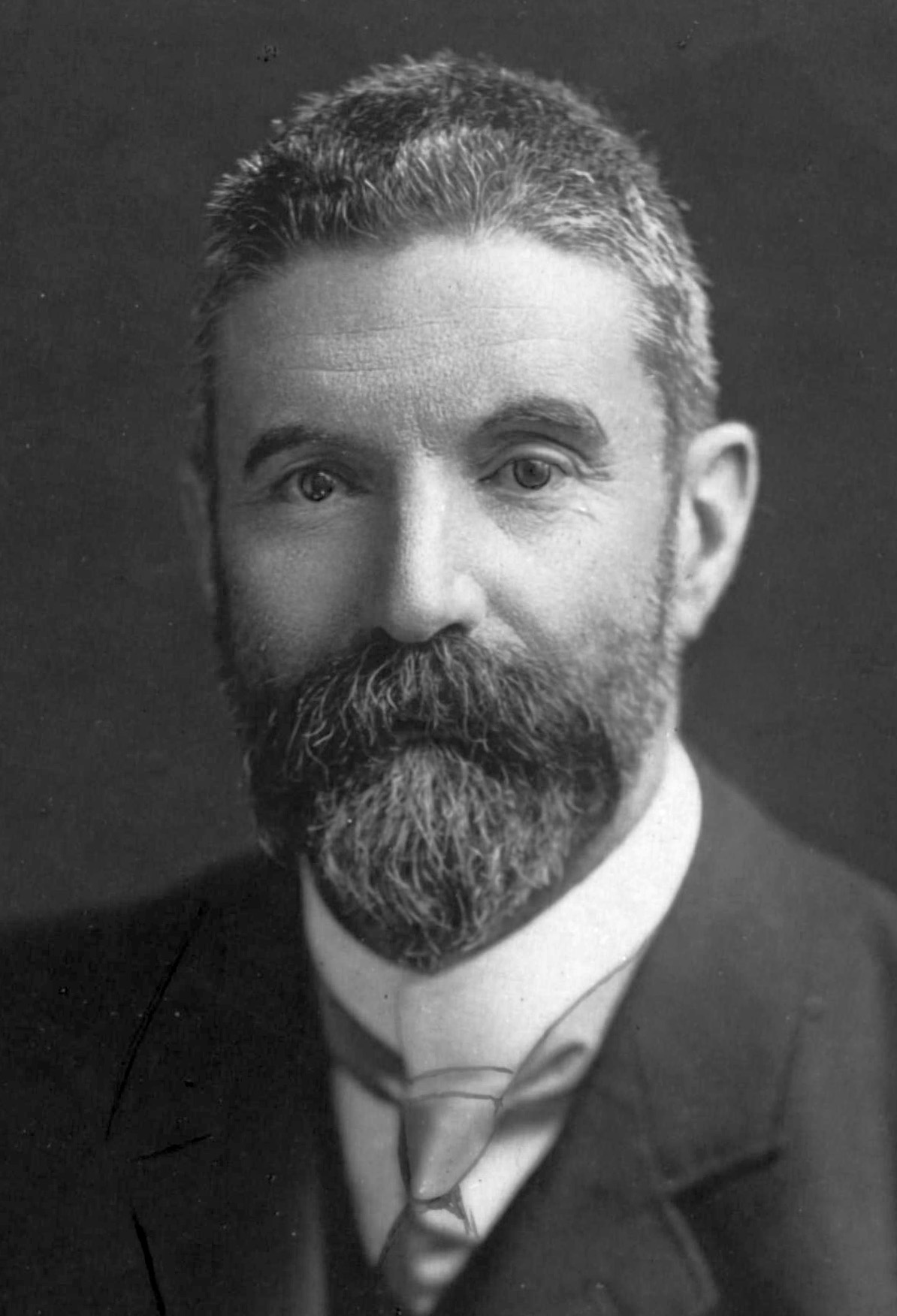

In office
- 5 July 1905 – 13 November 1908
- Monarch: Edward VII
- Prime Minister: Alfred Deakin
- Party: Protectionist
- Status: Minority (Labor support)
- Origin: Predecessor lost confidence motion
- Demise: Lost confidence motion
- Predecessor: Reid government
- Successor: Fisher government (I)

The second Deakin government was the period of federal executive government of Australia led by Prime Minister Alfred Deakin. It lasted from 5 July 1905 to 13 November 1908. Deakin was the second prime minister of Australia, having previously led the Deakin government (1903–1904), and held the office again in 1909–1910.

== Alfred Deakin ==
Alfred Deakin (1856–1919) – a barrister, journalist and important Federation era politician – was born in Melbourne in 1856. He first entered the Victorian Parliament as a Liberal in 1879. He attended all the official federal conferences and conventions working towards federation of Britain's Australian colonies, and was skilled at brokering compromises. He played a significant part in shaping the Australian Constitution, and arguing the case for unity of the colonies.

Edmund Barton (left), the first Prime Minister of Australia, with Alfred Deakin, the second Prime Minister.

Deakin was a fine orator and major player in the establishment of the institutions of Australian democracy, and served three times in the office of prime minister during the first ten years after Australia's federation.

== Background ==
Alfred Deakin first became prime minister after Edmund Barton resigned to become a judge on the first High Court of Australia. The first Deakin government passed several pieces of legislation, although its legislative achievements were limited. The Protectionists' shaky coalition with the Australian Labor Party did not long survive the December 1903 election, and by the resumption of Parliament in March 1904, the Deakin government had fallen, amid a dispute over a Labor Party amendment to the Conciliation and Arbitration Bill.

The early years of Federation saw a volatile political environment. The first Deakin government ended on 27 April 1904, making way for the first Australian Labor Party government of Australia, led by Chris Watson. In August that year, the Protectionists split with radical liberals, Isaac Isaacs and William Lyne, aligning with the Labor Party against the Free Trade Party of George Reid.

The Reid government lasted from 18 August 1904 – 5 July 1905. Reid campaigned against the Labor Party using the slogan "The Socialist Tiger". Watson encouraged Alfred Deakin to abandon the Free Traders, saying: "We, and especially me, don't want office, but I have the utmost anxiety to stop the retrogressive movement which Reid is heading." Deakin commenced his second term as prime minister in July 1905, with Labour's support.

== In office ==
- New Protection – made government support of Australian industries contingent on payment of a "fair and reasonable wage", later defined in the Harvester Judgment
- Papua Act 1905 – formal acceptance of administration of British New Guinea and establishment of Territory of Papua
- Judiciary Act 1906 – addition of two additional judges to the High Court
- 1906 Australian Senate elections referendum (passed in every state and with 82.65% nationwide)
- Quarantine Act 1908

== See also ==
- History of Australia
- History of Australia (1901–45)
