= Deakin government (1903–1904) =

Deakin government (I)

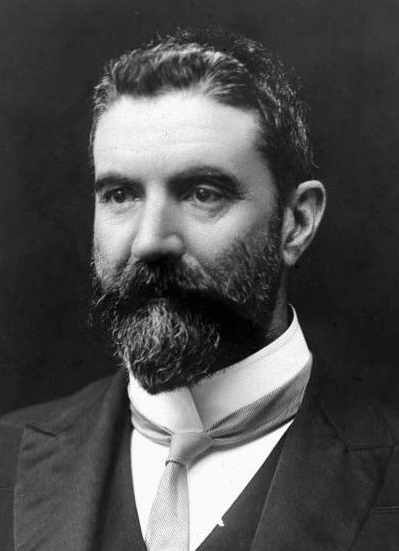

In office
- 24 September 1903 – 27 April 1904
- Monarch: Edward VII
- Prime Minister: Alfred Deakin
- Party: Protectionist
- Status: Minority (Labor support)
- Origin: Retirement of Edmund Barton
- Demise: Lost confidence motion
- Predecessor: Barton government
- Successor: Watson government

The First Deakin government was the second federal executive government of the Commonwealth of Australia. It was led by Prime Minister Alfred Deakin, from 24 September 1903 until 27 April 1904. Deakin was the second Prime Minister of Australia, but served as Prime Minister again from 1905–1908 and 1909–1910 – see Second Deakin government and Third Deakin government.

== Background ==
The Commonwealth of Australia came into being when the Federal Constitution was proclaimed by the Governor-General, Lord Hopetoun, on 1 January 1901. The first Federal elections were held in March 1901 and resulted in a narrow plurality for the Protectionist Party over the Free Trade Party with the Australian Labor Party (ALP) polling third. Labor declared it would offer support to the party which offered concessions and Edmund Barton's Protectionists formed a government, with Alfred Deakin as Attorney-General.

== Alfred Deakin ==
Edmund Barton (left), the first Prime Minister of Australia, with Alfred Deakin, the second Prime Minister.

Alfred Deakin (1856–1919) – a barrister, journalist and important Federation era politician – was born in Melbourne in 1856. He first entered the Victorian Parliament as a Liberal in 1879. He attended all the official Federal conferences and conventions working towards federation of Britain's Australian colonies, and was skilled at brokering compromises. He played a significant part in shaping the Australian Constitution, and arguing the case for unity of the colonies.

Deakin was a fine orator and major player in the establishment of the institutions of Australian democracy, and served three times in the office of Prime Minister during the first ten years of Australia's Federation.

== Term of office ==
Alfred Deakin became Prime Minister after Edmund Barton resigned to become a judge on the first High Court of Australia. In the First Deakin Ministry, Deakin also took up the post of Minister for External Affairs, while James Drake became Attorney General and George Turner was appointed Treasurer. Austin Chapman became Minister for Defence, and William Lyne took (Trade and Customs).

The first Deakin government failed to pass any legislation in the newly formed Australian Federal Parliament. The Protectionists' shaky coalition with the Australian Labor Party did not long survive the December 1903 Election, and by the resumption of Parliament in March 1904, the Deakin government had fallen, amid a dispute over a Labor Party amendment to the Conciliation and Arbitration Bill.

== Aftermath ==
The early years of Federation saw a volatile political environment. The first Deakin government ended on 27 April 1904, making way for the first Australian Labor Party government of Australia, led by Chris Watson. In August that year, the Protectionists split with radical liberals, Isaac Isaacs and William Lyne, aligning with the Labor Party against the Free Trade Party of George Reid.

== See also ==
- History of Australia
