= History of Australia (1901–1945) =

The history of Australia from 1901 to 1945 begins with the federation of the six colonies to create the Commonwealth of Australia. The young nation joined Britain in the First World War, suffered through the Great Depression in Australia as part of the global Great Depression and again joined Britain in the Second World War against Nazi Germany in 1939. Imperial Japan launched air raids and submarine raids against Australian cities during the Pacific War.

== From federation to war (1901—1914) ==
=== White Australia, protectionism and rise of Labor ===
Edmund Barton (left), the first Prime Minister of Australia, with Alfred Deakin, the second Prime Minister

The Commonwealth of Australia was proclaimed by the Governor-General, Lord Hopetoun on 1 January 1901. Edmund Barton was sworn in as Australia's first prime minister. The new Commonwealth was a federation of the six former British colonies of Australia, which now became states. The new constitution established a federal government with defined powers, among the most important of which were external affairs, defence, immigration, taxation, race and customs and excise.

The first federal elections were held in March 1901 and resulted in a narrow plurality for the Protectionist Party over the Free Trade Party. The Australian Labor Party (ALP) polled third. The ALP declared it would support the party which offered concessions to its program, and Barton's protectionists formed a government, with Deakin as Attorney-General.

The Immigration Restriction Act 1901 was one of the first laws passed by the new Australian parliament. This centrepiece of the White Australia policy aimed to extend the restrictions on the immigration of Asians that had previously been enacted by the colonies. Like the colonial legislation, the Immigration Restriction Act 1901 used a dictation test in a European language to exclude Asian migrants, who were considered a threat to Australia's living standards and majority British culture. The government also ended the use of indentured South Sea Islander labour in the Queensland sugar cane industry and announced that the workers would be repatriated to their islands by 1906. Deakin stated that White Australia, "is not a surface, but a reasoned policy which goes to the roots of national life, and by which the whole of our social, industrial and political organisation is governed."

In 1902 the government introduced female suffrage in the Commonwealth jurisdiction, but at the same time excluded Aboriginal people from the franchise unless they already had the vote in a state jurisdiction.

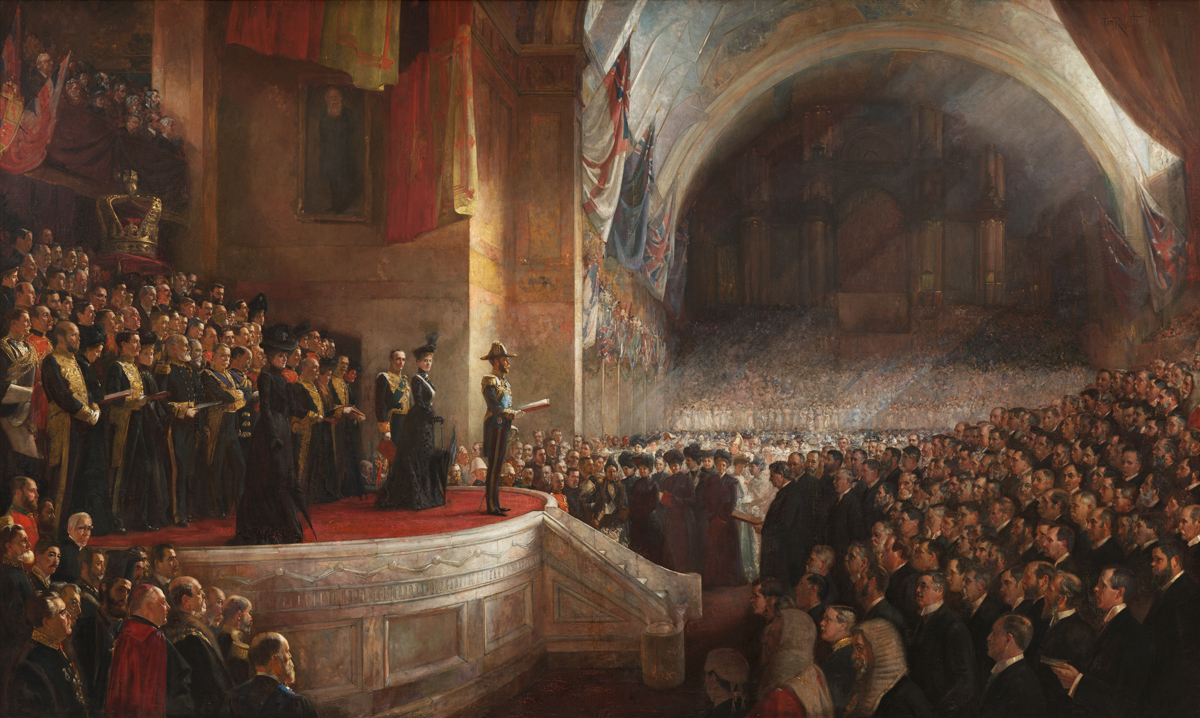
Opening of the first Parliament of Australia in 1901.

The Barton government also introduced a tariff on imports designed to raise revenue and protect Australian industry. However, the tariff was lower and less extensive than many protectionists wanted due to the need to attract sufficient support from Labor parliamentarians, who had a free vote on the issue and many of whom favoured free trade.

The three major parties all supported a system of Commonwealth conciliation and arbitration to settle industrial disputes extending across state borders, but Labor insisted that railway workers should be included in the system and preference be given to unionised labour. Disagreements about the legislation were instrumental in the fall of Deakin's Protectionist government in April 1904 and the appointment of the first national Labor government under prime minister Chris Watson. The Watson government itself fell in April and a Free Trade government under prime minister Reid successfully introduced legislation for a Commonwealth Conciliation and Arbitration Court.

In July 1905 Deakin withdrew his support for the Reid government and again formed a Protectionist government with the support of Labor. The new government embarked on a series of social reforms and a program dubbed the New Protection under which tariff protection for Australian industries would be linked to their provision of "fair and reasonable" wages. In the Harvester case of 1907, H. B. Higgins of the Conciliation and Arbitration Court set a fair and reasonable wage based on the needs of a male breadwinner supporting a wife and three children. In 1908, the High Court of Australia struck down the New Protection legislation as unconstitutional in R v Barger.

=== Labour issues and Labor Party ===
The Harvester case of 1907 set a standard for a basic wage which was subsequently used by the Conciliation and Arbitration Court when settling industrial disputes. By 1914 the Commonwealth, New South Wales, Queensland and Western Australia used arbitration courts to settle industrial disputes and fix wages and conditions, while Victoria, South Australia and Tasmania used wage boards to achieve the same goals.

The base of the Labor Party was the Australian Trade Union movement which grew from under 100,000 members in 1901 to more than half a million in 1914. The party also drew considerable support from clerical workers, Catholics and small farmers. In 1905 the Labor party adopted objectives at the federal level which included the "cultivation of an Australian sentiment based upon the maintenance of racial purity" and "the collective ownership of monopolies". In the same year, the Queensland branch of the party adopted an overtly socialist objective.

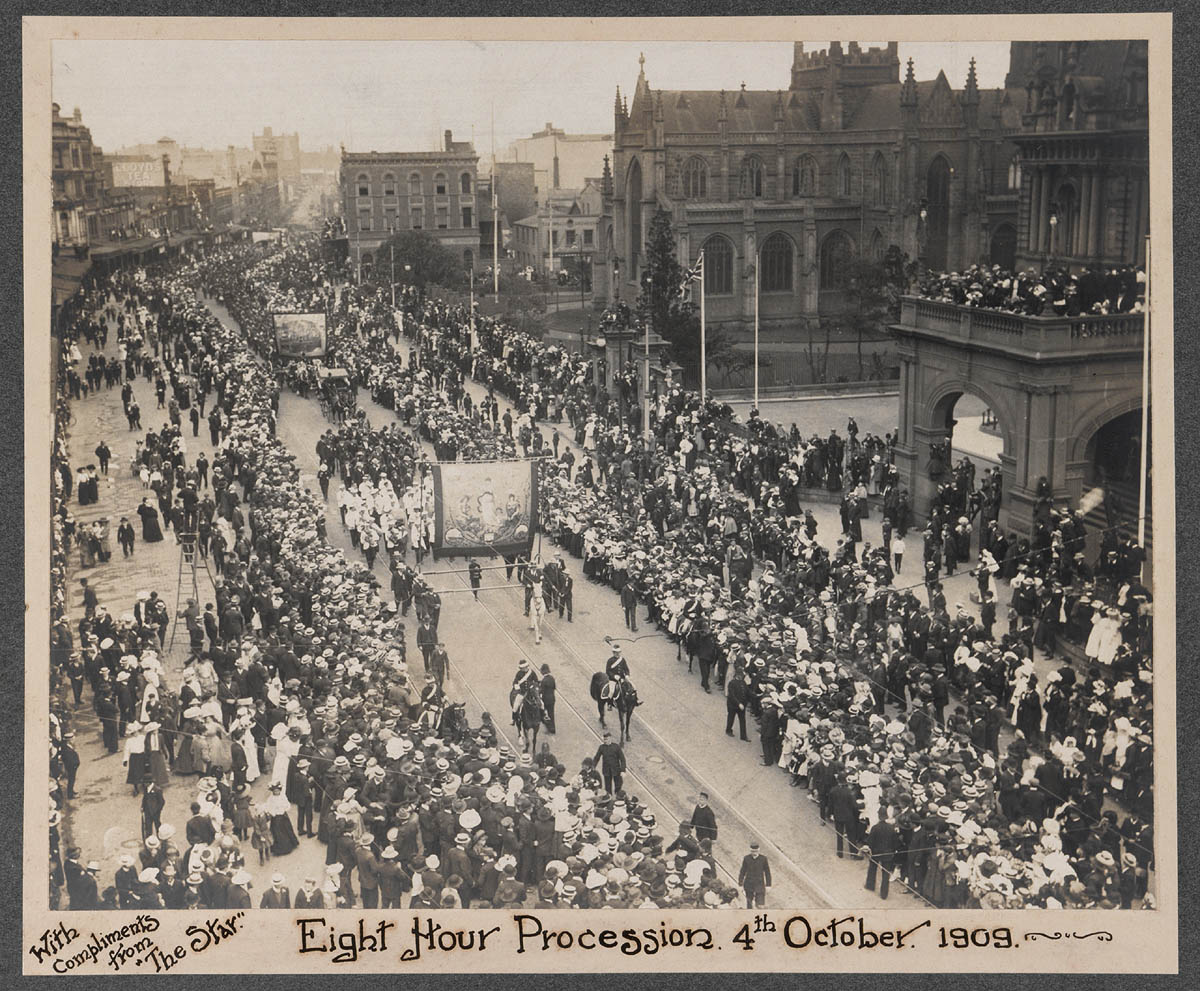
Procession in support of an eight-hour work day, 4 October 1909.

In 1906 the federal Free Trade Party changed its name to the Anti-Socialist Party to emphasize its pro-business policies. In the December 1906 elections it became the gained 38 per cent of the vote, compared with 37 per cent for Labor and 21 per cent for the Protectionists. Deakin's Protectionist government remained in power, but following the passage of legislation for old age pensions and a new protective tariff in 1908, Labor withdrew its support for the government and, in November, Andrew Fisher became the second Labor prime minister. In response, the Liberal-Protectionists, Anti-Socialists and conservative "Corner" group entered into a coalition known as the Fusion which formed a government under prime minister Deakin in June 1909. Reid stated that the question was whether Australia should follow a course of free enterprise or state control.

In the elections of May 1910, Labor won a majority in both houses of parliament and Fisher again became prime minister. The Labor government introduced a series of reforms including a progressive land tax (1910), invalid pensions (1910) and a maternity allowance (1912). The government established the Commonwealth Bank (1911) but referendums to nationalise monopolies and extend Commonwealth trade and commerce powers were defeated in 1911 and 1913. The Commonwealth took over responsibility for the Northern Territory from South Australia in 1911.

The anti-Labor parliamentary fusion was formalised as the Commonwealth Liberal Party under the former New South Wales Labor Party leader Joseph Cook. The Liberal Party narrowly won the May 1913 elections but Labor still controlled the Senate. The Cook government's attempt to pass legislation abolishing preferential treatment for union members in the Commonwealth Public Service triggered a double dissolution of parliament. Labor comfortably won the September 1914 elections and Fisher resumed office.

=== External affairs and defence ===
With federation, the Commonwealth inherited the small defence forces of the six former Australian colonies. By 1901, soldiers from all six Australian colonies had been active as part of British forces in the Boer War. When the British government asked for more troops from Australia in early 1902, the Australian government obliged with a national contingent. Some 16,500 men had volunteered for service by the war's end in June 1902.

In 1884 Britain and Germany had agreed to partition the eastern half of New Guinea. In 1902 British New Guinea was placed under the authority of Australia which saw the territory as vital for the protection of shipping lanes. With the passage of the Papua Act 1905, British New Guinea became the Australian Territory of Papua. Formal Australian administration of the territory began in 1906.

Under a 1902 agreement, Australia contributed to the cost of a Royal Navy Pacific fleet to provide for the nation's defence, but Britain reserved the right to deploy the fleet outside Australian waters. Following Japan's defeat of Russia in the 1904–05 war, concern about Japanese naval power led to calls for an Australian fleet. Deakin proposed the purchase of destroyers in 1906 and his government's Surplus Revenue Act 1908 provided £250,000 for naval expenditure. The Fisher Labor government increased the naval budget and in 1911 established the Royal Australian Navy. In October 1913 the navy's first battle cruiser, Australia, arrived in Sydney harbour, accompanied by the new light cruisers Sydney and Melbourne.

In 1907 Deakin proposed compulsory military training for home defence, a measure that was supported by Watson and Hughes of the Labor party. The Labor party adopted the measure at its 1908 annual conference and in 1911 the Fisher government expanded the system of compulsory military training which had been introduced by the Deakin government the previous year. Defence expenditure increased from £1 million in 1908–09 to £4.3 million in 1913–14, when it accounted for a third of the Commonwealth budget.

=== Economy and population ===
The breaking of the Federation Drought in 1903 heralded a period of strong economic growth. The economy grew by 75 per cent in the fourteen years to the outbreak of the First World War, with pastoralism, construction, manufacturing and government services leading the way. Rural industries were still the major employer (accounting for a quarter of all jobs) but manufacturing was fast catching up. While employment grew by 30 per cent during the period, employment in manufacturing increased by almost 70 per cent.

The Australian population also grew strongly, driven by a fall in infant mortality, increasing adult life expectancy, and a revival in state-subsidised immigration. The population increased from four million in 1901 to five million in 1914. From 1910 to 1914 just under 300,000 migrants arrived, all white, and almost all from Britain.

== First World War ==
=== Australia at war 1914–18 ===
When the United Kingdom declared war on Germany on 4 August 1914, the declaration automatically involved all of Britain's colonies and dominions. The outbreak of war came in the middle of the 1914 federal election campaign during which Labor leader Andrew Fisher promised to defend Britain "to the last man and the last shilling." Both major parties offered Britain 20,000 Australian troops. As the Defence Act 1903 precluded sending conscripts overseas, a new volunteer force, the Australian Imperial Force (AIF), was raised to meet this commitment.

Public enthusiasm for the war was high, and the initial quota for the AIF was quickly filled. The troops left for Egypt on 1 November 1914, one of the escort ships, HMAS Sydney, sinking the German cruiser Emden along the way. Meanwhile, in September, a separate Australian expeditionary force had captured German New Guinea.

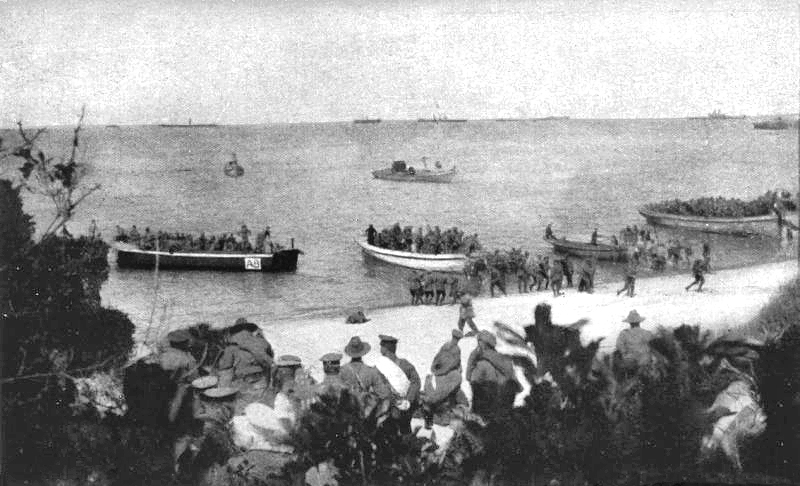
The Australian 4th Battalion lands at the Gallipoli Peninsula on 25 April 1915.

After arriving in Egypt, the AIF was incorporated into an Australian and New Zealand Army Corps (ANZAC) under the British general William Birdwood. The Anzacs formed part of the Mediterranean Expeditionary Force with the task of opening the Dardanelles to allied battleships, threatening Constantinople, the capital of the Ottoman Empire which had entered the war on the side of the Central Powers. The Anzacs, along with French, British and Indian troops, landed on the Gallipoli peninsula on 25 April 1915. The Australian and New Zealand position at Anzac Cove was vulnerable to attack and the troops suffered heavy losses in establishing a narrow beachhead. After it had become clear that the expeditionary force would be unable to achieve its objectives in the face of determined Turkish resistance, the Anzacs were evacuated in December, followed by the British and French in early January.

The Australians suffered about 8,000 deaths in the campaign. Australian war correspondents variously emphasised the bravery and fighting qualities of the Australians and the errors of their British commanders. By 1916, Australian servicemen were commemorating 25 April, and the date soon became an Australian national holiday known as Anzac Day, centring on themes of "nationhood, brotherhood and sacrifice".

In 1916, five infantry divisions of the AIF were sent to the Western Front. In July 1916, at Fromelles, in a diversionary attack during the Battle of the Somme, the AIF suffered 5,533 casualties in 24 hours, the most costly single encounter in Australian military history. Elsewhere on the Somme, 23,000 Australians were killed or wounded in seven weeks of attacks on German positions. In Spring 1917, as the Germans retreated to the Hindenburg Line, pursuing Australian troops engaged them at the First Battle of Bullecourt and the Second Battle of Bullecourt, suffering 10,000 casualties. In the summer and autumn of 1917, Australian troops also sustained heavy losses during the British offensive around Ypres. Overall, almost 22,000 Australian troops were killed in 1917.

In November 1917 the five Australian divisions were united in the Australian Corps, and in May 1918 the Australian general John Monash took over command. The Australian Corps was heavily involved in halting the German Spring Offensive of 1918 and in the allied counter-offensive of August that year. Constituting about one tenth of the British and dominion soldiers on the Western Front, the Australian Corps was responsible for more than 20 per cent of the territory reconquered, prisoners captured and field guns taken in the counter offensive.

In the Middle East, the Australian Light Horse brigades were prominent in halting the Ottoman and German threat to the Suez Canal at Romani in August 1916. In 1917, they participated in the allied advance through the Sinai Peninsula and into Palestine. This included a light horse mounted charge at Beersheba in October which helped win the Third Battle of Gaza. In 1918, they pressed on through Palestine and into Syria in an advance that led to the Ottoman surrender on 31 October.

By the time the war ended on 11 November 1918, 324,000 Australians had served overseas. Casualties included 60,000 dead and 150,000 wounded—the highest casualty rate of any allied force. Australian troops also had higher rates of unauthorised absence, crime and imprisonment than other allied forces.

=== The home front ===
Few Australians publicly opposed the war in 1914, and volunteers for the AIF outstripped the capacity to enlist and train them. There was also a surge in female participation in voluntary organisations such as the Red Cross and patriotic groups such as the One Woman, One Recruit League. Anti-German leagues were formed and 7,000 Germans and other "enemy aliens" were sent to internment camps during the war.

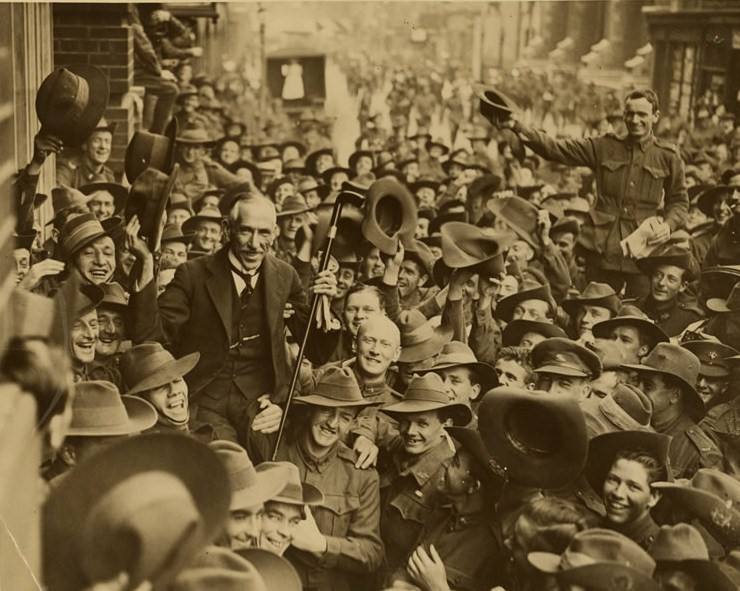
Australian soldiers carrying Prime Minister Billy Hughes, the 'little digger', down George Street, Sydney after his return from the Paris Peace Conference, 1919.

In October 1914, the Fisher Labor government introduced the War Precautions Act which gave it the power to make regulations "for securing the public safety and defence of the Commonwealth". After Billy Hughes replaced Fisher as prime minister in October 1915, regulations under the act were increasingly used to censor publications, penalise public speech and suppress organisations that the government considered detrimental to the war effort.

Business uncertainty, the enlistment of young male workers, and the disruption of shipping and export markets led to a decline in economic output. The economy contracted by 10 per cent during the course of hostilities. Inflation rose in the first two years of war and real wages fell. Soon after becoming prime minister, Hughes abandoned a promised referendum to give the Commonwealth the power to control prices, although the government later used its wartime powers to regulate the prices of some basic goods. Lower wages and perceptions of profiteering by some businesses led, in 1916, to a wave of strikes by miners, waterside workers and shearers.

Enlistments also declined, falling from 35,000 a month at its peak in 1915 to 6,000 a month in 1916. Hughes returned from a trip to England and the Western Front in July 1916 and narrowly won a Cabinet vote to hold a referendum on conscription for overseas service. In September the New South Wales Labor Party expelled Hughes on account of the issue. Following the narrow defeat of the October 1916 conscription referendum, the state branches of the Labor party began expelling other prominent pro-conscriptionists. In November, Hughes and 23 of his supporters left the parliamentary party, and in January 1917 they formed a new Nationalist government with the former opposition. The Nationalists comfortably won the May 1917 elections and Hughes continued as prime minister.

Political and industrial unrest intensified in 1917. From August to October there was a major strike of New South Wales railway, transport, waterside and coal workers which was defeated after the Commonwealth and New South Wales governments arrested strike leaders and organised special constables and non-union labour. The Industrial Workers of the World (IWW) was declared an unlawful organisation and more than 100 of its members were arrested. In September, protests by the Women's Peace Army in Melbourne resulted in extensive damage to shops and offices.

Following further falls in enlistments in 1917, Hughes announced a second referendum on conscription to be held in December. The referendum campaign proved divisive, with Hughes denouncing opponents of the measure as "the Germans of Australia, the Sinn Féin and the IWW." The Catholic archbishop of Melbourne, Daniel Mannix, and the Labor premier of Queensland T. J. Ryan were prominent campaigners against conscription. The referendum was defeated by a wider margin than in 1916. An April 1918 recruiting conference including representatives of the Commonwealth government, State governments, employers and labour leaders also failed to reach agreement on measures to increase troop numbers. Enlistments in 1918 were the lowest for the war, leading to the disbandment of 12 battalions and mutinies in the AIF.

Gerhard Fisher argues that the government aggressively promoted economic, industrial, and social modernisation in the war years. but at the cost of liberal-democratic values. Irish nationalists and labour radicals were under suspicion as well. Racist hostility was high against toward nonwhites, including Pacific Islanders, Chinese and Aborigines. The result, Fischer says, was a strengthening of conformity to imperial loyalties and an explicit preference for immigrants from the British Isles.

=== Paris Peace Conference, 1919 ===
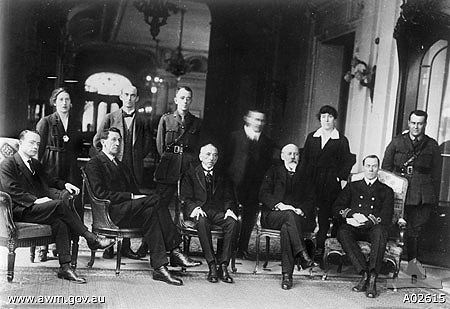
The Australian delegation. The centre is Prime Minister Billy Hughes.

Hughes attended the Imperial War Conference and Imperial War Cabinet in London from June 1918 where Australia, New Zealand, Canada and South Africa won British support for their separate representation at the eventual peace conference. At the Paris Peace Conference in 1919, Hughes argued that Germany should pay the full cost of the war, but ultimately gained only £5 million in war reparations for Australia. Australia and the other self-governing British dominions won the right to become full members of the new League of Nations, and Australia obtained a special League of Nations mandate over German New Guinea allowing Australia to control trade and immigration. Australia also gained a 42 per cent share of the formerly German-ruled island of Nauru, giving access to its rich superphosphate reserves. Australia argued successfully against a Japanese proposal for a racial equality clause in the League of Nations covenant, as Hughes feared that it would jeopardise the White Australia policy.

Although Japan was allowed to occupy the German territories north of the equator, Hughes was alarmed by this policy. Hughes frequently clashed with US president Woodrow Wilson at the conference, telling him: "I speak for 60,000 [Australian] dead". Nevertheless, as a signatory to the Treaty of Versailles and a full member of the League of Nations, Australia took an important step towards international recognition as a sovereign nation.

== The inter-war years ==
=== The 1920s ===
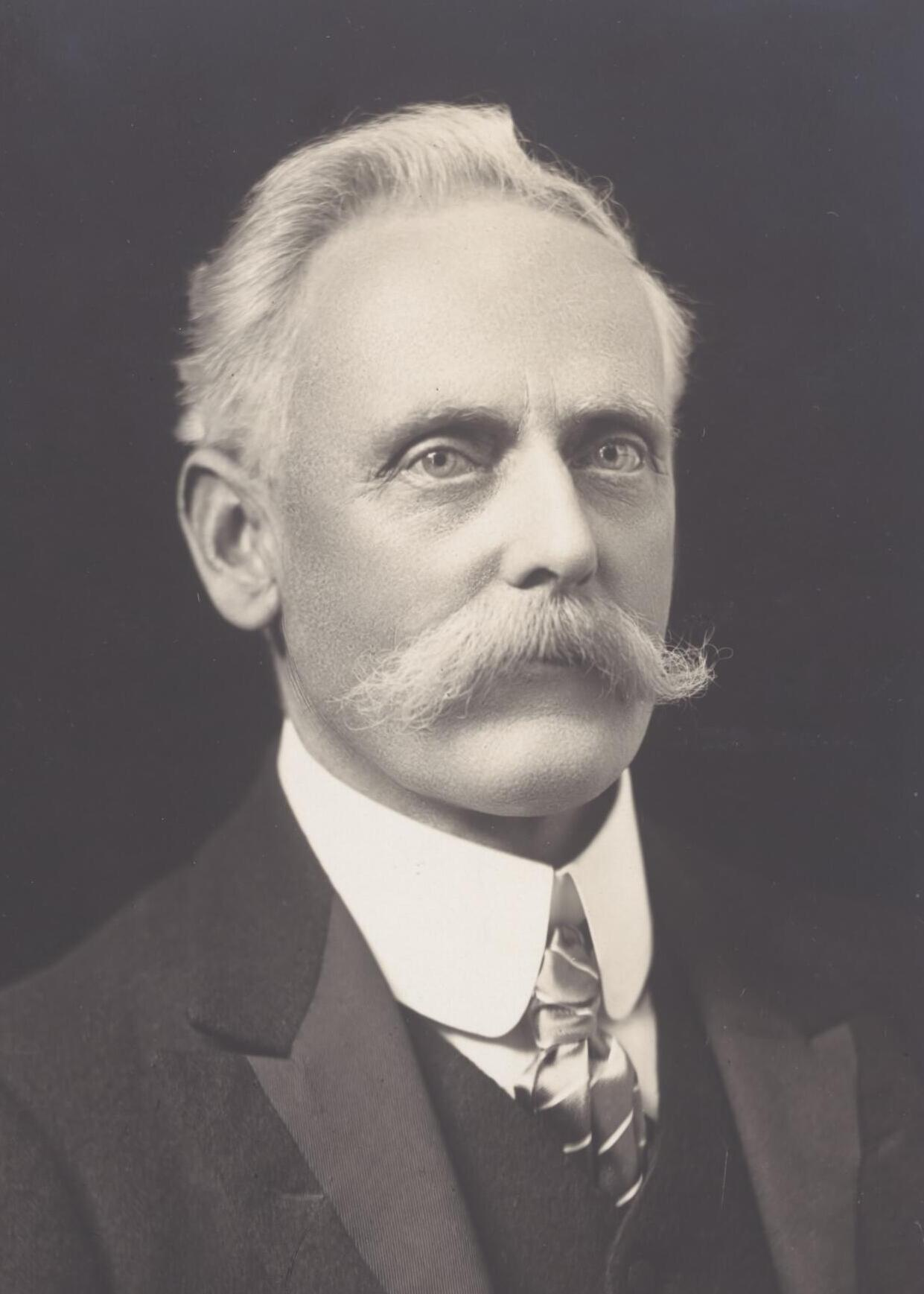
William McWilliams, Country Party (National) founder and leader 1920–1921.

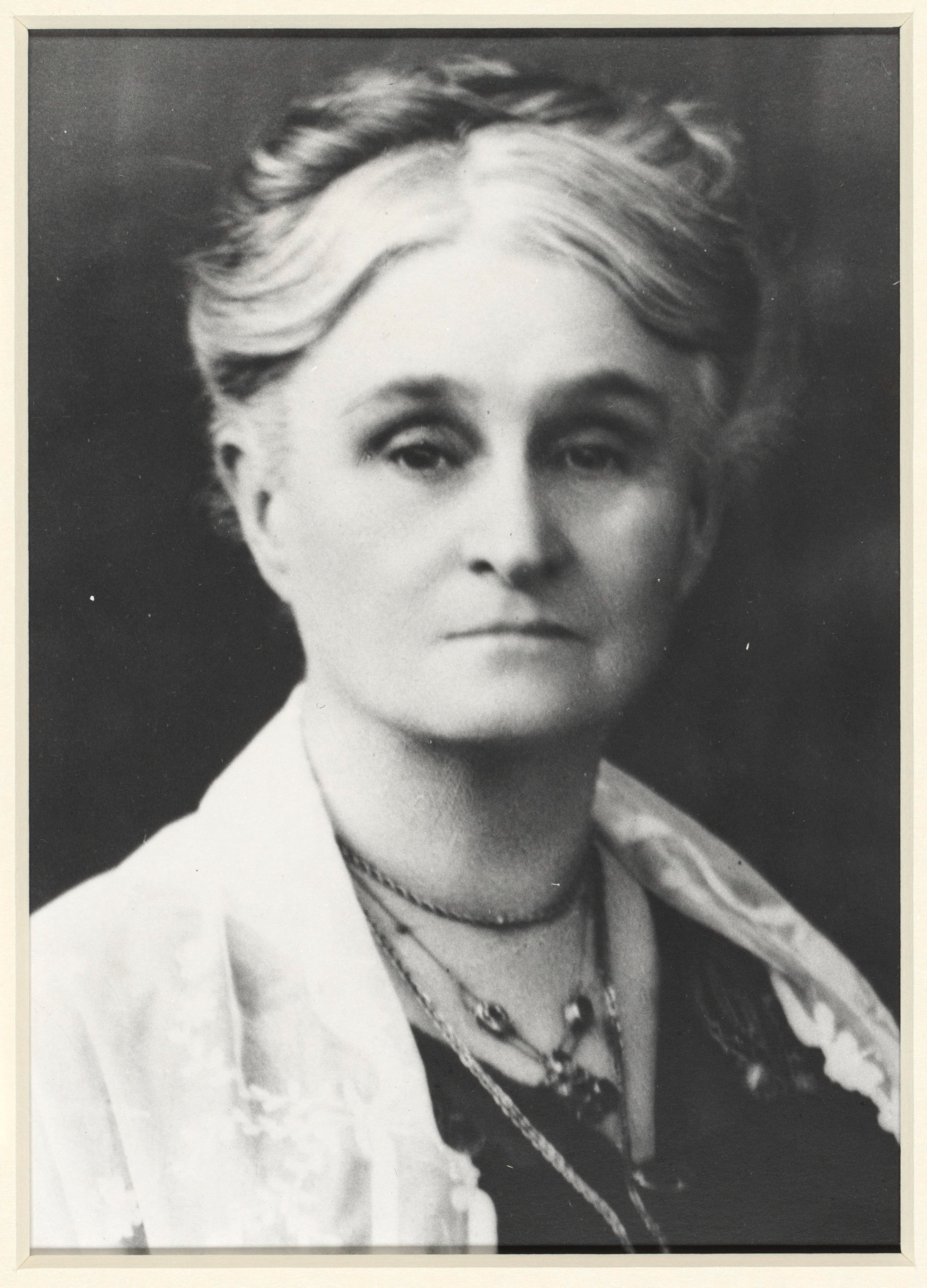
Edith Cowan (1861–1932) was elected to the West Australian Legislative Assembly in 1921 and was the first woman elected to any Australian Parliament.

After the war, Prime Minister Billy Hughes led a new conservative force, the Nationalist Party, formed from the old Liberal party and breakaway elements of Labor (of which he was the most prominent), after the deep and bitter split over Conscription. An estimated 12,000 Australians died as a result of the Spanish flu pandemic of 1919, brought home by returning soldiers.

The Country Party (today's National Party) formed in 1920 to promulgate its version of agrarianism, which it called "Countrymindedness". The goal was to enhance the status of the graziers (operators of big sheep ranches) and small farmers, and secure subsidies for them. Enduring longer than any other major party save the Labor party, it has generally operated in Coalition with the Liberal Party (since the 1940s), becoming a major party of government in Australia – particularly in Queensland.

Starting on 1 February 1927 (and lasting until 12 June 1931), the Northern Territory was divided into North Australia and Central Australia at latitude 20°S. New South Wales surrendered, namely Jervis Bay Territory comprising 6,677 hectares, in 1915. The external territories were added: Norfolk Island (1914); Ashmore Island, Cartier Islands (1931); the Australian Antarctic Territory transferred from Britain (1933); Heard Island, McDonald Islands, and Macquarie Island transferred to Australia from Britain (1947).

The Federal Capital Territory (FCT) was formed from New South Wales in 1911 to provide a location for the proposed new federal capital of Canberra (Melbourne was the seat of government from 1901 to 1927. The FCT was renamed the Australian Capital Territory (ACT) in 1938.) The Northern Territory was transferred from the control of the South Australian government to the Commonwealth in 1911.

==== Immigration and migrants ====
Stanley Bruce became prime minister in 1923, when members of the Nationalist Party Government voted to remove W.M. Hughes. Speaking in early 1925, Bruce summed up the priorities and optimism of many Australians, saying that "men, money and markets accurately defined the essential requirements of Australia" and that he was seeking such from Britain. The migration campaign of the 1920s, operated by the Development and Migration Commission, brought almost 300,000 Britons to Australia, although schemes to settle migrants and returned soldiers "on the land" were generally not a success. "The new irrigation areas in Western Australia and the Dawson Valley of Queensland proved disastrous".

==== International trade and finance ====
In Australia, the costs of major investment had traditionally been met by state and Federal governments and heavy borrowing from overseas was made by the governments in the 1920s. A Loan Council set up in 1928 to co-ordinate loans, three-quarters of which came from overseas. Despite Imperial Preference, a balance of trade was not successfully achieved with Britain. "In the five years from 1924... to... 1928, Australia bought 43.4% of its imports from Britain and sold 38.7% of its exports. Wheat and wool made up more than two-thirds of all Australian exports," a dangerous reliance on just two export commodities.

==== Transport and communication ====
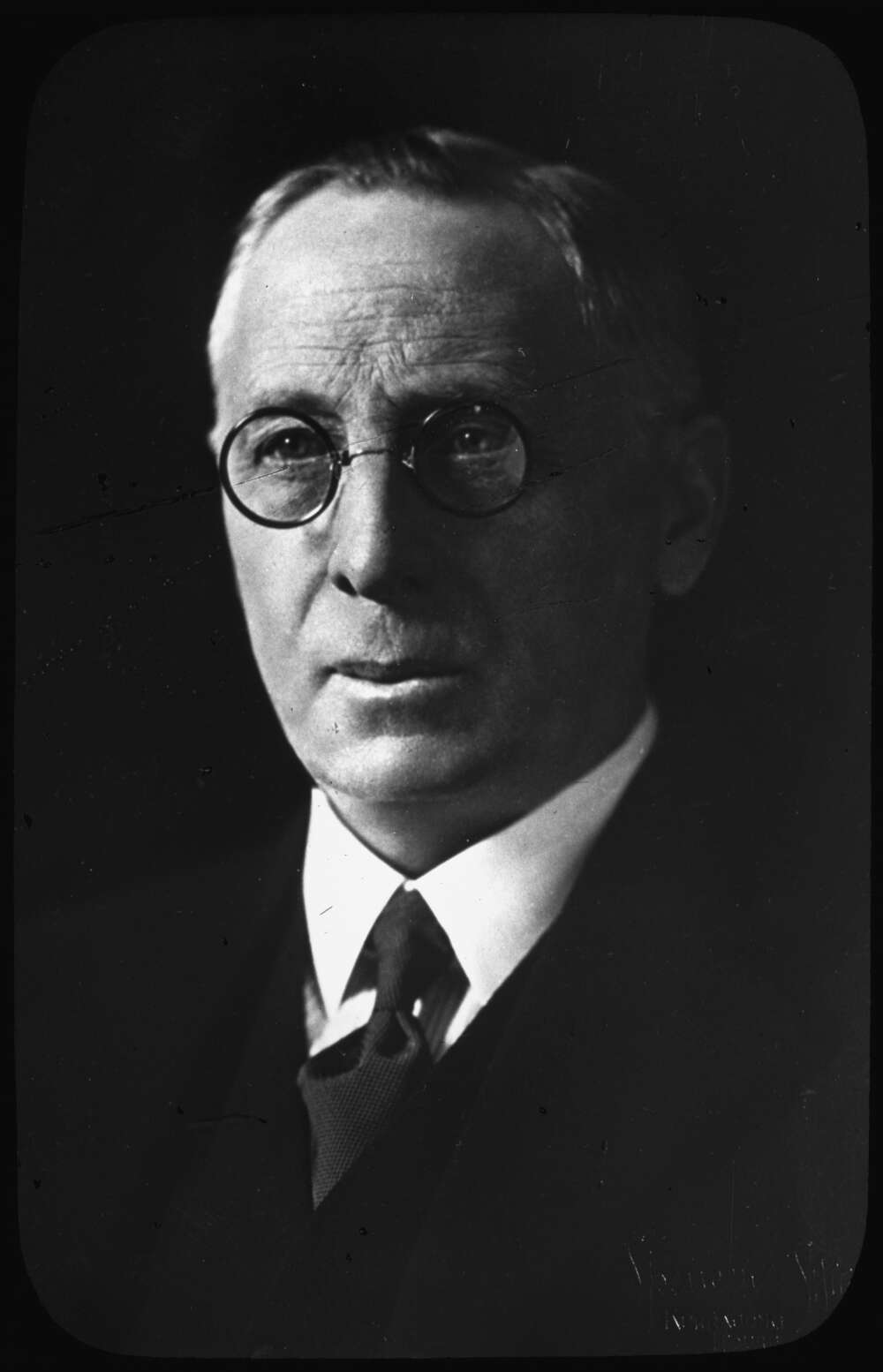
The Revd John Flynn, founder of the Royal Flying Doctor Service.

Australia embraced the new technologies of transport and communication. Coastal sailing ships were finally abandoned in favour of steam, and improvements in rail and motor transport heralded dramatic changes in work and leisure. In 1918 there were 50,000 cars and lorries in the whole of Australia. By 1929 there were 500,000.

In 1920, the Queensland and Northern Territory Aerial Service (to become the Australian airline Qantas) was established. The Reverend John Flynn, founded the Royal Flying Doctor Service, the world's first air ambulance in 1928. Dare devil pilot, Sir Charles Kingsford Smith pushed the new flying machines to the limit, completing a round Australia circuit in 1927 and in 1928 traversed the Pacific Ocean, via Hawaii and Fiji from the US to Australia in the aircraft Southern Cross. He went on to global fame and a series of aviation records before vanishing on a night flight to Singapore in 1935.

The stage coach company Cobb and Co, established in 1853, finally closed in 1924.

==== Labour issues ====
Other significant after-effects of the war included ongoing industrial unrest, which included the 1923 Victorian Police strike. Industrial disputes characterised the 1920s in Australia. Other major strikes occurred on the waterfront, in the coalmining and timber industries in the late 1920s. The union movement had established the Australian Council of Trade Unions (ACTU) in 1927 in response to the Nationalist government's efforts to change working conditions and reduce the power of the unions.

Following the success of the Bolshevik Revolution in Russia the Communist Party of Australia was formed in 1920 and, though remaining electorally insignificant, it obtained some influence in the Trade Union movement and was banned during World War II for its support for the Hitler-Stalin Pact and the Menzies Government unsuccessfully tried to ban it again during the Korean War. Despite splits, the party remained active until its dissolution at the end of the Cold War.

==== Popular culture in 1920s ====
Jazz music, entertainment culture, new technology and consumerism that characterised the 1920s in the USA was, to some extent, also found in Australia. Prohibition was not implemented in Australia, though anti-alcohol forces were successful in having hotels closed after 6 pm, and closed altogether in a few city suburbs.

The fledgling film industry declined through the decade, over 2 million Australians attending cinemas weekly at 1250 venues. A Royal Commission in 1927 failed to assist and the industry that had begun so brightly with the release of the world's first feature film, The Story of the Kelly Gang (1906), atrophied until its revival in the 1970s.

=== Great Depression: the 1930s ===
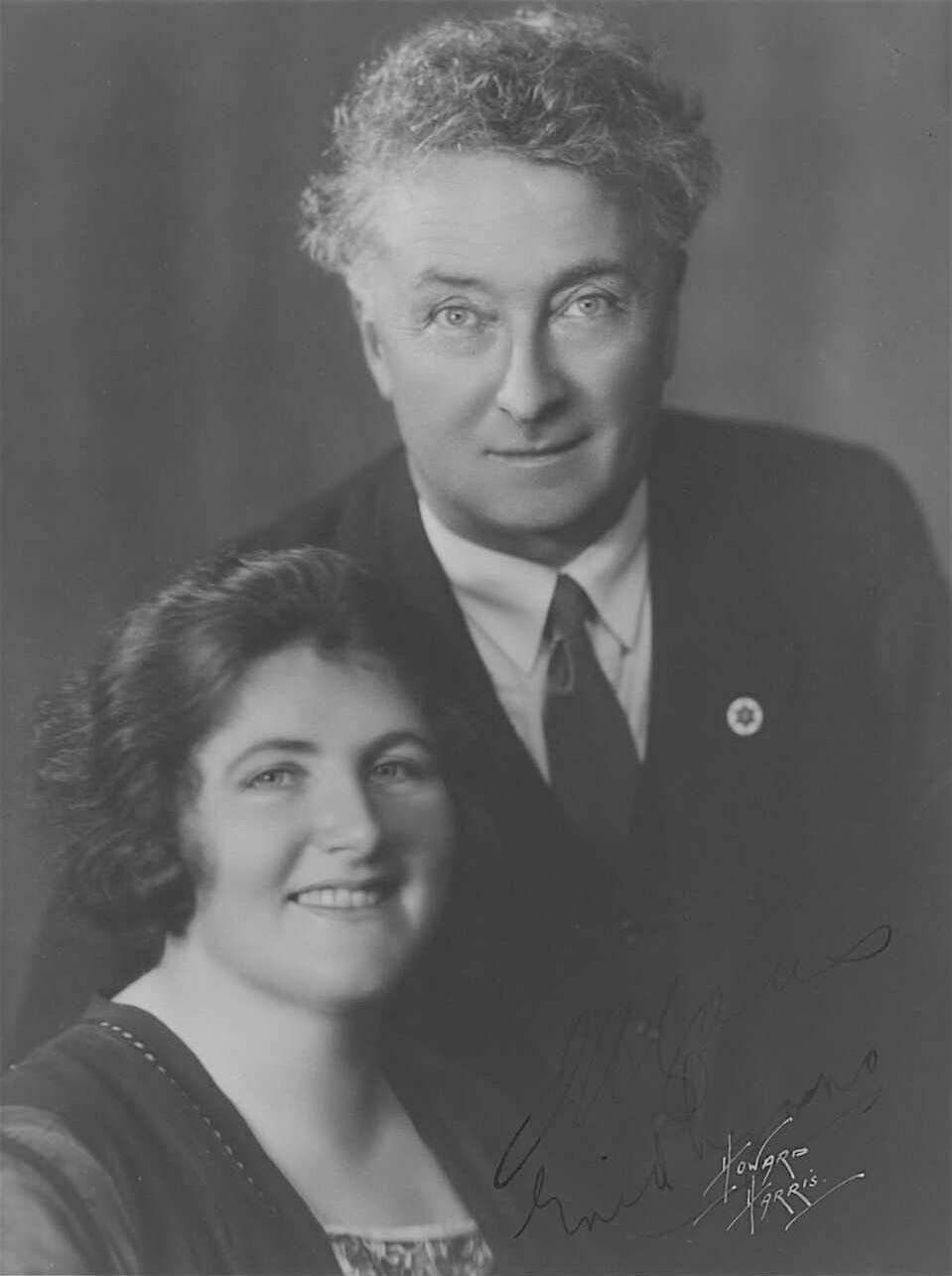
Prime Minister Joseph Lyons (1931–1939), pictured with his politically active wife Enid Lyons. The Lyons United Australia Party Government stewarded Australia through its recovery from the Great Depression.

Australia's dependence on primary exports such as wheat and wool was cruelly exposed by the Great Depression of the 1930s, which produced unemployment and destitution even greater than those seen during the 1890s. The Labor Party under James Scullin won the 1929 election in a landslide but was quite unable to cope with the Depression. Labor split into three factions and then lost power in 1932 to a new conservative party, the United Australia Party (UAP) led by Joseph Lyons, and did not return to office until 1941. Australia made a very slow recovery from the Depression during the late 1930s. Lyons died in 1939 and was succeeded by Robert Menzies.

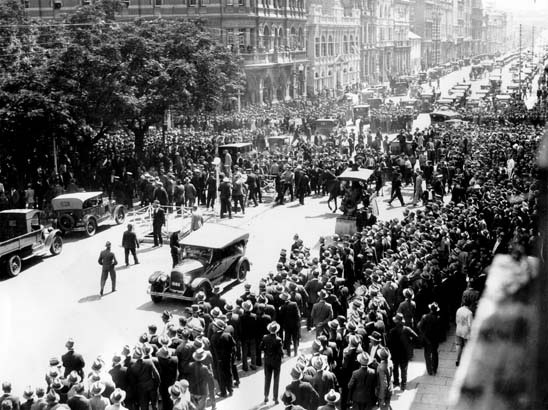
In 1931, over 1000 unemployed men marched from the Esplanade to the Treasury Building in Perth, Western Australia to see Premier Sir James Mitchell.

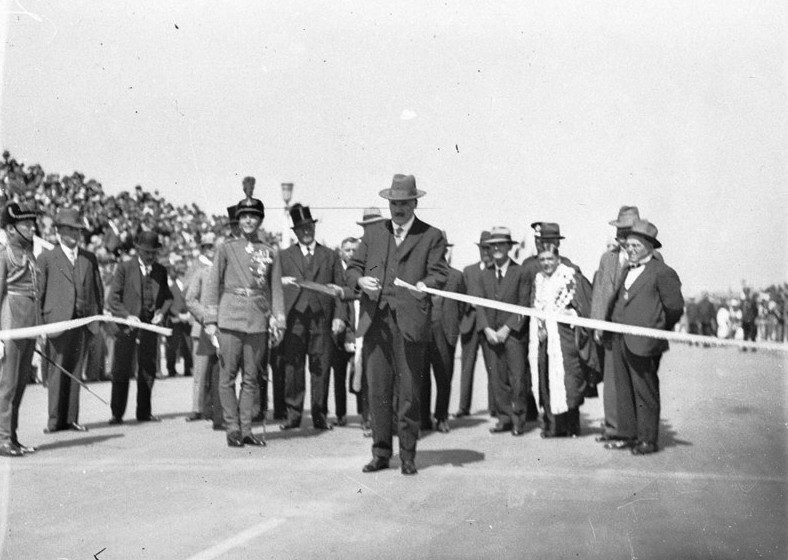
Ribbon ceremony to open the Sydney Harbour Bridge on 20 March 1932. Breaking protocol, the soon to be dismissed Premier Jack Lang cuts the ribbon while Governor Philip Game looks on.

Exposed by continuous borrowing to fund capital works in the 1920s, the Australian and state governments were "already far from secure in 1927, when most economic indicators took a turn for the worse. Australia's dependence of exports left her extraordinarily vulnerable to world market fluctuations," according to economic historian Geoff Spenceley. Debt by the state of New South Wales accounted for almost half Australia's accumulated debt by December 1927. The situation caused alarm amongst a few politicians and economists, notably Edward Shann of the University of Western Australia, but most political, union and business leaders were reluctant to admit to serious problems. In 1926, Australian Finance magazine described loans as occurring with a "disconcerting frequency" unrivalled in the British Empire: "It may be a loan to pay off maturing loans or a loan to pay the interest on existing loans, or a loan to repay temporary loans from the bankers.... Thus, well before the Wall Street crash of 1929, the Australian economy was already facing significant difficulties. As the economy slowed in 1927, so did manufacturing and the country slipped into recession as profits slumped and unemployment rose.

At elections held in October 1929 the Labor Party was swept to power in a landslide, the former Prime Minister Stanley Bruce losing his own seat. The new Prime Minister James Scullin and his largely inexperienced Government were almost immediately faced with a series of crises. Hamstrung by their lack of control of the Senate, a lack of control over the Banking system and divisions within their Party over how best to deal with the situation, the government was forced to accept solutions that eventually split the party, as it had in 1917. Some gravitated to New South Wales Premier Lang, other to Prime Minister Scullin.

Various "plans" to resolve the crisis were suggested; Sir Otto Niemeyer, a representative of the English banks who visited in mid 1930, proposed a deflationary plan, involving cuts to government spending and wages. Treasurer Ted Theodore proposed a mildly inflationary plan, while the Labor Premier of New South Wales, Jack Lang, proposed a radical plan which repudiated overseas debt. The "Premier's Plan" finally accepted by federal and state governments in June 1931, followed the deflationary model advocated by Niemeyer and included a reduction of 20% in government spending, a reduction in bank interest rates and an increase in taxation. In March 1931, Lang announced that interest due in London would not be paid and the Federal government stepped in to meet the debt. In May, the Government Savings Bank of New South Wales was forced to close. The Melbourne Premiers' Conference agreed to cut wages and pensions as part of a severe deflationary policy but Lang, renounced the plan. The grand opening of the Sydney Harbour Bridge in 1932 provided little respite to the growing crisis straining the young federation. With multimillion-pound debts mounting, public demonstrations and move and counter-move by Lang and the Scullin, then Lyons federal governments, the Governor of New South Wales, Philip Game, had been examining Lang's instruction not to pay money into the Federal Treasury. Game judged it was illegal. Lang refused to withdraw his order and, on 13 May, he was dismissed by Governor Game. At June elections, Lang Labor's seats collapsed.

May 1931 had seen the creation of a new conservative political force, the United Australia Party formed by breakaway members of the Labor Party combining with the Nationalist Party. At Federal elections in December 1931, the United Australia Party, led by former Labor member Joseph Lyons, easily won office. They remained in power under Lyons through Australia's recovery from the Great Depression and into the early stages of the World War II under Robert Menzies.

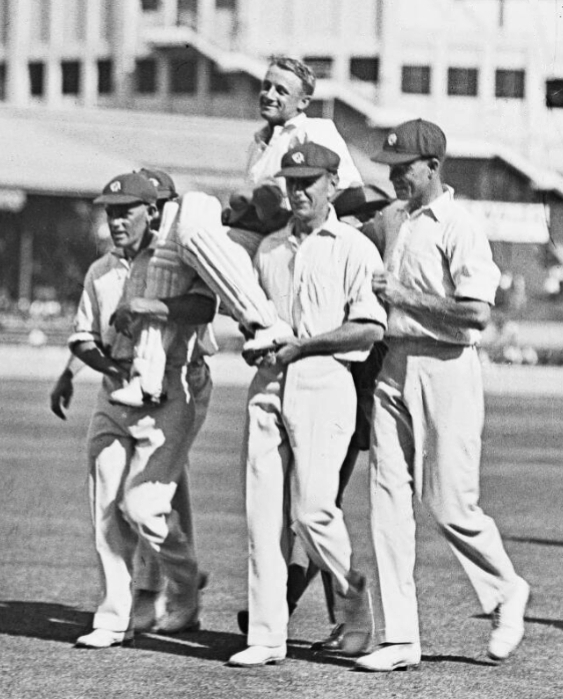
21-year-old Don Bradman is chaired off the cricket pitch after scoring a world record 452 runs not out in 1930. Sporting success lifted Australian spirits through the Depression years.

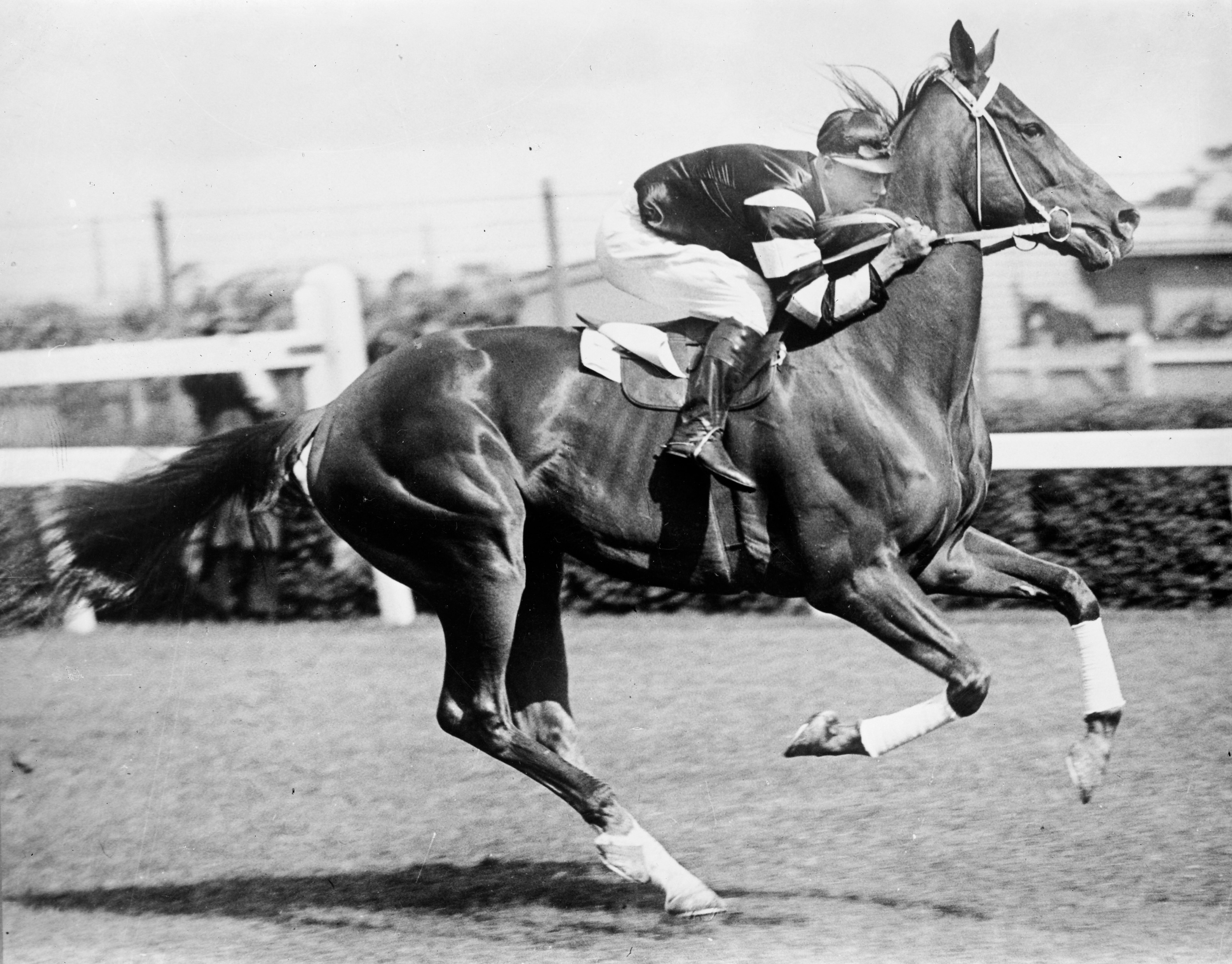
Phar Lap, c. 1930.

Lyons favoured the tough economic measures of the "Premiers' Plan", pursued an orthodox fiscal policy and refused to accept NSW Premier Jack Lang's proposals to default on overseas debt repayments. According to author Anne Henderson of the Sydney Institute, Lyons held a steadfast belief in the need to balance budgets, lower costs to business and restore confidence and the Lyons period gave Australia stability and eventual growth between the drama of the Depression and the outbreak of the Second World War. A lowering of wages was enforced and industry tariff protections maintained, which together with cheaper raw materials during the 1930s saw a shift from agriculture to manufacturing as the chief employer of the Australian economy – a shift which was consolidated by increased investment by the commonwealth government into defence and armaments manufacture. Lyons saw restoration of Australia's exports as the key to economic recovery. The Lyons government has often been credited with steering recovery from the depression, although just how much of this was owed to their policies remains contentious. Stuart Macintyre also points out that although Australian GDP grew from £386.9 million to £485.9 million between 1931–1932 and 1938–1939, real domestic product per head of population was still "but a few shillings greater in 1938–1939 (£70.12), than it had been in 1920–1921 (£70.04).

There is debate over the extent reached by unemployment in Australia, often cited as peaking at 29% in 1932. "Trade Union figures are the most often quoted, but the people who were there…regard the figures as wildly understating the extent of unemployment" wrote historian Wendy Lowenstein in her collection of oral histories of the Depression. However, David Potts argues that "over the last thirty years …historians of the period have either uncritically accepted that figure (29% in the peak year 1932) including rounding it up to 'a third,' or they have passionately argued that a third is far too low." Potts suggests a peak national figure of 25% unemployed.

Extraordinary sporting successes did something to alleviate the spirits of Australians during the economic downturn. In a Sheffield Shield cricket match at the Sydney Cricket Ground in 1930, Don Bradman, a young New South Welshman of just 21 years of age wrote his name into the record books by smashing the previous highest batting score in first-class cricket with 452 runs not out in just 415 minutes. The rising star's world beating cricketing exploits were to provide much needed joy to Australians through the emerging Great Depression in Australia and post-World War II recovery. Between 1929 and 1931 the racehorse Phar Lap dominated Australia's racing industry, at one stage winning fourteen races in a row. Famous victories included the 1930 Melbourne Cup, following an assassination attempt and carrying 9 stone 12 pounds weight. Phar Lap sailed for the United States in 1931, going on to win North America's richest race, the Agua Caliente Handicap in 1932. Soon after, on the cusp of US success, Phar Lap developed suspicious symptoms and died. Theories swirled that the champion race horse had been poisoned and a devoted Australian public went into shock. The 1938 British Empire Games were held in Sydney from 5–12 February, timed to coincide with Sydney's sesqui-centenary (150 years since the foundation of British settlement in Australia).

== Second World War ==
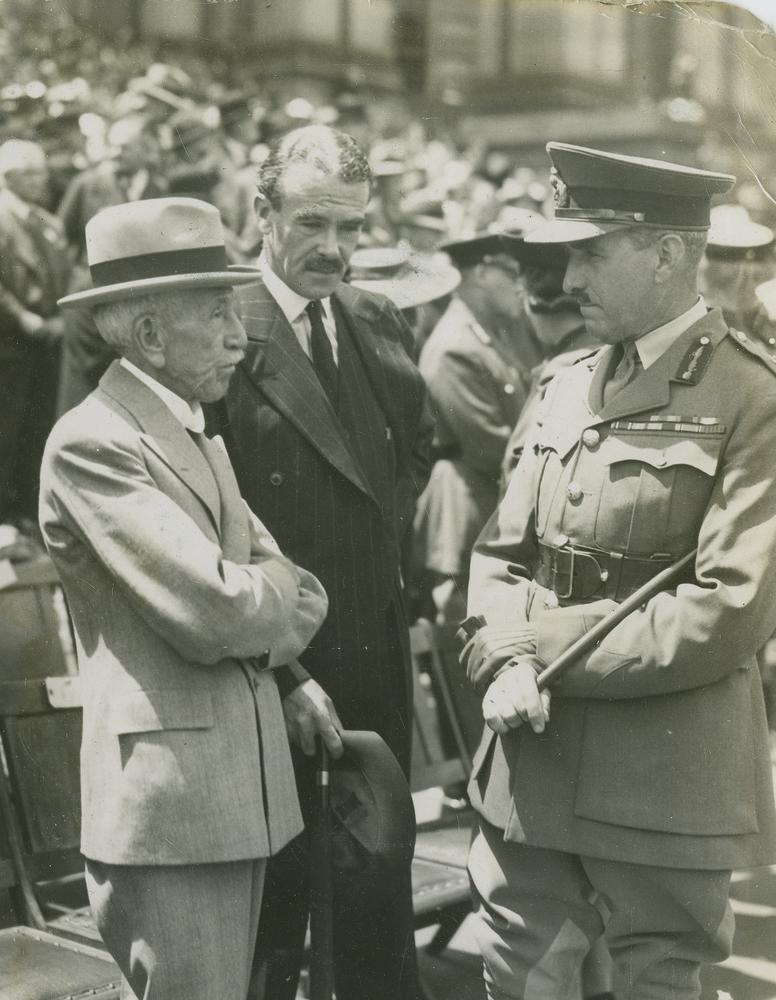
UAP Minister and veteran World War I Prime Minister Billy Hughes (left) with Richard Casey and John Lavarack c. 1933. Hughes opposed the policy of "appeasement" favoured by the Western powers and warned of an Australia ill-prepared for the coming war.

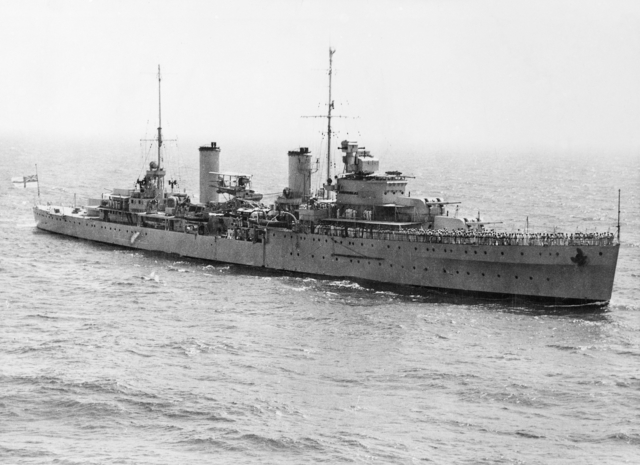
The light cruiser HMAS Sydney, lost in a battle in the Indian Ocean, November 1941.

=== Defence policy in the 1930s ===
Defence issues became increasingly prominent in public affairs with the rise of fascism in Europe and militant Japan in Asia. Prime Minister Lyons sent veteran World War I Prime Minister Billy Hughes to represent Australia at the 1932 League of Nations Assembly in Geneva and in 1934 Hughes became Minister for Health and Repatriation. Later Lyons appointed him Minister for External Affairs, however Hughes was forced to resign in 1935 after his book Australia and the War Today exposed a lack of preparation in Australia for what Hughes correctly supposed to be a coming war. Soon after, the Lyons government tripled the defence budget. With Western Powers developing a policy of appeasement to try to satisfy the demands of Europe's new dictators without war, Prime Minister Lyons sailed for Britain in 1937 for the coronation of King George VI and Queen Elizabeth, en route conducting a diplomatic mission to Italy on behalf of the British Government, visiting Benito Mussolini with assurances of British friendship.

Until the late 1930s defence was not a significant issue for Australians. At the 1937 elections, both political parties advocated increased defence spending, in the context of increased Japanese aggression in China and Germany's aggression in Europe. There was a difference in opinion over how the defence spending should be allocated however. The UAP government emphasised co-operation with Britain in "a policy of imperial defence." The lynchpin of this was the British naval base at Singapore and the Royal Navy battle fleet "which, it was hoped, would use it in time of need." Defence spending in the inter-war years reflected this priority. In the period 1921–1936 totalled £40 million on the Royal Australian Navy (RAN), £20 million on the Australian Army and £6 million on the Royal Australian Air Force (RAAF) (established in 1921, the "youngest" of the three services). In 1939, the Navy, which included two heavy cruisers and four light cruisers, was the service best equipped for war.

Scarred by the experiences of World War I, Australia reluctantly prepared for a new war, in which the primacy of the British Royal Navy would indeed prove insufficient to defend Australia from attack from the north. Billy Hughes was brought back into cabinet by Lyons as Minister for External Affairs in 1937. From 1938, Lyons used Hughes to head a recruitment drive for the Australian Defence Force. Prime Minister Lyons died in office in April 1939, with Australia just months from war, and the United Australia Party selected Robert Menzies as its new leader. Fearing Japanese intentions in the Pacific, Menzies established independent embassies in Tokyo and Washington to receive independent advice about developments.

Gavin Long argues that the Labor opposition urged greater national self-reliance through a buildup of manufacturing and more emphasis on the Army and RAAF, as Chief of the General Staff, John Lavarack also advocated. In November 1936, Labor leader John Curtin said "The dependence of Australia upon the competence, let alone the readiness, of British statesmen to send forces to our aid is too dangerous a hazard upon which to found Australia's defence policy.". According to John Robertson, "some British leaders had also realised that their country could not fight Japan and Germany at the same time." But "this was never discussed candidly at…meeting(s) of Australian and British defence planners", such as the 1937 Imperial Conference.

By September 1939 the Australian Army numbered 3,000 regulars. A recruiting campaign in late 1938, led by Major-General Thomas Blamey increased the reserve militia to almost 80,000. The first division raised for war was designated the 6th Division, of the 2nd AIF, there being five Militia Divisions on paper and a 1st AIF in the First World War.

=== War ===
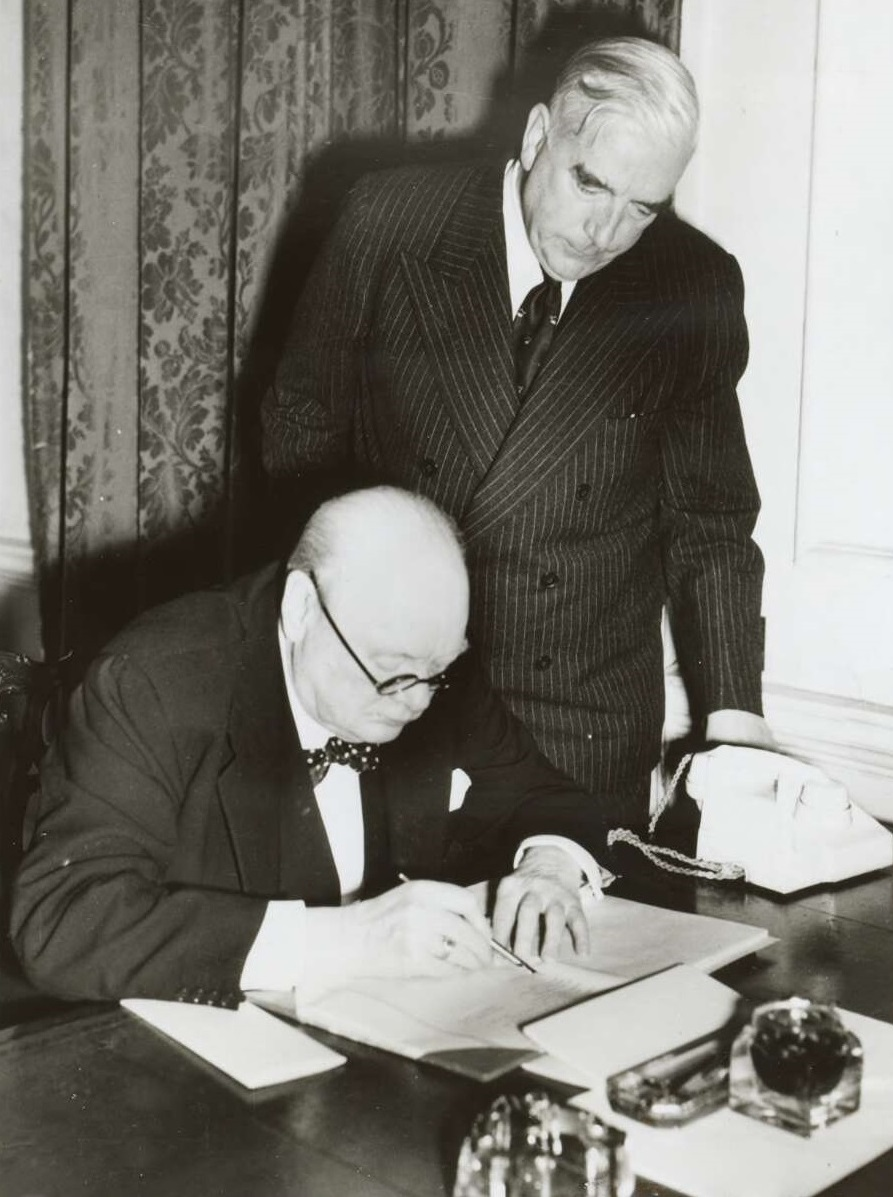
Prime Minister Robert Menzies (standing) and British Prime Minister Winston Churchill in 1941.

On 3 September 1939, the prime minister, Robert Menzies, made a national radio broadcast:

My fellow Australians. It is my melancholy duty to inform you, officially, that, in consequence of the persistence by Germany in her invasion of Poland, Great Britain has declared war upon her, and that, as a result, Australia is also at war.

Thus began Australia's involvement in the six-year global conflict. Australians fought in a variety of locations, from withstanding the advance of Hitler's Panzers in the Siege of Tobruk; to turning back the advance of the Imperial Japanese Army in the New Guinea Campaign. From bomber missions over Europe and Mediterranean naval engagements, to facing Japanese mini-sub raids on Sydney Harbour and air raids on the city of Darwin.

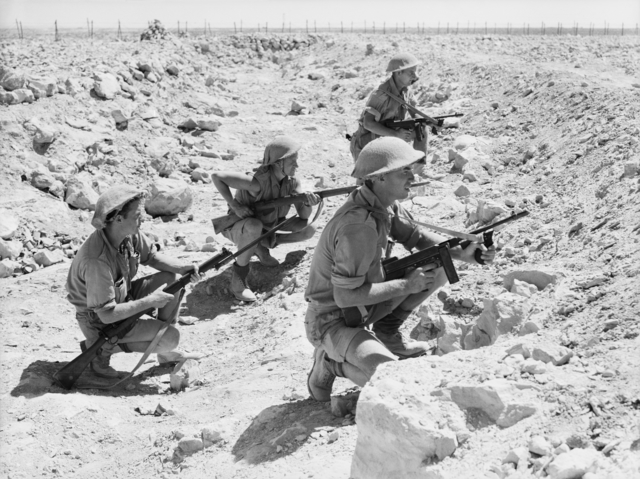
A patrol from the 2/13th Infantry Battalion at Tobruk in North Africa, (AWM 020779). The 1941 Siege of Tobruk saw an Australian garrison halt the advance of Hitler's Panzer divisions for the first time since the commencement of the war.

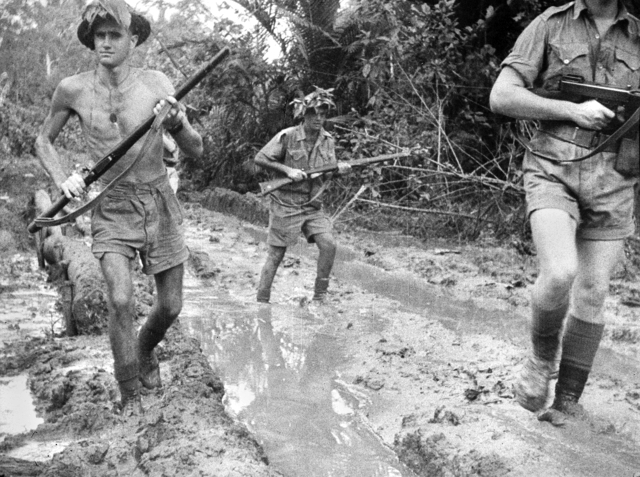
Australian troops at Milne Bay, New Guinea.The Australian army was the first to inflict defeat on the Imperial Japanese Army during World War II at the Battle of Milne Bay of August–September 1942.

The recruitment of a volunteer military force for service at home and abroad was announced, the 2nd Australian Imperial Force, and a citizen militia organised for local defence. Troubled by Britain's failure to increase defences at Singapore, Menzies was cautious in committing troops to Europe. By the end of June 1940, France, Norway and the Low Countries had fallen to Nazi Germany and Britain, stood alone with its Dominions. Menzies called for "all out war", increasing Federal powers and introducing conscription. Menzies' minority government came to rely on just two independents after the 1940 election

In January 1941 Menzies flew to Britain to discuss the weakness of Singapore's defences. Arriving in London during The Blitz, Menzies was invited into Winston Churchill's British War Cabinet for the duration of his visit. Returning to Australia, with the threat of Japan imminent and with the Australian army suffering badly in the Greek and Crete campaigns, Menzies re-approached the Labor Party to form a War Cabinet. Unable to secure their support, and with an unworkable parliamentary majority, Menzies resigned as prime minister. The Coalition held office for another month, before the independents switched allegiance and John Curtin was sworn in Prime Minister. Eight weeks later, Japan attacked Pearl Harbor.

From 1940 to 1941, Australian forces played prominent roles in the fighting in the Mediterranean theatre, including Operation Compass, the Siege of Tobruk, the Greek campaign, the Battle of Crete, the Syria-Lebanon campaign and the Second Battle of El Alamein.

A garrison of around 14,000 Australian soldiers, commanded by Lieutenant General Leslie Morshead was besieged in Tobruk, Libya by the German-Italian army of General Erwin Rommel between April and August 1941. The Nazi propagandist Lord Haw Haw derided the defenders as 'rats', a term the soldiers adopted as an ironic compliment: "The Rats of Tobruk". Vital in the defence of Egypt and the Suez Canal, the Siege saw the advance of the German army halted for the first time and provided a morale boost for the British Commonwealth, which was then standing alone against Hitler.

With most of Australia's best forces committed to fight against Hitler in the Middle East, Japan attacked Pearl Harbor, the US naval base in Hawaii, on 8 December 1941 (eastern Australia time). The British battleship HMS Prince of Wales and battlecruiser HMS Repulse sent to defend Singapore were sunk soon afterwards. Australia was ill-prepared for an attack, lacking armaments, modern fighter aircraft, heavy bombers, and aircraft carriers. While demanding reinforcements from Churchill, on 27 December 1941 Curtin published an historic announcement:

"The Australian Government... regards the Pacific struggle as primarily one in which the United States and Australia must have the fullest say in the direction of the democracies' fighting plan. Without inhibitions of any kind, I make it clear that Australia looks to America, free of any pangs as to our traditional links or kinship with the United Kingdom."

British Malaya quickly collapsed, shocking the Australian nation. British, Indian and Australian troops made a disorganised last stand at Singapore, before surrendering on 15 February 1942. 15,000 Australian soldiers became prisoners of war. Curtin predicted that the 'battle for Australia' would now follow. On 19 February, Darwin suffered a devastating air raid, the first time the Australian mainland had ever been attacked by enemy forces. Over the following 19 months, Australia was attacked from the air almost 100 times.

Three reinforced infantry battalions awaited the advancing Japanese in an arc across Australia's north: Sparrow Force on Timor, Gull Force on Ambon and Lark Force on New Britain. These "bird forces" were overwhelmed: in early 1942, Lark Force was defeated in the Battle of Rabaul (1942) and Gull Force surrendered in the Battle of Ambon and through 1942–3, Sparrow Force engaged in a prolonged guerilla campaign in Battle of Timor. Captured Australian Prisoners of War suffered severe ill-treatment in the Pacific Theatre. Around 160 men of Lark Force were bayonetted after capture at Toll Plantation, while 300 of the surrendering Gull Force were summarily executed in the Laha Massacre and 75% of their comrades perished due to ill-treatment and the conditions of their incarceration. In 1943, 2,815 Australian POWs died constructing Japan's Burma-Thailand Railway In 1944, the Japanese inflicted the Sandakan Death March on 2,000 Australian and British prisoners of war – only six survived. This was the single worst war crime perpetrated against Australians in war.

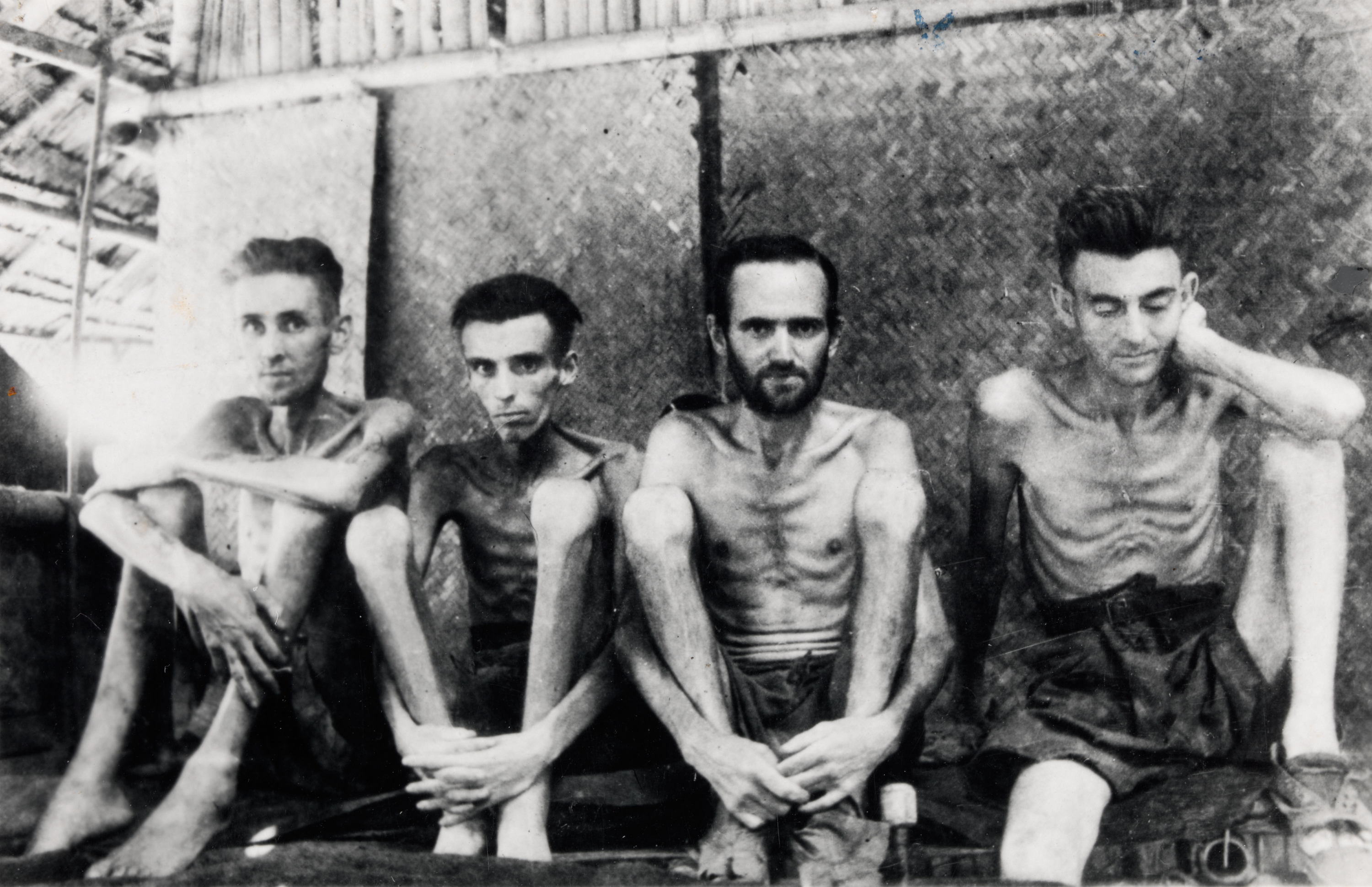
Netherlands and Australian PoWs at Tarsau, in Thailand in 1943. 22,000 Australians were captured by the Japanese, of whom around 8000 subsequently died.

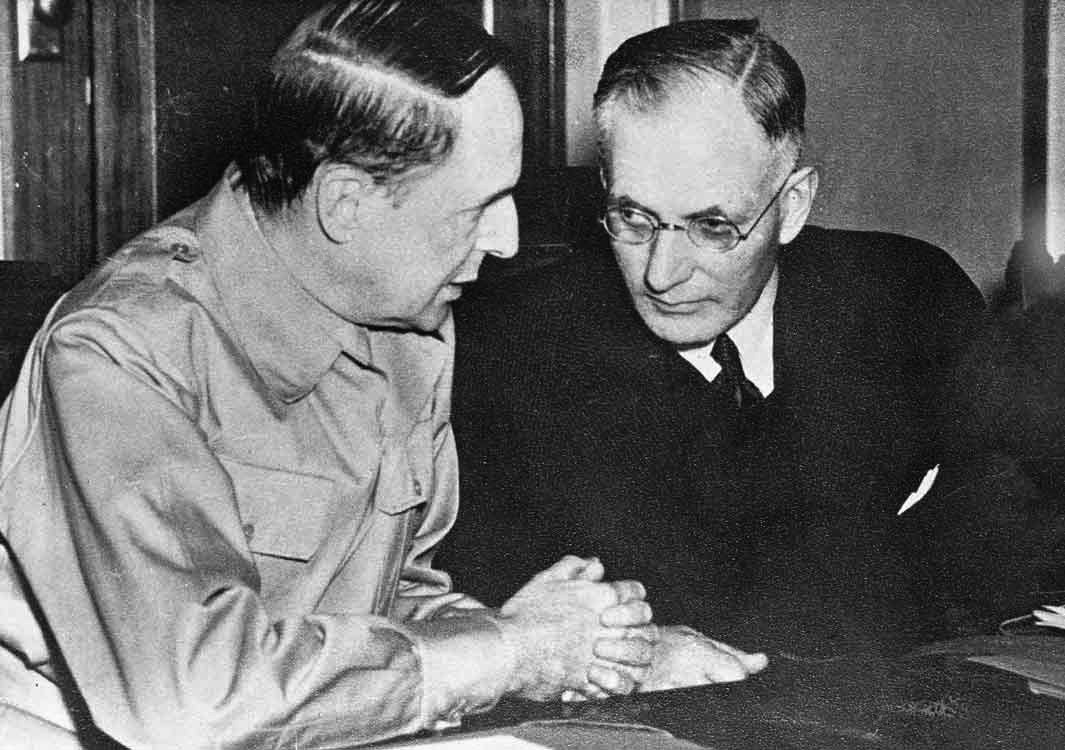
US General Douglas MacArthur (left), Commander of Allied forces in the Pacific, with Prime Minister John Curtin.

Two battle-hardened Australian divisions were already steaming from the Mid-East for Singapore. Churchill wanted them diverted to Burma, but Curtin refused, and anxiously awaited their return to Australia. US president Franklin D. Roosevelt ordered his commander in the Philippines, General Douglas MacArthur, to formulate a Pacific defence plan with Australia in March 1942. Curtin agreed to place Australian forces under the command of General MacArthur, who became "Supreme Commander of the South West Pacific". Curtin had thus presided over a fundamental shift in Australia's foreign policy. MacArthur moved his headquarters to Melbourne in March 1942 and American troops began massing in Australia. In late May 1942, Japanese midget submarines sank an accommodation vessel in a daring raid on Sydney Harbour. On 8 June 1942, two Japanese submarines briefly shelled Sydney's eastern suburbs and the city of Newcastle.

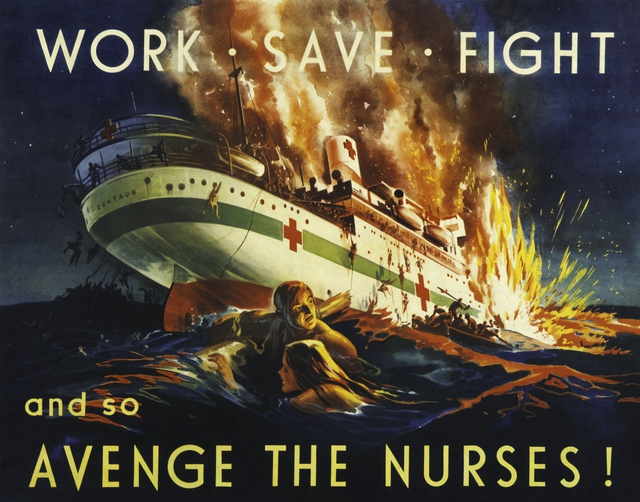
A propaganda poster calling for Australians to avenge the 1943 sinking of Australian Hospital Ship Centaur off the Queensland coast.

In an effort to isolate Australia, the Japanese planned a seaborne invasion of Port Moresby, in the Australian Territory of New Guinea. In May 1942, the US Navy engaged the Japanese in the Battle of the Coral Sea and halted the attack. The Battle of Midway in June effectively defeated the Japanese navy but the Japanese army launched a land assault on Moresby from the north. Between July and November 1942, Australian forces repulsed Japanese attempts on the city by way of the Kokoda Track, in the highlands of New Guinea. The Battle of Milne Bay in August 1942 was the first Allied defeat of Japanese land forces.

Meanwhile, in North Africa, Germany drove the Allies back into Egypt. A turning point came between July and November 1942, when Australia's 9th Division played a crucial role in some of the heaviest fighting of the First and Second Battle of El Alamein, which turned the North Africa Campaign in favour of the Allies.

Concerned to maintain British commitment to the defence of Australia, Prime Minister Curtin announced in November 1943 that Prince Henry, Duke of Gloucester was to be appointed Governor General of Australia. He was the brother of King George VI and he arrived in Australia in January 1945. Curtin hoped this might influence the British to despatch men and equipment to the Pacific, and the appointment reaffirmed the important role of the Crown to the Australian nation.

On 14 May 1943, the Australian Hospital Ship Centaur, though clearly marked as a medical vessel, was sunk by a Japanese submarine off the Queensland coast. Of the 332 persons on board including doctors and nurses, just 64 survived and only one of the ship's nursing staff, Ellen Savage. The war crime further enraged popular opinion against Japan.

The Battle of Buna-Gona between November 1942 and January 1943, saw Australian and United States forces attack the main Japanese beachheads in New Guinea, at Buna, Sanananda and Gona. Facing tropical disease, difficult terrain and well constructed Japanese defences, the allies only secured victory with heavy casualties. The battle set the tone for the remainder of the New Guinea Campaign. The offensives in Papua and New Guinea of 1943–44 were the single largest series of connected operations ever mounted by the Australian armed forces. The Supreme Commander of operations was the United States General Douglas Macarthur, with Australian General Thomas Blamey taking a direct role in planning and operations being essentially directed by staff at New Guinea Force headquarters in Port Moresby. Bitter fighting continued in New Guinea between the largely Australian force and the Japanese 18th Army based in New Guinea until the Japanese surrender in 1945.

MacCarthur excluded Australian forces from the main push north into the Philippines and Japan. It was left to Australia to lead amphibious assaults against Japanese bases in Borneo. Curtin suffered from ill health from the strains of office and died weeks before the war ended, replaced by Ben Chifley.

Of Australia's wartime population of 7 million, almost 1 million men and women served in a branch of the services during the six years of warfare. By war's end, gross enlistments totalled 727,200 men and women in the Australian Army (of whom 557,800 served overseas), 216,900 in the RAAF and 48,900 in the RAN. Over 39,700 were killed or died as prisoners of war, about 8,000 of whom died as prisoners of the Japanese.

=== The Homefront ===
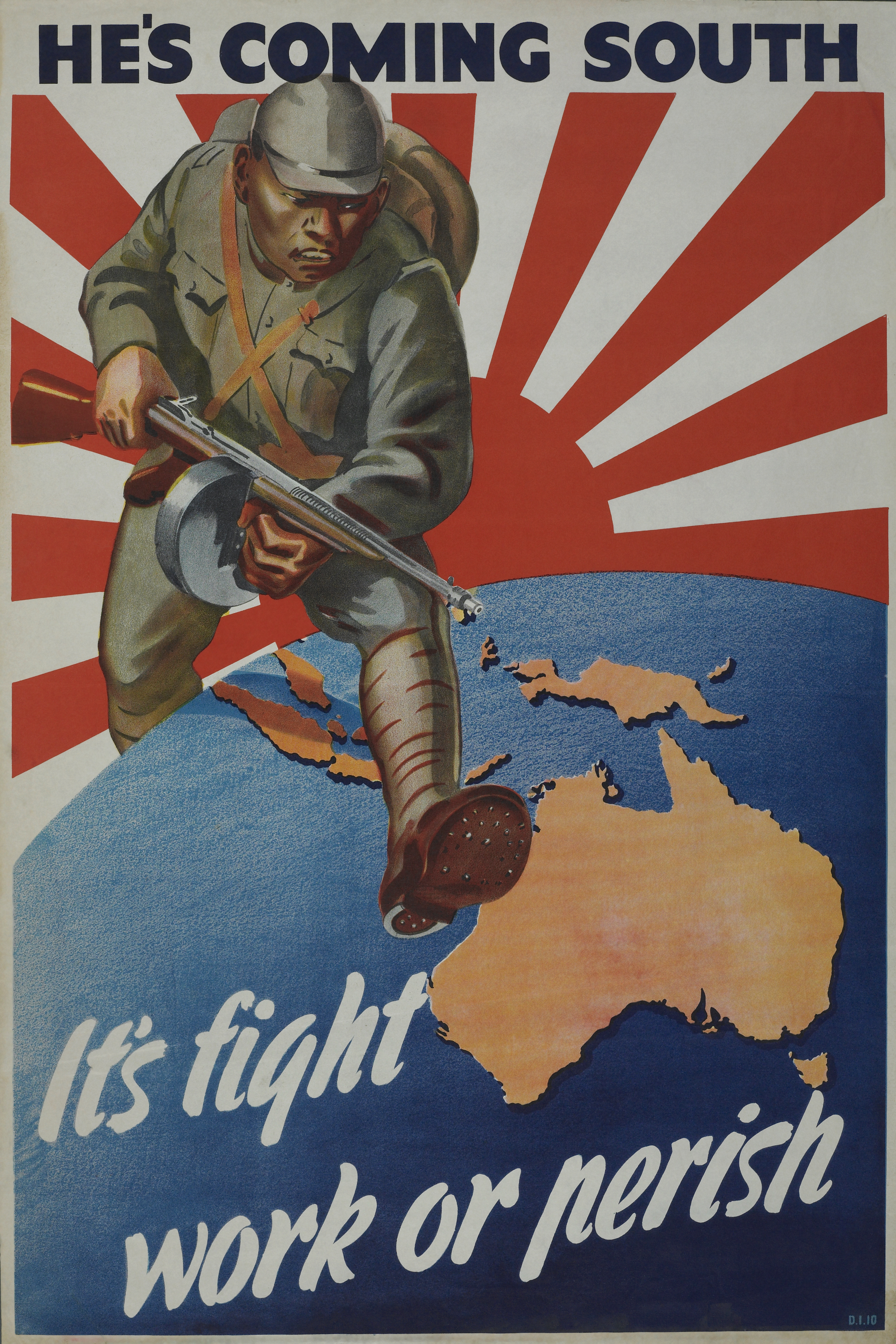
1942 Australian propaganda poster used on the homefront. Australia feared invasion by Imperial Japan following the Fall of Singapore.

The Australian economy was markedly affected by World War II. Expenditure on war reached 37% of GDP by 1943–4, compared to 4% expenditure in 1939–1940. Total war expenditure was £2,949 million between 1939 and 1945.

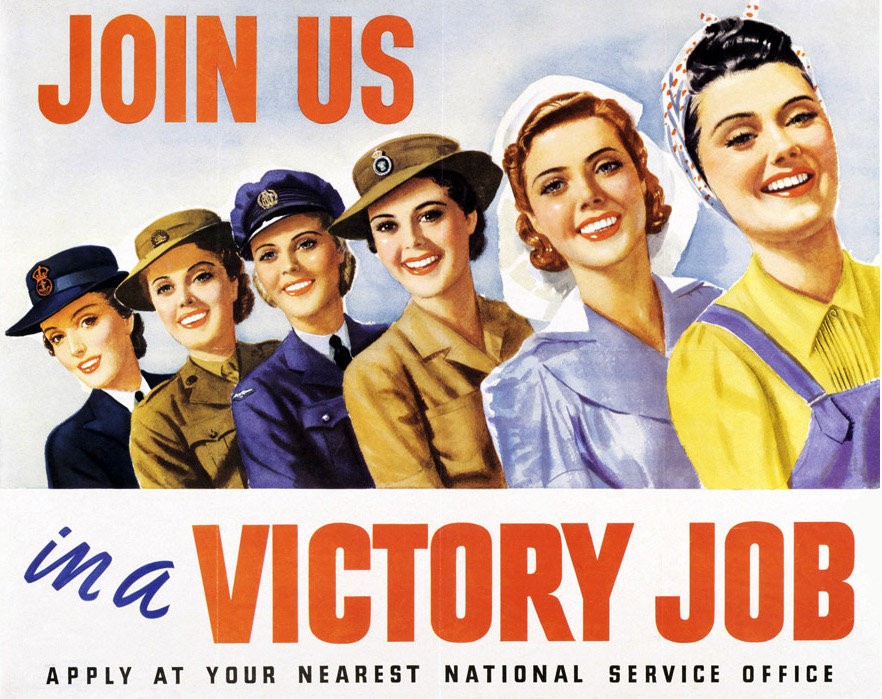
Australian women were encouraged to contribute to the war effort by joining one of the female branches of the armed forces or participating in the labour force.

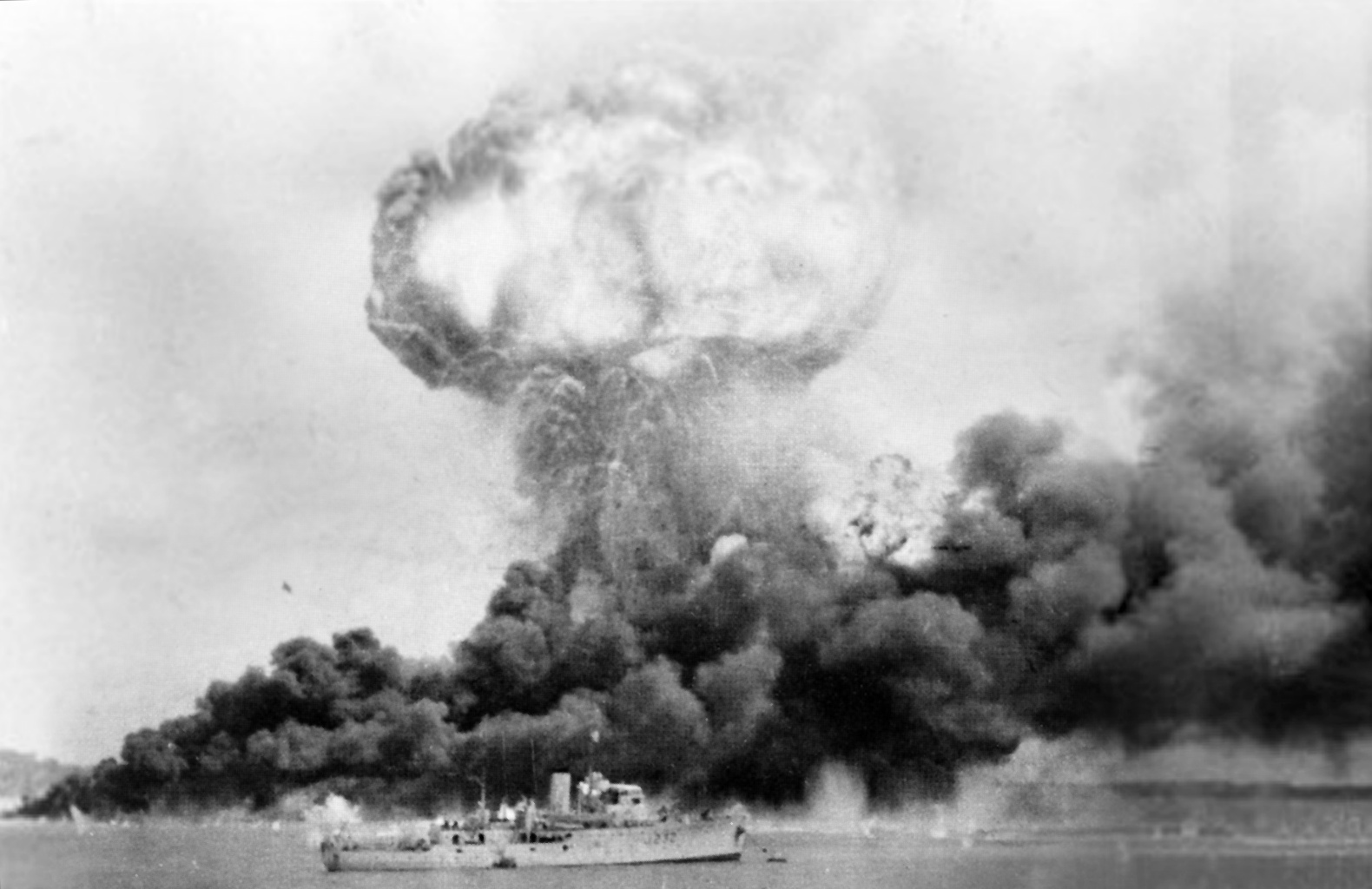
The Bombing of Darwin, 19 February 1942.

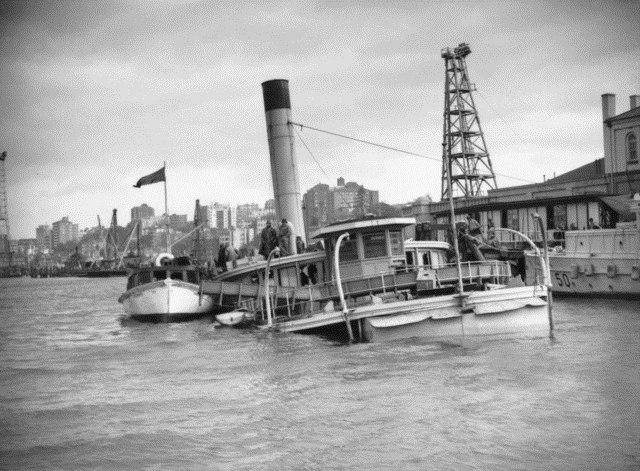
The Kuttabul, sunk by a Japanese midget submarine attack on Sydney Harbour, 1942.

Although the peak of Army enlistments occurred in June–July 1940, when over 70,000 enlisted, it was the Curtin Labor government, formed in October 1941, that was largely responsible for "a complete revision of the whole Australian economic, domestic and industrial life." Rationing of fuel, clothing and some food was introduced, (although less severely than in Britain) Christmas holidays curtailed, "brown outs" introduced and some public transport reduced. From December 1941, the Government evacuated all women and children from Darwin and northern Australia, and over 10,000 refugees arrived from South East Asia as Japan advanced. In January 1942, the Manpower Directorate was set up "to ensure the organisation of Australians in the best possible way to meet all defence requirements." Minister for War Organisation of Industry, John Dedman introduced a degree of austerity and government control previously unknown, to such an extent that he was nicknamed "the man who killed Father Christmas."

In May 1942 uniform tax laws were introduced in Australia, as state governments relinquished their control over income taxation, "The significance of this decision was greater than any other… made throughout the war, as it added extensive powers to the Federal Government and greatly reduced the financial autonomy of the states."

Manufacturing grew significantly because of the war. "In 1939 there were only three Australian firms producing machine tools, but by 1943 there were more than one hundred doing so." From having few front line aircraft in 1939, the RAAF had become the fourth largest allied Air Force by 1945. A number of aircraft were built under licence in Australia before the war's end, notably the Beaufort and Beaufighter, although the majority of aircraft were from Britain and later, the USA. The Boomerang fighter, designed and built in four months of 1942, emphasised the desperate state Australia found itself in as the Japanese advanced.

Between 1939 and 1944 the number of women working in factories rose from 171,000 to 286,000. Dame Enid Lyons, widow of former prime minister Joseph Lyons, became the first woman elected to the House of Representatives in 1943, joining the Robert Menzies' new centre-right Liberal Party of Australia, formed in 1945. At the same election, Dorothy Tangney became the first woman elected to the Senate.

Australian trade unions supported the war after Germany attacked the Soviet Union in June 1941. However, in spring 1940, the coal miners struck for higher wages for 67 days under communist leadership.

== The steps to full sovereignty ==
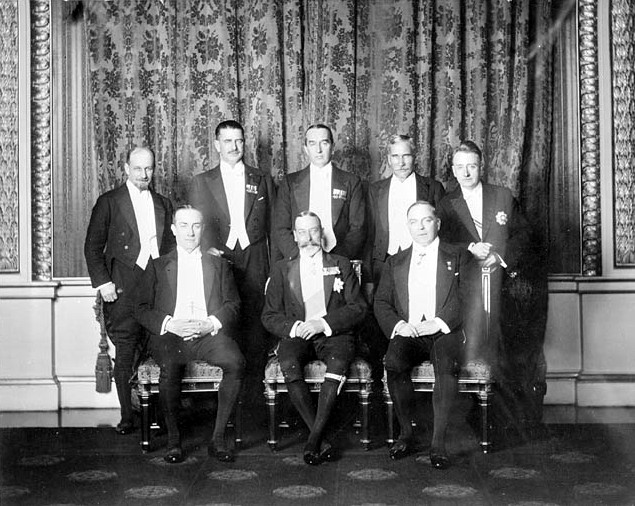
King George V (front, centre) with his prime ministers. Standing (left to right): Monroe (Newfoundland), Coates (New Zealand), Bruce (Australia), Hertzog (Union of South Africa), Cosgrave (Irish Free State). Seated: Baldwin (United Kingdom), King George V, King (Canada).

Australia achieved full sovereignty from the UK on a progressive basis. On 1 January 1901, the British Parliament passed legislation allowing the six Australian colonies to govern in their own right as part of the Commonwealth of Australia. This achieved federation of the colonies after a decade of planning, consultation and voting. The Commonwealth of Australia was now a dominion of the British Empire.

The Federal Capital Territory (later renamed the Australian Capital Territory) was formed in 1911 as the location for the future federal capital of Canberra. Melbourne was the temporary seat of government from 1901 to 1927 while Canberra was being constructed. The Northern Territory was transferred from the control of the South Australian government to the federal parliament in 1911.

In 1931, the Parliament of Britain passed the Statute of Westminster which prevented Britain from making laws for its dominions. After it was ratified by the Parliament of Australia, this formally ended most of the constitutional links between Australia and the UK, although Australia's States remained "self-governing colonial dependencies of the British Crown".

The statute formalised the Balfour Declaration of 1926, a report resulting from the 1926 Imperial Conference of British Empire leaders in London, which had defined Dominions of the British empire in the following way:

They are autonomous Communities within the British Empire, equal in status, in no way subordinate one to another in any aspect of their domestic or external affairs, though united by a common allegiance to the Crown, and freely associated as members of the British Commonwealth of Nations.

Australia did not ratify the Statute of Westminster 1931 until over a decade later, with the Statute of Westminster Adoption Act 1942. However, the ratification was backdated to 1939 to confirm the validity of legislation passed by the Australian Parliament during World War II. According to historian Frank Crowley, this was because Australians had little interest in redefining their relationship with Britain until after the crisis of World War II.

The final step to full sovereignty was the passing of the Australia Act 1986 in the UK. The Act removed the right of the British Parliament to make laws for Australia and ended any British role in the government of the Australian States. It also removed the right of appeal from Australian courts to the British Privy Council in London. Most important, the Act transferred into Australian hands full control of all Australia's constitutional documents.

== Religion, science and culture ==
=== Religion ===
The Commonwealth constitution formalised the separation of church and state while guaranteeing freedom of religious worship. At federation, about 95% of the white population declared themselves Christian of which about 40% were Church of England, 20% Catholic, 14% Methodist and 10% Presbyterian. Religion had a strong ethnic element: most Australian Anglicans being of English descent, most Catholics of Irish descent and most Presbyterians of Scottish heritage. Attempts to unite the Congregationalist, Methodist, and Presbyterian churches failed in 1901–13 and again in 1917–25.

School education was divided into separate state and Catholic education systems. Private schools with strong ties to the Protestant religions also provided schooling which mainly attracted more affluent families. About 40% of adults attended church regularly, and the family and social lives of many Australians revolved around the local church. In 1908, the papal decree Ne Temere declared Protestant and civil marriage rites invalid which exacerbated divisions between Catholics, Protestants and secularists.

The First World War also sharpened the religious divide. At first, all churches supported the war, but the Catholic hierarchy became increasingly opposed to conscription which led many Protestants to question their patriotism. After the war, Catholics generally supported the Labor Party while the conservative parties had stronger support among Protestants. Freemasonry flourished in business and politics and was generally pro-British and anti-Catholic.

=== Science ===
Federation brought an increase in national scientific organisations and centralised funding for the sciences. By 1943 there were about 500 scientific, technical and medical research institutions in Australia. Federal and state organisations were heavily involved in applied research for primary industry and manufacturing. Most research and funding was devoted to the life sciences. Museums multiplied and devoted themselves to the collection, classification and display of biological specimens and human artefacts, and the promotion of evolutionary science. Universities introduced more sub-disciplines of biology and botany. Research into plant physiology led to advances in agricultural production.

Earth sciences were also favoured because of their connection with agriculture and mining. The Australian Survey Office was established in 1910. Geological and meteorological research was integral to the Antarctic expeditions led by geologist Douglas Mawson in 1911–14 and 1929–31.

The First World War stimulated the foundation of the national Advisory Council of Science and Industry in 1916 which eventually became the Council for Scientific and Industrial Research (CSIR) in 1926. The CSIR established a Radiophysics unit in 1939. Two Australian scientists, Eric Burhop and Mark Oliphant, were seconded to the allied atomic bomb project during WWII.

Medical research was boosted by federal organisations such as the Australian Institute for Tropical Medicine (1910), the Commonwealth Serum Laboratories (1916) and the National Health and Medical Research Council (1936). Macfarlane Burnett conducted important research into immunology in the 1930s and 1940s, and Norman McCallister Gregg first published his groundbreaking research into maternal rubella in 1941.

=== Arts ===
In the first decade of the century, established writers such as Henry Lawson and Banjo Paterson and new voices such as Steele Rudd Miles Franklin, Joseph Furphy and Henry Handel Richardson helped forge a distinctive national literature. The following decades saw the emergence of critically acclaimed poets such as Christopher Brennan, John Shaw Nielson and Kenneth Slessor. The Jindyworobak movement of the late 1930s sought to create a new Australian literature drawing on Aboriginal traditions.

Australian fiction in the 1930s and 1940s was dominated by popular novelists such as Ion Idriess. Eleanor Dark, Katherine Susannah Pritchard and Christina Stead attracted critical acclaim.

Painting was dominated by a conservative nationalism which prized Australian landscape painting in the Heidelberg School tradition. Albert Namatjira became famous for fusing western landscape painting with traditional Aboriginal concern for country. A modernist reaction to the Heidelberg tradition spawned the work of artists such as Margaret Preston, Sidney Nolan, Albert Tucker and photographer Max Dupain.

Local cinema flourished in the first two decades of the century, with films about bushrangers such as The Story of the Kelly Gang (1906) and rural comedies such as On Our Selection (1920) proving popular. Local film production, however, halved in the 1930s in the face of competition from Hollywood. Ken G. Hall and Charles Chauvel, nevertheless, were successful directors in this decade.

Before the First World War, Australian theatre was dominated by British drama, bushranger plays and rural comedies. Attempts to establish an Australian national theatre were short-lived, but Louis Esson's The Time Is Not Yet Ripe (1912) was a notable work. In the inter-war years, Australian drama was fostered by the overtly political New Theatre Movement and small repertory theatres. Katherine Susannah Pritchard's Brumby Innes (1927) is notable. Poet Douglas Stewart wrote successful verse dramas for radio in the 1940s.

Australian composers of the period mostly produced conservative work based on mainstream British and European models. George Marshall-Hall was a British composer who migrated to Melbourne in 1891 and whose opera Stella (1909) is set in colonial Australia. Alfred Hill also composed operas including Auster (1922) and Ship of Heaven (1923). Percy Grainger was successful internationally for his short compositions in the style of British folk tunes although he also wrote longer orchestral pieces and experimental works. Alfred Hill and Margaret Sutherland are notable for their chamber music of the 1920s and 1930s. Clive Martin Douglas attempted to incorporate Aboriginal influences in his music and is notable for his operetta Kaditcja (1938) and his symphonic poem Carwoola (1939).

Australian popular songs before the First World War mostly drew on music hall and overseas trends such as ragtime. Nellie Melba remained popular on stage and in gramophone recordings. Local commercial record production began in 1926 and May Brahe's "Bless this House" (1927) became the most recorded Australian song. Jack O'Hagan wrote several successful songs with Australian themes including "Along the Road to Gundagai" (1922). Most Australian live music and recordings were heavily derivative of popular British and American styles such as the sentimental songs of the 1930s and swing music of the 1930s and 1940s.

== See also ==
- History of Australia since 1945
- History of broadcasting in Australia

== Sources ==
- Bashford, Alison; Macintyre, Stuart, eds. (2013). The Cambridge History of Australia, Volume 2: The Commonwealth of Australia. Port Melbourne: Cambridge University Press. ISBN 9781107011540.
  - Bashford, Alison; Hobbins, Peter. "Chapter 11: Science and medicine". In Bashford & Macintyre (2013), pp. 263–283.
  - Bridge, Carl. "Chapter 22: Australia, Britain and the British Commonwealth". In Bashford & Macintyre (2013), pp. 518–536.
  - Carter, David; Griffen-Foley, Bridget. "Chapter 10: Culture and media". In Bashford & Macintyre (2013), pp. 237–262.
  - Davison, Graeme. "Chapter 9: Religion". In Bashford & Macintyre (2013), pp. 215–236.
- Bassett, Jan, ed. (1986). The Concise Oxford Dictionary of Australian History. Melbourne: Oxford University Press. ISBN 0-19-554422-6.
- Browning, Jeff; Breen, Marcus (1997). "Popular music". In Bebbington, Warren (ed.). The Oxford Companion to Australian Music. Melbourne: Oxford University Press. ISBN 0195534328.
- Castle, Josie (1982). "The 1920s". In Willis, Ray; et al. (eds.). Issues in Australian History. Melbourne: Longman Cheshire. ISBN 978-0-582663275.
- Close, John (1982). "Australians in Wartime". In Willis, Ray; et al. (eds.). Issues in Australian History. Melbourne: Longman Cheshire. ISBN 978-0-582663275.
- Crowley, Frank (1973a). Modern Australia in Documents: Volume 1 – 1901–1939. Melbourne: Wren Publishing. ISBN 0-85885-032-X.
- Crowley, Frank (1973b). Modern Australia in Documents: Volume 2 – 1939-1970. Melbourne: Wren Publishing. ISBN 0-85885-032-X.
- Davison, Graeme; Hirst, John & Macintyre, Stuart, eds. (2001). The Oxford Companion to Australian History (2nd ed.). Melbourne: Oxford University Press.
- Fitzpatrick, Peter (2009). "Australian drama, 1850-1950". In Pierce, Peter (ed.). The Cambridge History of Australian Literature. Port Melbourne: Cambridge University Press. ISBN 9780521881654.
- Gammage, Bill (1988). "The Crucible: The Establishment of the Anzac Tradition 1899–1918". In McKernan, M. & Browne, M. (eds.). Australia: Two Centuries of War and Peace. Canberra: Australian War Memorial and Allen & Unwin Australia. ISBN 0-642-99502-8.
- Garton, Stephen; Stanley, David (2013). "The Great War and its aftermath, 1914-22". In Bashford, Alison; Macintyre, Stuart (eds.). The Cambridge History of Australia, Volume 2: The Commonwealth of Australia. Port Melbourne: Cambridge University Press. ISBN 9781107011540.
- Gibb, D.M. (1973). The Making of White Australia. Melbourne: Victorian Historical Association. ISBN 978-0-950096759.
- Hirst, John (2000). The Sentimental Nation: the making of the Australian Commonwealth. South Melbourne: Oxford University Press. ISBN 0195506200.
- Hirst, John (2013). "Nation building, 1901-14". In Bashford, Alison; Macintyre, Stuart (eds.). The Cambridge History of Australia, Volume 2: The Commonwealth of Australia. Port Melbourne: Cambridge University Press. ISBN 9781107011540.
- Irving, Helen (2013). "Making the federal Commonwealth, 1890-1901". In Bashford, Alison; Macintyre, Stuart (eds.). The Cambridge History of Australia, Volume 1, Indigenous and Colonial Australia. Cambridge University Press. ISBN 978-1-1070-1153-3.
- La Nauze, J. A. (1965). Alfred Deakin: a biography. Melbourne: Melbourne University Press.
- Long, Gavin (1952). Australia in the War of 1939–1945, Series 1. Army, Volume 1: To Benghazi. Canberra: Australian War Memorial.
- Lowe, David (1995). "Australia in the World". In Beaumont, Joan (ed.). Australia's War, 1914–18. Allen & Unwin.
- Lowe, David (2013). "Security". In Bashford, Alison; Macintyre, Stuart (eds.). The Cambridge History of Australia, Volume 2: The Commonwealth of Australia. Port Melbourne: Cambridge University Press. ISBN 9781107011540.
- Macintyre, Stuart (1986). The Oxford History of Australia: Volume 4: 1901–42, the Succeeding Age. Oxford University Press.
- Macintyre, Stuart (2020). A Concise History of Australia (5th ed.). Port Melbourne: Cambridge University Press. ISBN 9781108728485.
- McMullin, Ross (1991). The Light on the Hill : the Australian Labor Party, 1891-1991. Melbourne: Oxford University Press. ISBN 0195534514.
- Robertson, John (1984). Australia Goes To War, 1939–1945. Sydney: Doubleday. ISBN 0-86824-155-5.
- Robson, Lloyd (1980). Australia in the Nineteen Twenties: Commentary and Documents. Melbourne: Nelson Publishers. ISBN 978-0-170059022.
- Sendziuk, Paul, and Robert Foster. A history of South Australia (Cambridge University Press, 2018) pp. 96–152.
- Simons, David; Broadstock, Brenton (1997). "Composition in Australia". In Bebbington, Warren (ed.). The Oxford Companion to Australian Music. Melbourne: Oxford University Press. ISBN 0195534328.
- Spenceley, Geoff (1981). The Depression Decade. Melbourne: Thomas Nelson. ISBN 0-17-006048-9.
- Thompson, Roger C. (2002). Religion in Australia: a History (2nd ed.). South Melbourne: Oxford University Press. ISBN 0195515412.
- Ward, Russel. A Nation for a Continent: The History of Australia 1901–1975 (Heinemann Educational Australia, 1977) pp 12–266..
