= Australian settlement =

The Australian settlement was a set of nation-building policies adopted in Australia at the beginning of the 20th century. The phrase was coined by journalist Paul Kelly in his 1992 book The End of Certainty. Kelly identified five policy "pillars" of the settlement: White Australia (a racially exclusive immigration policy); Protection (protective tariffs on imported manufactured goods, as embodied in the New Protection); Wage Arbitration (compulsory arbitration for industrial disputes); State Paternalism (interventionist social and economic policies); and Imperial Benevolence (faith in the British Empire). These pillars profoundly influenced the way Australia developed over the coming decades and were only dismantled towards the end of the century. The term "settlement" refers to the way this constellation of policies emerged as a compromise between major interests in Australian society at that time, namely workers and employers. It has also been referred to as the Deakinite settlement, after its principal architect Alfred Deakin.

== Background ==
Britain's Australian colonies had developed rapidly and successfully in the 19th century to become a major exporter of certain commodities, notably wool. By the 1880s they had become among the wealthiest societies in the world and had also developed unusually strong labour movements. Some manufacturing for local consumption had also become established. This was supported and promoted in the Colony of Victoria by a protective tariff that had been introduced in 1866 to help generate local employment for migrants initially attracted to the gold fields.

Over the course of the economically difficult and industrially conflictual 1890s, the six colonies agreed to federate as the Commonwealth of Australia. The establishment of a national government spanning the continent and the transfer of certain key functions to that government entailed the establishment of new national policies in regard to a range of important economic and social matters. Customs tariffs, for instance, immediately became an exclusive concern of the Commonwealth government and the Commonwealth assumed primacy in a number of other areas such as immigration.

== Decade of decision: 1901–1910 ==
There was obviously a lot of business for the new parliament in those first years after Federation took effect on 1 January 1901. The decision-making was complicated, though, by the fact that no single party enjoyed a majority until Labor took office in 1910. The three-cornered contest between Protectionist Liberals, Free Trade Liberals and the Australian Labor Party (ALP), saw the Protectionists introduce the key "Australian settlement" policies with Labor support. This began with the Immigration Restriction Act, which had support from all sides of politics, and continued through the Customs Tariff Act, the Conciliation and Arbitration Act 1904 and the Old Age Pension Act. In addition, in the Harvester Judgment the Court of Conciliation and Arbitration brought down its "living wage" determination pursuant to the New Protection principles, requiring employers to pay their workers enough to support a man and his wife and three children.

For theorist Francis Castles, implementation of these policies constituted an economic development strategy of "domestic defence" – using Australia's natural wealth to support an otherwise uncompetitive manufacturing sector, providing a good living to workers and pensions for later life.

== Dismantling ==
Dismantling the domestic defence framework began with the ending of the White Australia policy between the mid-1960s and the mid-1970s. Australia persisted, however, with other components such as tariff protectionism while other advanced economies were moving toward more open trade in the post-war years through the GATT process. Weaknesses in Australia's commodity exporting economy combined with steadily increasing competition in world manufacturing thanks to the newly industrialized countries (NICs) put that strategy under great pressure in the 1980s. Under the Hawke-Keating Labor governments (1983–96), both tariff protectionism and centralised wage fixing were wound back. As part of the campaign to liberalise the Australian economy in this period, journalist Paul Kelly coined the phrase "Australian Settlement" and blamed those early policy decisions for Australia's economic difficulties of the 1970s and 1980s. A closer examination makes that interpretation difficult to sustain, but does not alter the reality that by the late 20th century the strategy of domestic defence had become an encumbrance.

== See also ==
- American System (economic plan)
- National Policy (Canada)
