= Great Depression in Australia =

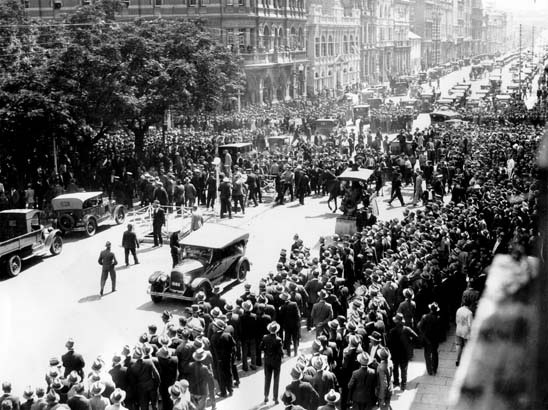
In 1931, over one thousand unemployed men marched from the Esplanade to the Treasury Building in Perth, Western Australia to see Premier Sir James Mitchell.

Australia was affected badly during the period of the Great Depression of the 1930s. The Depression began with the Wall Street crash of 1929 and rapidly spread worldwide. As in other nations, Australia had years of high unemployment, poverty, low profits, deflation, plunging incomes, and lost opportunities for economic growth and personal advancement. Australian finance had long relied on foreign investment and borrowing on the London banks; that window closed. Government policies were ineffective, and recovery came when the rest of the world recovered.

The Australian economy rested upon its place as a primary producer within the British Empire. Australia's vital export industries crashed. The price for wool and wheat fell in half, dragging down the entire national economy. Unemployment soared to a record high of around 30% in 1932. and gross domestic product declined by 10% between 1929 and 1931.

There were a few small incidents of civil unrest, particularly in Sydney. Australian Communist and far right movements were active in the Depression, but they remained on the periphery of Australian politics. They failed to achieve the power shifts obtained in Europe, as the democratic political system of the young Australian Federation survived.

The Scullin Ministry of the Australian Labor Party under James Scullin had just assumed power on 22 October thanks to success in the 1929 federal election. Three days later, "Black Thursday" would mark the start of the Wall Street crash of 1929 and the global onset of the Great Depression. The government was overwhelmed. Labor Party began to split apart. Treasurer Ted Theodore failed to implement his Keynesian inflationary plans. New South Wales Premier Jack Lang lost office over his plans to boost the budget through a temporary cessation of interest repayments. Labor defector Joseph Lyons helped shut down the Nationalist Party of Australia and form the new United Australia Party. He ousted Scullin and was Prime Minister of Australia from the 1931 federal election until his death in 1939.

Thus Australia, unlike the United States, did not embark on a significant Keynesian program of massive spending to recover from the Depression. Nevertheless, the Australian recovery began around 1932. Australians took consolation from sporting achievements through the Depression, with cricketer Don Bradman and race horse Phar Lap achieving long-lasting fame.

== 1920s: The calm before the storm ==
The Great War (World War I) had depleted Britain's savings and foreign investments, and wartime inflation had deeply upset the United Kingdom's terms of trade. A sluggish economy in Britain naturally reduced British demand for imports from Australia throughout the 1920s and this had affected Australia's balance of payments. Throughout the 1920s the Australian unemployment rate floated between 6% and 11%.

The Great War had also caused many necessary infrastructure projects to be delayed or abandoned, many of which began in the 1920s, including the Sydney Harbour Bridge and Sydney's underground railway system in addition to the Commonwealth government beginning to fund major highways. New dams and grain elevators were built, and the rural railway network was expanded in nearly every state. Large sums of government money were made available to provide returned First World War servicemen with farmland and agricultural equipment under soldier settlement schemes.

All these publicly funded projects were paid for by loans raised by both state and federal governments. Most of these loans were raised on capital markets in the City of London at an average of £30 million per annum.

== 1929: The storm erupts ==
In 1910, the federal government introduced a national currency, the Australian pound, which it pegged to the pound sterling. In effect, Australia was on the gold standard through the British peg. In 1914, Britain removed the pound sterling from the gold standard, creating inflation pressures. Britain returned the pound sterling to the gold standard in 1925 at pre-1913 parity, effectively revaluing both currencies significantly and unleashing crushing deflationary pressures and falling export demand. This had the immediate effect of making British and Australian exports far less competitive in non-British markets, and affected Australia's terms of trade.

In 1931, as an emergency measure during the Great Depression, Australia left the gold standard, resulting in a devaluation relative to sterling. A variety of pegs to sterling applied until December 1931, when the government set a rate of £1 Australian = 16 shillings sterling. This was intended to ease entry of Australian goods into the British and other linked markets.

Falling export demand and commodity prices placed massive downward pressures on wages, particularly in industries such as coal mining. Due to falling prices, bosses were unable to pay the wages that workers wanted. The result was a series of strikes in many sectors of the economy in the late 1920s. Coal miners' strikes in the winter of 1929 brought much of the economy to its knees. A riot at a picket line in the Hunter Region mining town of Rothbury saw police shoot one teenage coal miner dead.

The conservative Prime Minister of Australia, Stanley Bruce, wished to dismantle the conciliation and arbitration system of judicially supervised collective bargaining which had been the cornerstone of Australia's industrial relations system since the 1900s, which would allow employers alone to increase or decrease employee wages in response to economic and market conditions.

The opposition Australian Labor Party, led by James Scullin, successfully depicted Stanley Bruce as wanting to destroy Australia's high wages and working conditions in the 1929 federal election. Scullin was elected prime minister in a landslide which saw Stanley Bruce voted out as the member for Flinders, the only time until the 2007 federal election that a sitting prime minister lost his seat.

== 1929–1935: Scullin and Lang ==
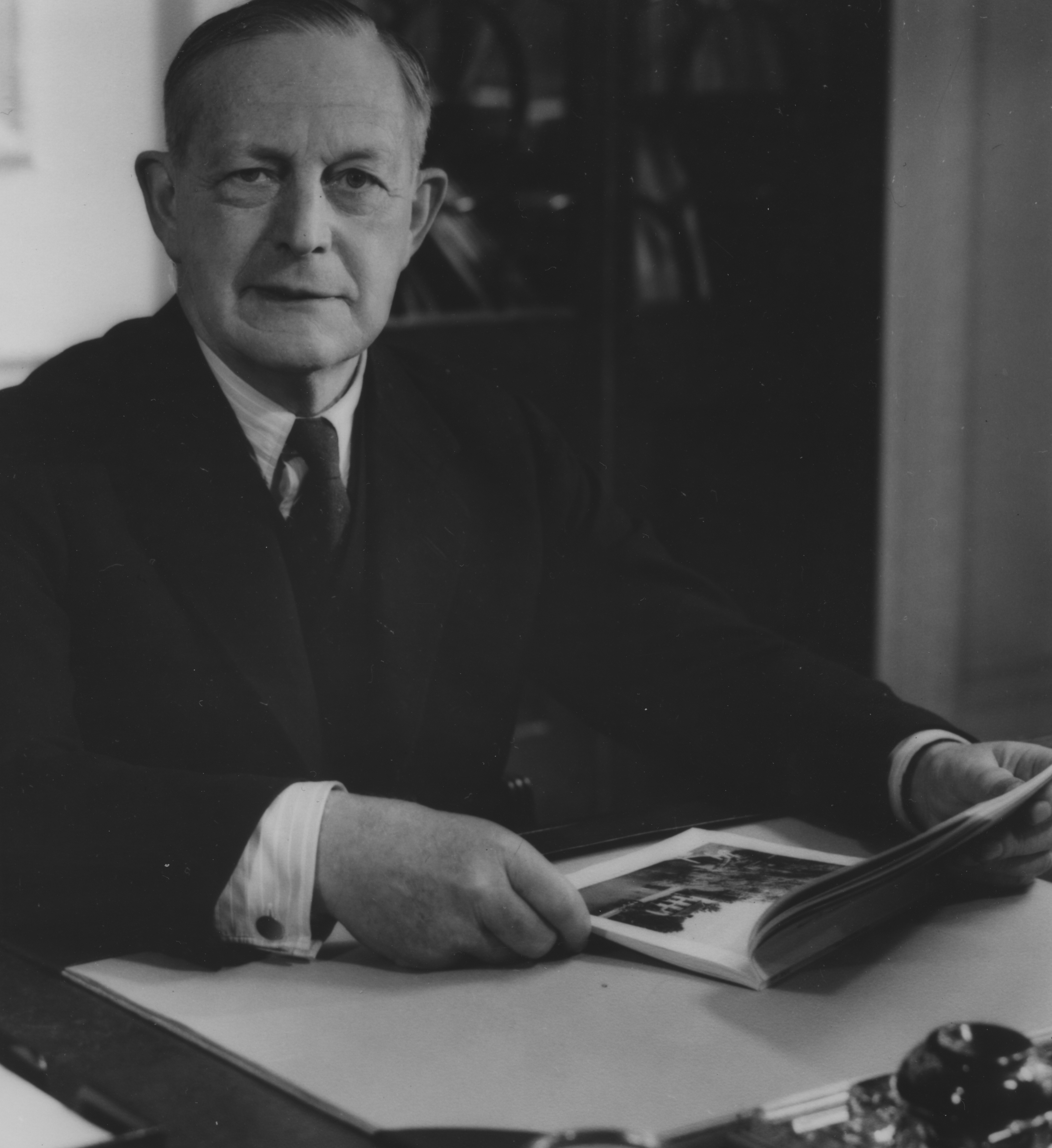
Sir Otto Niemeyer of the Bank of England advised Australian governments to pursue a deflationary economic policy and honour their debt repayments.

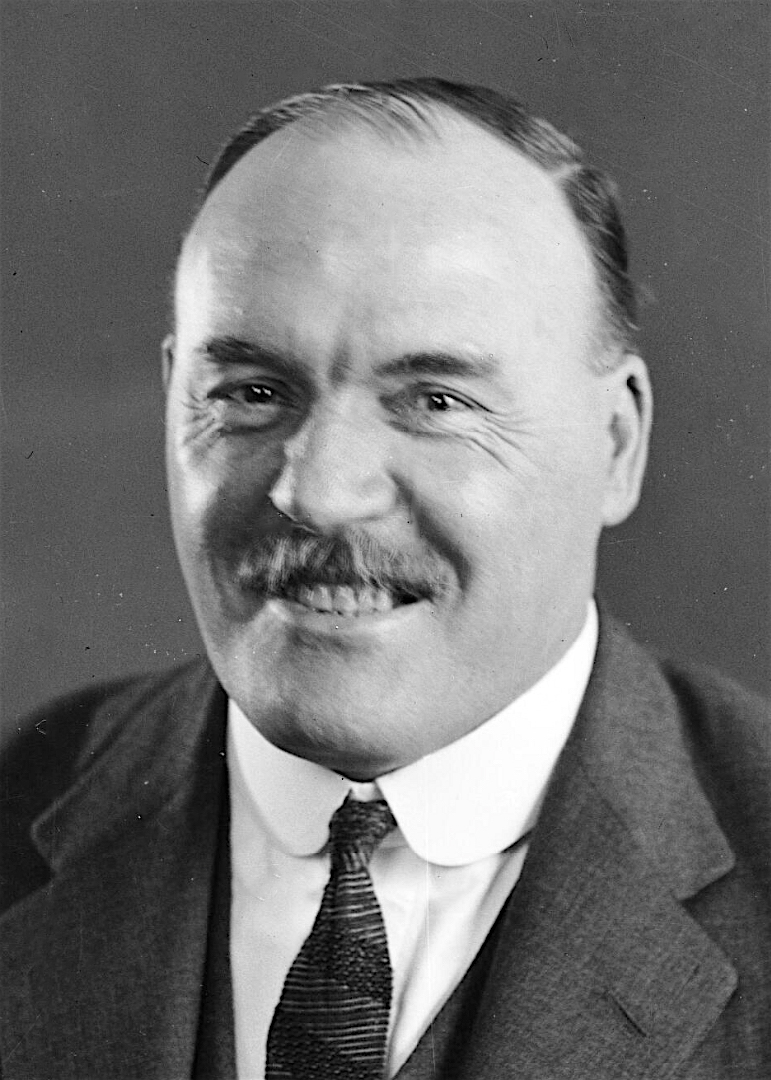
New South Wales Premier Jack Lang rejected the deflationary philosophy of the Premiers Plan and proposed to cease payments on interest on debts to Britain.

The James Scullin Labor government had just assumed power with the commencement of the Scullin Ministry on 22 October following the 1929 federal election, however just a couple of days later, Black Thursday would mark the start of the Wall Street crash of 1929 and the subsequent global onset of the Great Depression. From the outset the Scullin administration was buffeted by the effects of the global economic crisis.

Throughout Scullin's term, commodity prices continued to fall, unemployment rose, and Australia's big cities were depopulated as thousands of unemployed men took to the countryside in search of menial agricultural work. The stagnant economy had reduced economic activity and therefore tax revenues. However, the debt commitments of both state and federal governments remained the same. Australia became severely at risk of defaulting on its foreign debt which had been accumulated during the relative prosperity and infrastructure-building frenzy of the 1920s.

The Great Depression in Australia saw huge levels of unemployment and economic suffering amid plummeting export income. Although the economic downturn was a product of international events, Australian governments grappled with how to respond. Conventional economists said governments should pursue deflationary policies. Radicals proposed inflationary responses and increased government spending. Division emerged within the Labor Party over how to respond.

In August 1930, Scullin invited Sir Otto Niemeyer of the Bank of England to come to Australia to advise on economic policy. Niemeyer met with federal and state leaders at a conference in Melbourne where he recommended a traditional deflationary response of balanced budgets to combat Australia's high levels of debt and insisted that interest on loans be met. It entailed the balancing of the budget through expenditure and wage cuts, without additional overseas borrowing, necessitating reductions in social welfare programs, defence spending and other sweeping cutbacks. The premiers and Prime Minister Scullin agreed to this Melbourne Plan, which would go on to form the basis of the Premiers' Plan. Ted Theodore, Treasurer in Scullin's government, supported an inflationary policy of increased government spending in times of a recession, a view espoused in 1936 by John Maynard Keynes. The Senate and Commonwealth Bank (then also acting as the country's central bank) rejected Theodore's spending plans. The Labor Premier of New South Wales meanwhile announced the Lang Plan in February 1931, which included a temporary cessation of interest repayments on debts to Britain and that interest on all government borrowings be reduced to 3% to free up money for injection into the economy.

In 1929, as an emergency measure, Australia took the Australian pound off the gold standard, resulting in a devaluation relative to sterling. Starting in September 1930, the Australian banks began to slowly devalue the Australian pound, and a year later it had been devalued 30% against the Pound Sterling. This had the economic effect of increasing the cost of imported goods and increasing the cost of servicing government overseas debts, which were denominated in the overseas currency, typically in sterling.

Jack Lang, the Labor Party Leader of the Opposition in New South Wales and a fiery left-wing populist, campaigned vigorously against the provisions of the Melbourne Agreement. He was elected in a landslide in the NSW state election of 1930.

Scullin departed for an Imperial economic conference in London, necessitating an absence of five months, during which time he managed to secure reduced interest payments for Australia. With James Fenton as acting prime minister and Joseph Lyons as acting treasurer in his absence, Labor continued to negotiate Australia's economic response, with Fenton and Lyons advocating a more conservative fiscal approach and the unions and caucus calling for repudiation of debts.

In 1931 at an economic crisis conference in Canberra, Jack Lang issued his own programme for economic recovery. The Lang Plan advocated the repudiation of interest payments to overseas creditors until domestic conditions improved, the abolition of the Gold Standard to be replaced by a Goods Standard where the amount of money in circulation was linked to the amount of goods produced, and the immediate injection of £18 million of new money into the economy in the form of Commonwealth Bank of Australia credit. The Prime Minister and all other state premiers refused.

With the rejection of the Theodore and Lang inflationary plans, the governments of Australia met to negotiate a compromise in 1931. The resulting Premiers' Plan required the Australian federal and state governments to cut spending by 20%, including cuts to wages and pensions and was to be accompanied by tax increases, reductions in interest on bank deposits and a 22.5% reduction in the interest the government paid on internal loans.

The policy contrasted with the approach put forward by the British economist John Maynard Keynes and which was pursued by the United States, which held that governments needed to spend their way out of the Depression. The plan was signed by New South Wales Labor Premier Jack Lang, but he was a notable critic of its underlying philosophy and went on to pursue his own policy of defaulting on debt repayments, which led to confrontation with the federal Scullin and Lyons governments and resulted in the Lang Dismissal Crisis of 1932.

The Labor Party soon split into three separate factions. Jack Lang and his supporters, mainly in New South Wales, were expelled from the party and formed a left-wing splinter party officially known as the New South Wales Labor Party, commonly known as Lang Labor. The Minister for Public Works and Railways, Joseph Lyons, led a conservative faction, which believed in the deflationary approach of balanced budgets and cuts in spending and opposed defaulting on debt repayments. When the more radical Ted Theodore was reinstated as treasurer by Scullin on 29 January, Joseph Lyons and James Fenton along with three others resigned from the government, joining the opposition Nationalist Party to form the United Australia Party. The Australian Labor Party would remain in government through the parliamentary term however, with Scullin as prime minister, and except for a brief stint by Scullin, Theodore as treasurer.

== Lyons government ==
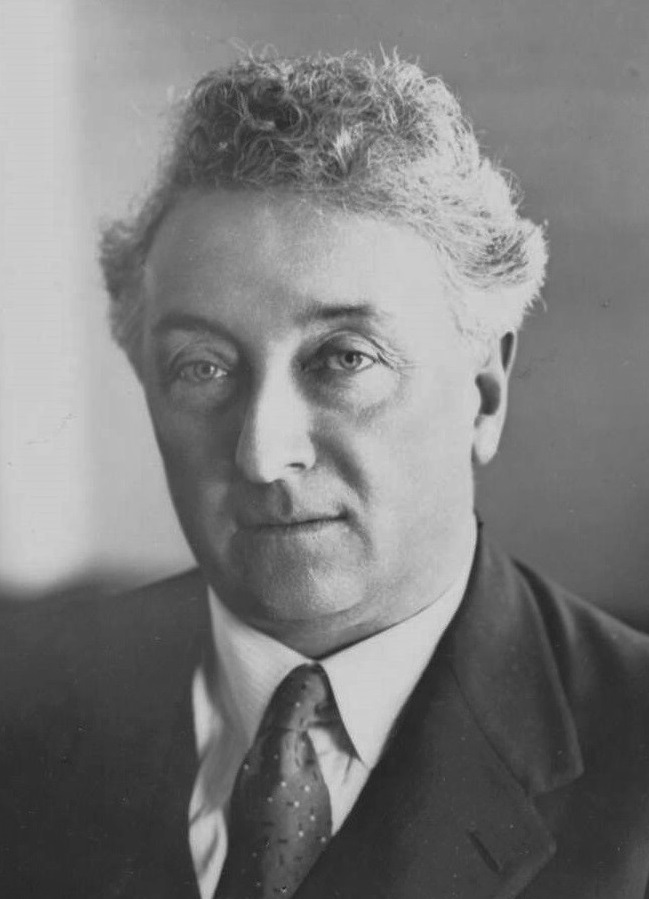
Joseph Lyons, popular United Australia Party Prime Minister from 1932 to 1939. The Lyons government supported the Premiers Plan and blocked Lang's efforts to avoid debt repayments.

The stance of Joseph Lyons and James Fenton against the far more radical proposals of the Labor movement to deal with the Depression had attracted the support of prominent Australian conservatives, known as "the Group", whose number included future prime minister Robert Menzies. In parliament on 13 March 1931, though still a member of the ALP, Lyons supported a no confidence motion against the Scullin Labor government. The United Australia Party was then formed from a coalition of citizens' groups and with the support of the Nationalist Party of Australia. Lyons quit the ALP to become parliamentary leader of the newly established United Australia Party, with John Latham, Nationalist Leader of the Opposition, becoming the new party's deputy leader.

In November 1931, Lang Labor dissidents chose to challenge the Scullin Labor government and align with the United Australia Party Opposition to pass a 'no confidence' and the government fell. At the 1931 federal election, the ALP were left with just 14 seats after losing 32 seats, though an extra 4 seats were won by NSW Lang Labor. The Lyons-led United Australia Party in Coalition with the Country Party commenced its first term of government in January 1932.

Before being voted out of office, the Scullin government had covered NSW's debt default. The federal government had paid NSW's bond installments and intended to recoup this money from the NSW Government. A dramatic episode in Australian history followed Lyons first electoral victory. When NSW premier Jack Lang refused to pay interest on overseas State debts, the Lyons government stepped in and paid the debts and then passed the Financial Agreement Enforcement Act to recover the money it had paid. In an effort to frustrate this move, Lang ordered State departments to pay all receipts directly to the Treasury instead of into Government bank accounts. The New South Wales Governor, Sir Philip Game, intervened on the basis that Lang had acted illegally in breach of the state Audit Act and sacked the Lang Government, who then suffered a landslide loss at the subsequent 1932 state election.

Australia would recover relatively quickly from the global financial downturn, with recovery beginning around 1932. Lyons pursued an orthodox fiscal policy, favouring the deflationary economic measures of the Premiers' Plan, and refused to accept NSW premier Jack Lang's proposals to default on overseas debt repayments. Australia entered the Depression with a debt crisis and a credit crisis. According to author Anne Henderson of the conservative Sydney Institute, Lyons held a steadfast belief in "the need to balance budgets, lower costs to business and restore confidence" and the Lyons period gave Australia "stability and eventual growth" between the drama of the Depression and the outbreak of the Second World War. A lowering of wages was enforced and industry tariff protections maintained, which together with cheaper raw materials during the 1930s saw a shift from agriculture to manufacturing as the chief employer of the Australian economy – a shift which was consolidated by increased investment by the commonwealth government into defence and armaments manufacture. Lyons saw restoration of Australia's exports as the key to economic recovery. A devalued Australian currency assisted in restoring a favourable balance of trade.

== Economic impact ==
National income fell by a third, leading to widespread poverty. Many people lost their savings and homes, and business bankruptcies were common. The cash value of Australia's exports fell dramatically, as both the amount shipped and the prices paid declined. The result was a significant trade imbalance. The government was helpless. It could do little to change the effects of the slump and the tough economic times ahead.

One isolated pocket of economic prosperity over the 1930s was the Western Australian Goldfields, which boomed as a result of the surging gold price.

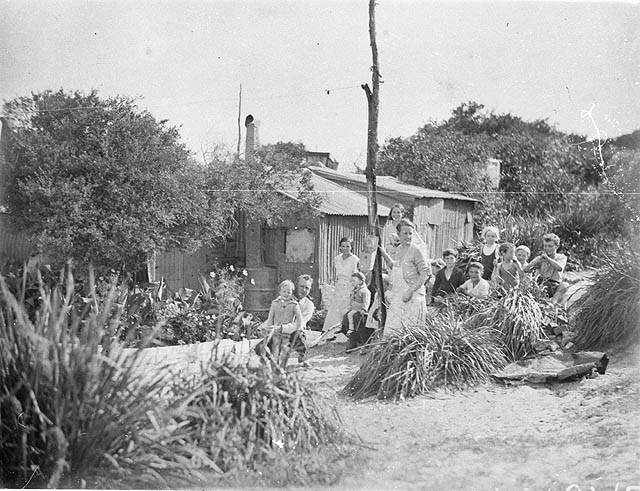
'Happy Valley' at Brighton-le-Sands, Sydney, in 1934

=== Unemployment ===
Because of the severe economic contraction, the reduction of purchasing goods, employers couldn't afford to keep excessive workers. A five-year unemployment average for 1930–34 was 23.4%, with a peak of about 30% in 1932. This was one of the most severe unemployment rates in the industrialised world, exceeded only by Germany.

There was increased movement of many people to and from country areas in search of work. City and urban people planted gardens to produce fruit and vegetables. In some urban areas co-operatives were formed based on barter systems to share what was available. Single unemployed men had to make do in informal camps or makeshift hostels in disused buildings, such as the old Redfern Fish Market.

Many hundreds of thousands of Australians suddenly faced the humiliation of poverty and unemployment. This was still the era of traditional social family structure, where the man was expected to be the sole bread winner. Soup kitchens and charity groups made brave attempts to feed the destitute. At night many slept covered in newspapers at Sydney's Domain or at Salvation Army refuges.

The limited jobs that did arise were fought for. Job vacancies were advertised in the daily newspaper, which formed massive queues to search for any job available. This then caused a race to arrive first at the place of employment, that person usually being the one hired. This is depicted in the Australian film Caddie.

Many Australians campaigned at a community level through organisations such as the Unemployed Workers Movement to demand improved welfare and relief. Authorities often attempted to repress protest through the use of repressive laws including bans on street marches and free speech. These in turn were resisted by campaigns of civil resistance, with Melbourne social realist artist Noel Counihan famously speaking from inside a cage to prevent arrest. Overall campaigning was successful in terms of gaining improved welfare and relief as well as in disrupting and preventing housing evictions across Australia.

=== Sustenance ===
In common parlance, The Susso (for "sustenance payments") was a one or other of several (welfare) payments, also used attributively; often unsympathetically, and was modest in the extreme – enough by careful management to avoid death by starvation.

By 1932, more than 60,000 people depended on "the susso", merely to survive. This was only for the truly destitute, who had been unemployed for a sustained period of time, and had no assets or savings. Relief was state-based; in South Australia, it was in the form of rations and vouchers. At a time when the basic wage was £2/11/8d, "the susso" in Queensland was 3s. to 4/6d per child. "Many spend more than that on a dog", one speaker was quoted as saying. Numerous campaigns took place around Australia in which community members carried out protests over inadequate levels of sustenance and the invasive and patronising treatment of recipients. In many cases these forced authorities to make improvements.

It was immortalised in the children's rhyme, following the song "You're in the Army Now":

We're on the susso now,
We can’t afford a cow,
We live in a tent,
We pay no rent,
We're on the susso now|

== Sports ==
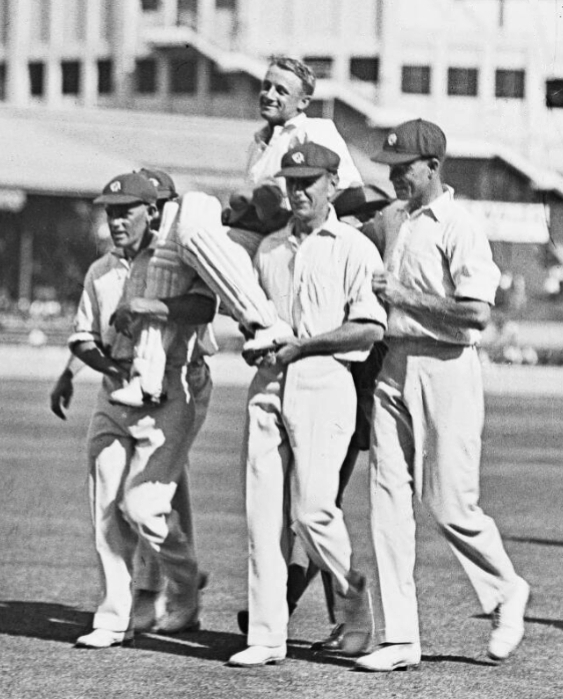
Don Bradman is chaired off the cricket pitch in 1930.

There were sporting successes that boosted the spirits of Australians during the economic downturn. In a Sheffield Shield cricket match at the Sydney Cricket Ground in 1930, Don Bradman, a young New South Welshman of just 21 years of age wrote his name into the record books by smashing the previous highest batting score in first-class cricket with 452 runs not out in just 415 minutes. The rising star's world-beating cricketing exploits were to provide much needed joy to Australians through the emerging Great Depression and Post World War One recovery.

Between 1929 and 1931 the racehorse Phar Lap dominated Australia's racing industry, at one stage winning fourteen races in a row. Famous victories included the 1930 Melbourne Cup, following an assassination attempt and carrying 9 stone 12 pounds weight. Phar Lap sailed for the United States in 1931, going on to win North America's richest race, the Agua Caliente Handicap in Tijuana, Mexico, in 1932. Soon after, on the cusp of US success, Phar Lap developed suspicious symptoms and died. Theories swirled that the champion race horse had been poisoned and a devoted Australian public went into shock.

The 1938 British Empire Games were held in Sydney at the Cricket Ground from 5–12 February, timed to coincide with Sydney's sesqui-centenary (150 years since the foundation of British settlement in Australia).

== 1932–1939: A slow recovery ==
Unlike the United States, where Franklin Roosevelt's inflationary New Deal attempted to stimulate the American economy, New Zealand where Michael Savage's pioneering welfare state tried to reduce hardship, or the United Kingdom where rearmament (from 1936) increased deficit spending, there was no significant mechanism for inflationary Keynesian economic policy responses in Australia.

Australia's recovery during the 1930s was led by the manufacturing sector.

Federation in 1901 had granted only limited power to the federal government. For example, income taxes were collected by the State governments. Some argued that Australia's protectionist high tariffs worked to hurt the economy and that influential interest groups sought no change in this aspect of policy. Additionally, there was no significant banking reform or nationalisation of private businesses.

The devaluation of the Australian pound, abandonment of the Gold Standard, recovery of major trading partners like the United Kingdom and public works projects instituted by state and local governments led to a slow recovery. Unemployment was still 11% in 1939.

== Legacy of the Great Depression in Australia ==
Following Lyons' death in 1939, Robert Menzies assumed the United Australia Party leadership and the prime ministership, however the 1940 federal election resulted in a hung parliament. A year later, Menzies' minority government was brought down in the House of Representatives when the two independents crossed the floor and switched their support to Labor John Curtin led the government during World War II. At the 1943 federal election, Curtin led Labor to their greatest House of Representatives victory both in terms of proportion of seats and their strongest national two-party vote. Curtin died in 1945, and was succeeded as Labor leader and prime minister by Ben Chifley, who led Labor to victory in the 1946 federal election, and to defeat at the 1949 federal election.

Curtin and Chifley, who often used the spectre of another depression in their campaign rhetoric, utilised emergency wartime powers to introduce a command economy in Australia based on Keynesian principles. Unemployment was virtually eliminated in this period, being reduced to a record low of 1.1%. In 1942, income tax became federally controlled with the states conceding that the war effort needed a centrally controlled financial basis.

In 1944, Curtin announced the plan for a white paper on full employment. This white paper served a variety of roles; to establish the priority of full employment; to ensure the depression would not recur; and to propose ways to make these objectives possible. The economic theories proposed by J M Keynes in 1936 were a major influence on the white paper.

Chifley argued that the risk of another depression could be minimized by nationalising the banks. This was denounced as socialism but it passed Parliament. The High Court said it was invalid and it never happened.

== See also ==
- Economic history of Australia

== Bibliography ==
- Beaumont, Joan (2022). Australia's Great Depression : How a Nation Shattered by the Great War Survived the Worst Economic Crisis It Has Ever Faced. Sydney. ISBN 978-1-76106-374-9. OCLC 1306054776.
- Boehm, E. A. Twentieth century economic development in Australia (1971) online
- Broomhill, Ray. Unemployed workers: A social history of the Great Depression in Adelaide (Queensland University Press, 1979).
- Copland, Douglas. Australia in the world crisis, 1929-1933 (1934) online
- Dyster, Barrie, and David Meredith. Australia in the International Economy in the Twentieth Century (Cambridge University Press, 1990) pp.72–160.
- Gregory, Robert G. and Noel G. Butlin, eds. Recovery from the Depression: Australia and the World Economy in the 1930s (Cambridge University Press, 1988).
- Kelly, Paul (2001). 100 years, The Australian Story. ABC Books.
- Louis L.J. and Turner, Ian. The Depression of the 1930s (Cassell, 1968).
- Macintyre, Stuart. The Oxford History of Australia: Volume 4, the Succeeding Age 1901–1942 (Oxford University Press 1986) pp.251–324.
- Maclaurin, William Rupert. Economic planning in Australia, 1929-1936 (1937) online
- Millmow, Alex. "The power of economic ideas: Australian economists in the Thirties." History of Economics Review 37.1 (2003): 84-99.
- Schedvin, C.B. Australia and the Great Depression. A Study of Economic Development and Policy in the 1920s and 1930s. (1970) A standard scholarly history.
- Schedvin, C.B. "The Long and the Short of Depression Origins" Labour History , no. 17, 1969, pp. 1–13.
- Sheldon, Peter. "State‐level basic wages in Australia during the Depression, 1929–35: Institutions and politics over markets." Australian Economic History Review 47.3 (2007): 249-277.
- Siriwardana, Mahinda. " Recovery from the 1930s Great Depression. In Australia" Policy (1994). online
- Snooks, G. D. Depression and recovery in Western Australia, 1928/29-1938/39: a study in cyclical and structural change (U of Western Australia Press. 1974). review of this book
- Valentine, T.J. "The Depression of the 1930s", in Rodney Maddock and Ian McLean (eds), The Australian Economy in the Long Run (Cambridge University Press, 1987), pp. 61–77.
- Ward, Russel. The history of Australia: the twentieth century (1977) pp. 163–227 online

=== Primary sources. ===
- "Australians – Historical Statistics"
- Crowley. F. K. ed. Modern Australia in Documents: volume 1 1901–1939. (1973) pp.446–592. online
- Haig, Bryan. “New Estimates of Australian GDP, 1868-1948/49.” Australian Economic History Review 41#1 (2001): 1-34.
- Lowenstein, Wendy, ed. Weevils in the flour: An oral record of the 1930s depression in Australia (1978).
- Spenceley, G. ed. The depression decade commentary and documents (1981).
