= R v Barger =

Judgement of the High Court of Australia

- Court: High Court of Australia
- Full case name: The King and the Minister of State for the Commonwealth Administering the Customs v Barger; The Commonwealth and A. W. Smart, Collector of Customs v McKay
- Decided: 26 June 1908
- Citations: [1908] HCA 43, (1908) 6 CLR 41

Case history
- Related action: Ex Parte H.V. McKay (Harvester case) (1907) 2 CAR 1

Court membership
- Judges sitting: Griffith CJ, Barton, O'Connor, Isaacs & Higgins JJ

Case opinions
- (3:2) the Excise Tariff Act 1906 was invalid as: (1) it was not in substance a tax; (2) even if it was a tax, the Act dealt with matters other than taxation; & (3) it interfered with matters reserved exclusively to the States. per Griffith CJ, Barton and O'Connor JJ

R v Barger is a 1908 High Court of Australia case where the majority held that the taxation power could not be used by the Australian Parliament to indirectly regulate the working conditions of workers. In this case, an excise tariff was imposed on manufacturers, with an exemption being available for those who paid "fair and reasonable" wages to their employees. The ruling largely struck down the legislative basis for the Deakin government's New Protection policy, which sought to link government support for industry with labour conditions.

== Background ==
The first decade after the Federation of Australia saw a series of minority governments until the 1910 election. The Protectionist Party formed the first government with the support of the Labour Party, on the understanding that the Protectionists would implement a number of social reforms desired by Labor. In 1906 the second Deakin government was in power, with support from Labour. Prime Minister Alfred Deakin's New Protection policy provided tariff protection to employers in exchange for 'fair and reasonable' wages for employees.

Isaac Isaacs was the Attorney-General in Deakin's government. The secretary of the Attorney-General's Department, Sir Robert Garran, later recalled that Isaacs "had a remarkably keen brain but it was apt to be sometimes too subtle for my liking. When we were drafting a bill whose constitutionality was not beyond doubt, his devices to conceal any possible want of power were sometimes so ingenious as to raise, rather than evade, suspicion".

H. B. Higgins was a member of the Protectionist Party, but was in broad agreement with the Labour Party social reforms. When the Labour Party sought to amend the Conciliation and Arbitration Bill to cover State railway employees, Higgins was one of the radicals who supported the amendments and helped bring down Deakin's government. When Labour formed a minority government in 1904, Higgins became Attorney-General in the Labour ministry, because Labour had no suitably qualified lawyer in Parliament.

Both Isaacs and Higgins had previously been members of the Parliament of Victoria and in 1896 supported the trial introduction of a minimum wage. In October 1906 Isaacs and Higgins were each appointed to the High Court, setting up a clash between the three inaugural 'federalist' judges, Griffith CJ, Barton & O'Connor JJ, and the two 'nationalist' judges, Isaacs & Higgins JJ. All five judges had been leading participants in the Constitutional Conventions and all are properly seen as among the framers of the Constitution. In 1907 O'Connor J resigned as President of the Commonwealth Court of Conciliation and Arbitration and was replaced by Higgins J.

=== Customs and Excise payable on Harvesters ===
The Commonwealth government introduced two bill that would become the Customs Tariff Act 1906, and the Excise Tariff Act 1906, Both Isaacs and Higgins spoke in support of the bills that imposed custom and excise duties that were payable on certain agricultural machinery, including stripper harvesters. The Excise Tariff Act 1906 contained a proviso that the excise would not be payable if the manufacturer paid "fair and reasonable" wages as follows:

Provided that this Act shall not apply to goods manufactured by any person in any part of the Commonwealth under conditions as to remuneration of labour which—

1. are declared by resolution of both Houses of Parliament to be fair and reasonable; or
2. are in accordance with an industrial award under the Commonwealth Conciliation and Arbitration Act 1904; or
3. are in accordance with the terms of an industrial agreement filed under the Commonwealth Conciliation and Arbitration Act 1904; or
4. are, on an application made for the purpose to the President of the Commonwealth Court of Conciliation and Arbitration, declared to be fair and reasonable by him or by a Judge of the Supreme Court of a State or any person or persons who compose a State Industrial Authority to whom he may refer the matter.

=== The Harvester case ===
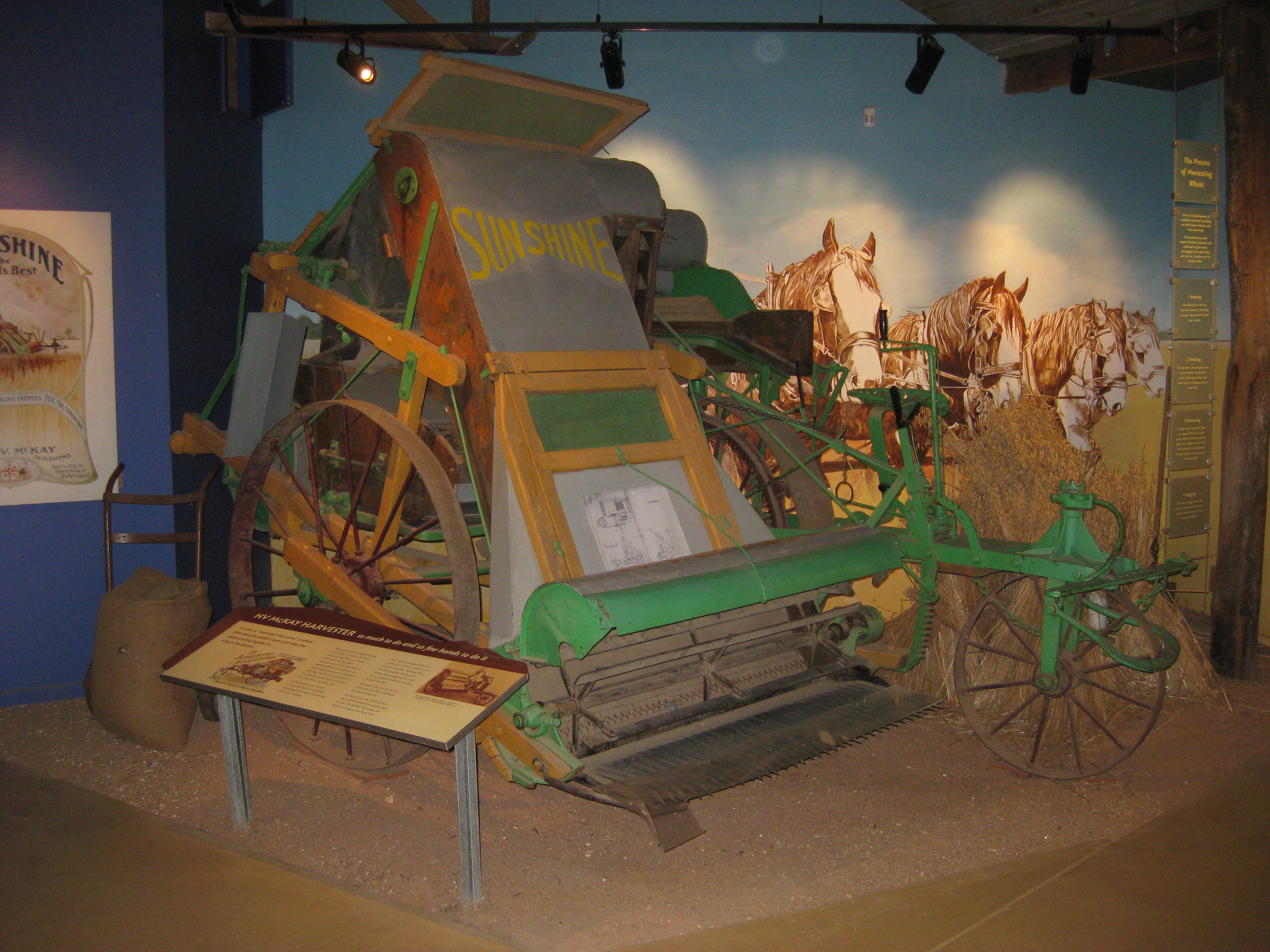
Sunshine Harvester on display at the Campaspe Run Rural Discovery Centre, Elmore, Victoria, Australia.

Hugh Victor McKay, one of Australia's largest employers, owned the Sunshine Harvester Works where agricultural machinery was built. In 1907 McKay applied to the Commonwealth Court of Conciliation and Arbitration for a declaration that the wages at his factory were "fair and reasonable". McKay admitted that he was in a position to pay whatever the court found to be fair and reasonable wages. Higgins J heard the application and submissions were made by unions and other large manufacturers. Higgins J determined that the minimum wage for unskilled workers should be 7 shillings per day and published a schedule of fair and reasonable wages called "The Excise Tariff Standard for Time-work". Higgins J declared that the wages paid by McKay were not fair and reasonable in so far as they fell below that standard.

=== The prosecutions ===
Despite the declaration in the Harvester case, McKay did not increase the wages paid to his employees to the minimum that Higgins J had declared to be fair and reasonable, nor did he pay the excise specified in the Excise Act 1906. Both McKay and another manufacturer of agricultural machinery in Melbourne, William Barger, were prosecuted by the Commonwealth for failing to pay the excise. The defences of Barger and McKay included an objection that the Excise Act 1906 was invalid. That objection was referred to the Full Court of the High Court for hearing. The argument for Barger and McKay was that although the Act on its face purports to be an exercise of the taxation power, the real substance and effect of the Act was with respect to the conditions and remuneration of labour. The State of Victoria obtained leave to intervene in both cases and similarly argued the Excise Act 1906 was invalid. The Commonwealth argued that the Act was an exercise of the taxation power and there could be no issue of reserved powers as the excise power was exclusive to the Commonwealth.

The issues before the High Court were whether the Excise Act 1906 :

1. was in substance an excise tax;
2. discriminated between States or parts of States;
3. dealt with a matter other than taxation; and
4. interfered with matters reserved exclusively to the States.

== Decision ==
The Court had to consider whether the Commonwealth had power to indirectly regulate the working conditions of workers under section 51(ii) of the Australian Constitution. The Court was divided 3:2 and the division in the Court can be seen as a continuation of the debate in the constitutional conventions about the nature of the federal system and the legislative powers of the new Commonwealth. While the doctrine of reserved powers permeated the decision of the majority, Grifith CJ, Barton & O'Connor JJ, it is not clear that the decision rested solely on that doctrine.

=== Was the Act in substance an excise? ===
==== Grifith CJ, Barton and O'Connor JJ ====
Their Honours held that the Excise Tariff Act 1906 was invalid because it was not in substance a tax, but rather an impermissible attempt to regulate the conditions of manufacture, and that went beyond extent of the taxation power. Their Honours approached the substance of the Act by considering the position of the States, which could directly regulate the wages of employees in manufacturing, and could enforce that with a penalty for non-compliance. A State could not impose an excise as this power was exclusive to the Commonwealth. It followed in their Honour's judgement that such a penalty, even if calculated by reference to the quantity of articles manufactured, was not an excise, where the purpose was "not to raise money for the purposes of government, but to regulate the conditions of labour". The Excise Tariff Act was held to be in substance a regulation of the manufacture". The decision in this respect has been criticised as a collapse into formalism, holding that 'motive' and 'consequences' were irrelevant while the 'purpose apparent on its face' was relevant. Further a particular tax may have more than one objective.

==== Isaacs and Higgins JJ ====
Isaacs J rejected the substance argument, holding that in the absence of the proviso, the Excise Tariff Act was clearly a tax on the specified machinery, that the proviso did not remove that characterisation and the reason of the legislature was irrelevant to validity.

Higgins J also rejected the substance argument, holding that as the Act imposed a tax on the production or manufacture of commodities, it was an excise tax, which the Federal Parliament could impose and the State Parliaments could not. The claim the real substance of the act was the regulation of wages referred to either the motives or the legislators or to the consequences of the legislation, neither of which were matters for the Court.

=== Discrimination between the states ===
Section 51(ii) of the Constitution provides that in making laws with respect to taxation, the Commonwealth cannot "discriminate between States of parts of States". This was the first occasion this issue had been considered by the High Court, although Griffith CJ had previously handed down a decision whilst Chief Justice of Queensland that an excise which exempted goods on which customs or excise duties had been paid under state legislation did not discriminate between the states, holding that "[i]f the imposition of these duties leads to an inequality, it is not a defect in the Federal law; it arises from the fact that the laws of the States were different, which is quite another thing" This decision was affirmed on appeal by the Privy Council. which held that "The rule laid down by the Act is a general one, applicable to all the States alike, and the fact that it operates unequally in the several States arises not from anything done by the Parliament, but from the inequality of the duties imposed by the States themselves".

==== Grifith CJ, Barton and O'Connor JJ ====
The primary finding of the majority was that the Excise Tariff Act was not a law with respect to taxation. Thus the question of whether it discriminated between States could only arise on the hypothesis that the primary finding was wrong and the law was "with respect to taxation". Their Honours held that "The words 'States or parts of States' must be read as synonymous with 'parts of the Commonwealth' or 'different localities within the Commonwealth.'" Because the Conciliation and Arbitration Act required the Court to have regard to local circumstances, it followed that the wages payable under an award "might vary according to the area within which the manufacture was carried on." and that this was an invalid attempt to authorise discrimination between States and parts of States. In the converse situation to that considered in Colonial Sugar Refining Company Limited v Irving "if the Excise duty had been made to vary in inverse proportion to the Customs duties in the several States so as to make the actual incidence of the burden practically equal, that would have been a violation of the rule of uniformity".

==== Isaacs and Higgins JJ ====
There are two propositions within the judgment of Isaacs J. The first, later to assume orthodoxy, was that "Discrimination between localities in the widest sense means that, because one man or his property is in one locality, then, regardless of any other circumstance, he or it is to be treated differently from the man or similar property in another locality". The second proposition was more controversial, in which Isaacs J sought to distinguish parts of a State from parts of the Commonwealth, holding that section 51(i), when read in conjunction with section 99, did not require taxation to be uniform throughout the Commonwealth, instead "that the treatment that is forbidden, discrimination or preference, is in relation to the localities considered as parts of States, and not as mere Australian localities, or parts of the Commonwealth considered as a single country". This followed the line of reasoning apparent from his earlier statements in Parliament when introducing the Excise Tariff Act, that States Wages Boards and Arbitration Courts could not be recognised as setting 'fair & reasonable' wages without discriminating between the States because they depended on State lines which must be forgotten for the purpose of taxation. The Commonwealth could recognise different rates in different parts of Australia, but not as different State rates. This distinction was one that Dixon CJ described in 1958 as something he had the "greatest difficulty in grasping".

Higgins J reasoned along similar lines to Isaacs J and observed that it would not be discrimination between States or parts of States if a graduated income tax were introduced when incomes were higher in one State than in another.

=== Dealing with a matter other than taxation ===
Section 55 of the constitution provides that "laws imposing duties of excise shall deal with duties of excise only" and that "any provision therein dealing with any other matter shall be of no effect." Thus if taken literally the effect of s 55 would be that the excise was valid, but the proviso which exempted certain manufacturers from paying the excise was of no effect. The suggestion that the exemption would be of no effect was dealt with in short form by the majority, holding that "The proviso in the Act in question cannot, of course, be regarded as 'of no effect,' for to do so would be 'to make a new law, not to enforce an old one'."

Consistent with their opinions that the Excise Act was in substance a tax, neither Isaacs J nor Higgins J needed to deal with the effect of dealing with any other matter. Higgins J put it succinctly that "this Act deals only with the imposition of taxation; it taxes, and it defines the persons to be exempted from the tax. This is all it does. There is no "provision therein dealing with any other matter." There is no obligation laid on anyone to do anything except to pay the tax."

=== Reserved Powers ===
==== Grifith CJ, Barton and O'Connor JJ ====
The conclusion of the majority was reached in the shadow of the reserved powers doctrine, in which the grants of power to the Commonwealth in the Constitution should be read in a restrictive way so as to preserve areas that had been intentionally left as the responsibility of the States. In the course of argument, Griffith CJ stated "The express power given to the Commonwealth Parliament to deal with foreign and inter-state trade and commerce implies a prohibition against interfering with interstate trade and commerce, and that must be remembered in dealing with the other powers given." The majority described the applicable rule in this case as "different, but ... founded upon the same principles", concluding that the power of taxation could not be exercised so as to operate as a direct interference in the internal affairs of the States.

==== Isaacs and Higgins JJ ====
Isaacs J strongly opposed the reserved powers doctrine, holding "There can be no derogations from the grant expressly made, except those which are expressly stated or which of necessity inhere. It is an inherent consequence of the division of powers between governmental authorities that neither authority is to hamper or impede the other in the exercise of their respective powers, but that doctrine has no relation to the extent of the powers themselves; it assumes the delimitation aliunde. It is contrary to reason to shorten the expressly granted powers by the undefined residuum".

Higgins J similarly rejected the reserved powers doctrine stating "To say that the Federal Parliament cannot make a law because legislation on the subject belongs to the States is rather to invert the true position. The Commonwealth has certain powers, and as to those powers it is supreme; the State has the rest. We must find what the Commonwealth powers are before we can say what the State powers are".

== Analysis ==
The decision was made before the Engineers case in 1920 swept away the reserved State powers doctrine. The doctrine had been established and affirmed in earlier cases by the original High Court Bench (Griffith CJ, Barton and O'Connor JJ) who were the majority in this decision.

The beginnings of the overturning of the doctrine were already evident in the dissenting decision of Isaacs and Higgins, who held that neither the purpose nor the effects of the Act were a valid objection for the exercise of the taxation power. Simply because the law had another purpose did not mean that the law was not one with respect to taxation. The taxation power is a non-purposive power, hence any law that could be encapsulated under the subject matter of taxation would be valid under section 52(ii). The dissent also brought up the notion of dual-characterisation – that a law could be characterised several different ways. As long as at least one of the characterisations is pursuant to a head of power, the law would be constitutionally valid.

== See also ==
- Constitutional basis of taxation in Australia
- Australian constitutional law
