= Compulsory arbitration =

Compulsory arbitration is arbitration of labor disputes which laws of some communities force the two sides, labor and management, to undergo. These laws mostly apply when the possibility of a strike seriously affects the public interest. Some labor contracts make specific provisions for compulsory arbitration should the two sides fail to reach agreement through the regular system of collective bargaining.

== Compulsory arbitration in Australia ==
The Australian Conciliation and Arbitration Act 1904 introduced the rule of law in industrial relations for Australia by establishing the Commonwealth Court of Conciliation and Arbitration.

Since 1906 Australia has enforced a system of compulsory arbitration between employers and employees. This statutory system of arbitration, the Industrial Relations Court or Commission, and the Harvester court case underpin the Australian industrial relations system.

This system has been amended since 1983. The former Liberal Party government, led by John Howard, sought to further modify it through WorkChoices. The former Labor government, during the Rudd-Gillard era, sought to re-establish regulation surrounding compulsory arbitration of Australia's industrial relations regime through other means.

== See also ==
- Trade union
- Industrial arbitration
