= Sydney James Butlin =

Australian economist and historian

Sydney James Christopher Lyon Butlin (1910–1977) was an Australian economist and historian. He was born on 20 October 1910 in Eastwood, a suburb of Sydney, the second of six children of Australian-born parents, Thomas Lyon Butlin, an orchard farmer and railway porter and Sara Mary, née Chantler. He is the brother of notable economic historian, Noel George Butlin (1921–1991).

== Early life ==
Around 1916, Butlin moved with his family to Singleton, where he attended public school. He went on to attend East Maitland Boys' High School (1923–27), where he was awarded dux. In 1926, when Butlin was 16 years old, his father was killed in a hit-and-run accident, leaving his wife and children penniless. This led to Butlin becoming the financial head of the household, with his mother and older sisters taking in washing to support the family.

== Career ==
Butlin was awarded a public exhibition in 1928 and enrolled in economics at the University of Sydney (B.Ec., 1932). After being awarded many travelling scholarships, he entered Trinity College, Cambridge (B.A., 1934; M.A., 1939), where he gained the following accolades: Economics (first place, high distinction), English (second place, high distinction), the Frank Albert Prize for general proficiency and the Chamber of Commerce Prize for the best degree pass.

Butlin pioneered the historical study of Australian money and banking according to rigorous professional standards. He was a member of the Faculty of Economics at the University of Sydney from 1935 and accepted a personal chair at The Australian University in 1971, where he finished his working career.

== Publications ==
He is the author and co-author of several seminal works in the fields of economics and history, including:

- Foundations of the Australian Monetary System 1788–1851 — S. J. Butlin (Melbourne, 1953)
- 'Australia in the War of 1939–1945 : Volume III — War Economy, 1939–1942' — S. J. Butlin (1955)
- 'Australia in the War of 1939–1945 : Volume IV — War Economy, 1942–1945' — S. J. Butlin and C. B. Schedvin (1977)
- 'Australia and New Zealand Bank' — S. J. Butlin (1961)
- 'The Australian Monetary System, 1851–1914' — S. J. Butlin [published posthumously by his daughter] (Sydney, 1986)

== Death ==
Butlin died of a ruptured abdominal aortic aneurysm on 14 December 1977 at the Royal North Shore Hospital, Sydney, and was cremated. He was survived by his wife, son and daughter.
