= New Protection =

Australian economic policy

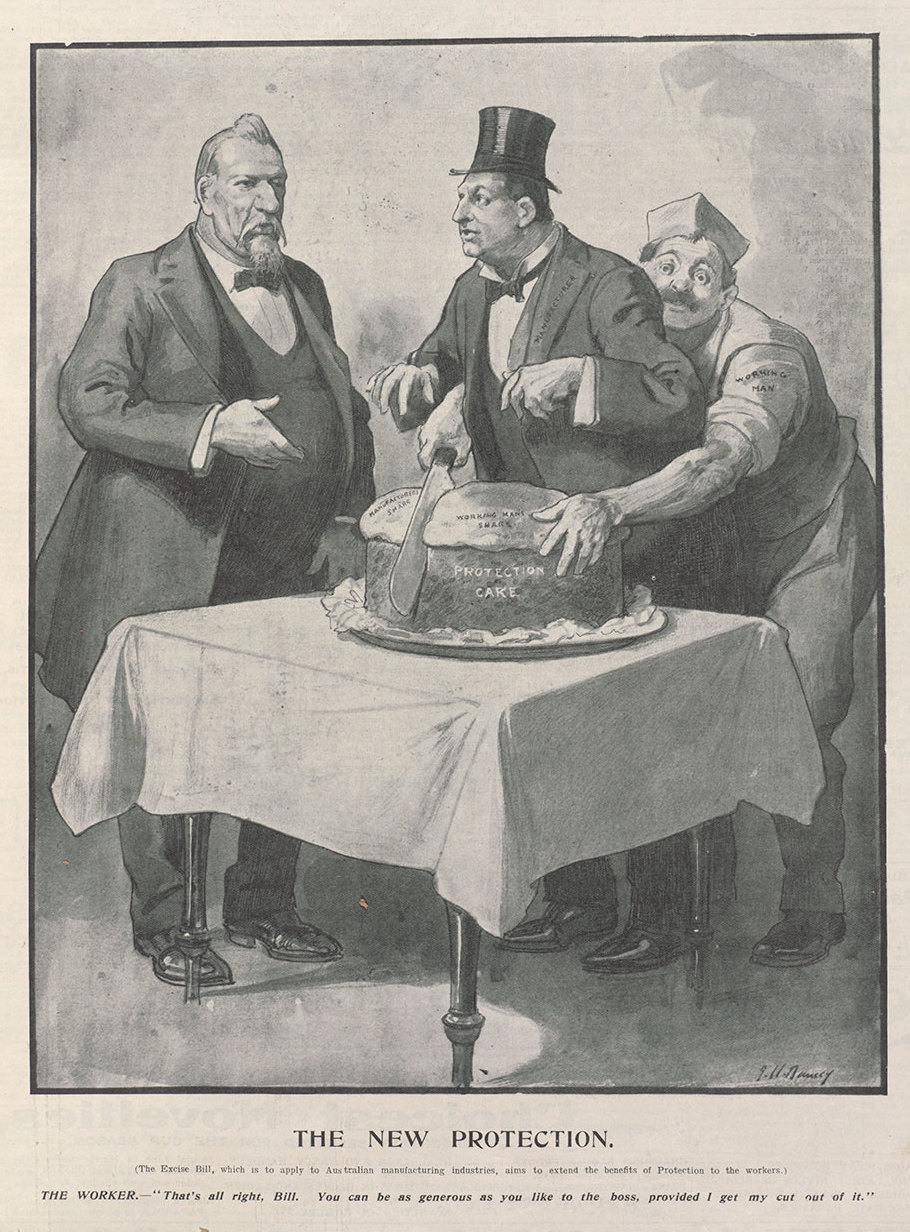
1907 cartoon by George Dancey showing a "working man" sneaking a slice of "protection cake", as customs minister William Lyne watches on

The New Protection was an economic policy introduced by the Australian Government in the early 20th century, in the first decade after Federation in 1901. It made government support for industry – including tariff protection and relief from excise taxes – contingent on employers paying "fair and reasonable" wages.

In the Harvester case of 1907, Judge H. B. Higgins of the Commonwealth Court of Conciliation and Arbitration held that a "fair and reasonable" wage required a living wage. However, in R v Barger the High Court of Australia held that the Harvester Act contravened the constitutional limits on the federal government's taxation power.

== Background and political context ==
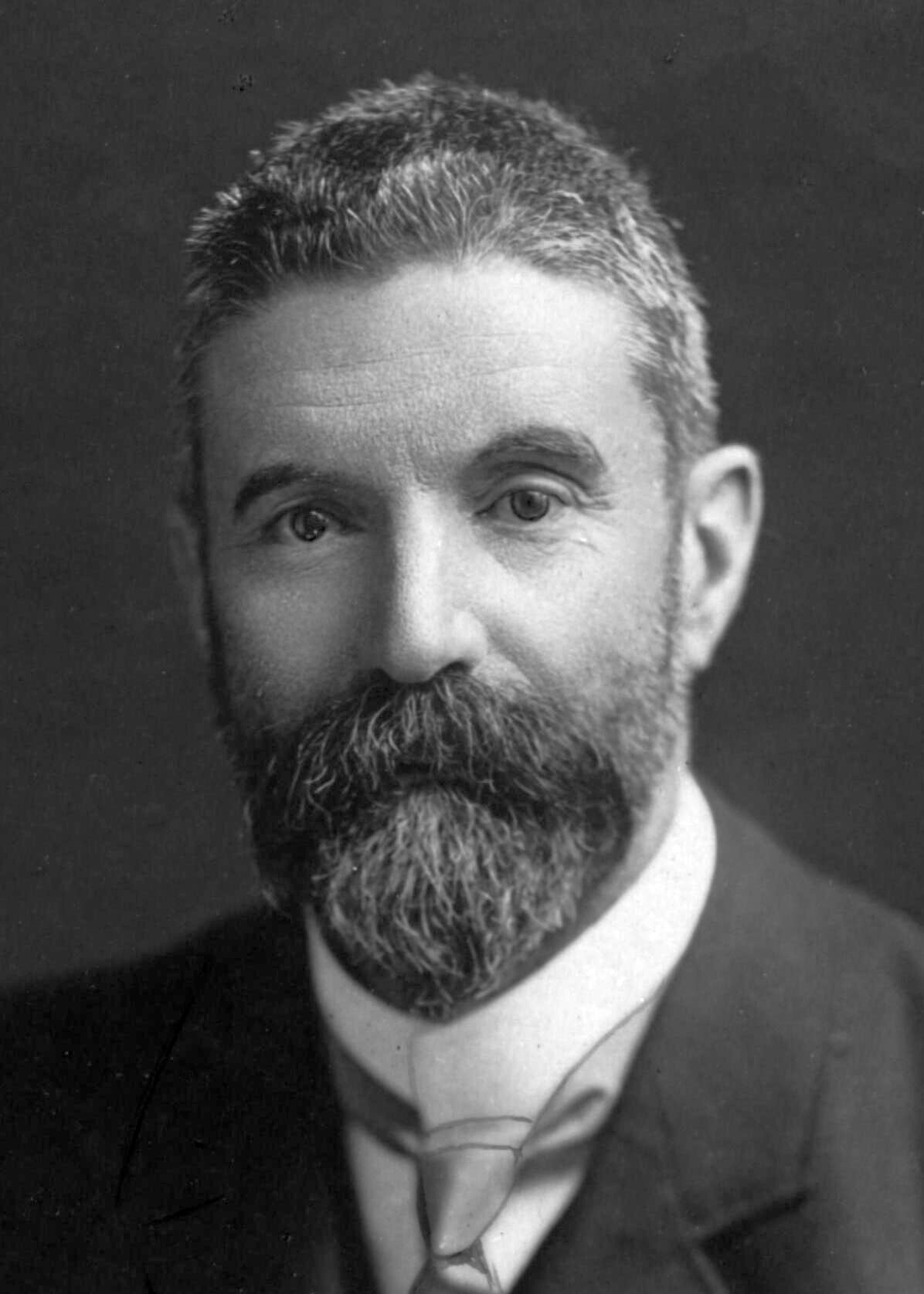
Prime Minister Alfred Deakin, the primary architect of the New Protection

Trade policy was a major topic of political debate in the years surrounding the federation of the British colonies in Australia in 1901. Prime Minister Alfred Deakin's Liberal Protectionist Party was the primary driver for protectionist policies, with support from the Australian Labor Party (ALP).

== Principles and aims ==
The "guiding principle" of New Protection was to establish a link between tariff protection for manufacturing industries and wages for workers in those industries. Its supporters believed that manufacturers who benefited from tariffs had "an obligation to pay fair wages and to provide reasonable working conditions".

In 1907, Deakin submitted an explanatory memorandum to parliament outlining the principles of the New Protection, which Lloyd (2017) has described as the "official beginning" of the policy. In the memorandum, Deakin contrasted the New Protection with the existing protectionist policies:

The 'old' Protection contented itself with making good wages possible. The 'new' Protection seeks to make them actual. It aims at according to the manufacturer that degree of exemption from unfair outside competition that will enable him to pay fair and reasonable wages without impairing the maintenance and extension of his industry, or its capacity to supply the local market

Alfred Deakin articulated the principles of New Protection as early as 1895, when he was a member of the Parliament of Victoria. He stated that the Protectionist Association of Victoria had recently resolved that "industries which enjoy the benefits of fiscal legislation [...] can reasonably be required to submit themselves to such conditions as to minimum hours, rates of wages and monopolies as this House may think fit to adopt". The policy's name has been attributed to Samuel Mauger, a business owner who would later serve as a federal government minister under Deakin, who was said to have coined the term "New Protection" in 1899 and subsequently popularised it among other protectionists. The concept was also promoted by David Syme, the proprietor of The Age newspaper and a mentor of Deakin.

Deakin's biographer Judith Brett summarised the New Protection as the stance that "producers who received the benefits of protection must share them with their white workers in the form of higher wages".

== Enactment and implementation ==
The principles of New Protection were incorporated into various acts governing support for Australian industries, including import tariffs, excise duties, and production bounties. According to Plowman (1992), "New Protection dominated much of the legislative work of the newly formed Commonwealth Parliament to 1912" and was a "major plank of that Parliament's social engineering platform".

Deakin's biographer Judith Brett has cited the Sugar Bounty Act 1905 as the first legislative embodiment of the New Protection. The act gave Queensland sugar-growers a rebate on the sugar excise if they employed only white workers and paid the wages "standard in the district".

=== Harvester case and aftermath ===
Under the Harvester Act, excise duties were made payable by domestic manufacturers of agricultural machinery at a rate equal to half of the tariff payable on the same equipment. The excise duties could be waived on application to the Commonwealth Court of Conciliation and Arbitration if the manufacturer could prove that it had paid "fair and reasonable wages" to its workers. The act did not provide a definition of "fair and reasonable" which was therefore left to the court to define.

In 1907, H. B. Higgins, the president of the Commonwealth Court of Arbitration and Conciliation, chose an application from H. V. McKay's Sunshine Harvester Works as a test case. In Ex parte H.V. McKay, generally known as the Harvester case, Higgins defined a "fair and reasonable" wage as a living wage.

In 1908, the Central Council of Employers of Australia financed an appeal against Higgins' ruling. In R v Barger, the High Court of Australia held that the Excise Tariff (Agricultural Machinery) Act 1906 was an unconstitutional use of the parliament's taxation power, as there was no constitutional basis for regulation of wages.

By 1908, the focus shifted away from legislation as the primary way to implement the New Protection . After the High Court ruling, at an interstate conference in July 1908 the ALP added a plank to its platform calling on the constitution to be amended to guarantee the New Protection. They eventually brought this to a referendum in 1911, but it was unsuccessful and was opposed by Deakin.

Higgins continued to apply his concept of the living wage in other cases that came before the Commonwealth Court of Arbitration and Conciliation, using his powers under the Conciliation and Arbitration Act 1904 to establish industrial awards. While the direct link between tariff policies and wage policies was broken, Higgins' rulings "initiated the unique Australian wage-setting system of a central Australia-wide basic wage determined by the cost of living with margins for skill, all determined by a court".

== Sources ==
- Brett, Judith (2017). The Enigmatic Mr Deakin. Text Publishing. ISBN 9781925498660.
- Hearn, Mark (2018). "'Industrial Defence Against the Whole World': Deakinite New Protection as Narrative of Global Modernity". Journal of Australian Studies. 42 (3): 343–356. doi:10.1080/14443058.2018.1485723. S2CID 150131017.
- Lloyd, Peter (2017). "The Evolution of Tariff Protection and Wage Protection in the Late Colonies and Early Federation". Economic Papers: A Journal of Applied Economics and Policy. 36 (4): 459–476. doi:10.1111/1759-3441.12183.
- Plowman, David H. (1992). "Industrial Relations and the Legacy of New Protection". Journal of Industrial Relations. 34 (1). Industrial Relations Society of Australia: 48–64. doi:10.1177/002218569203400103. S2CID 154587343.
