= Noel Butlin =

Australian economic historian (1921–1991)

Noel G. Butlin AC FAA (19 December 1921 – 2 April 1991) was an Australian economic historian, considered "one of the most outstanding Australian social scientists of his generation, and one of the major international figures in economic history." He was long associated with the Australian National University, the library of which has an archives centre that bears his name.

Butlin was born in Singleton, New South Wales on 19 December 1921. His father was a railway porter. His brother was Sydney James Butlin. Noel Butlin attended Maitland Boys’ High School and the University of Sydney. He worked for Frank Lidgett McDougall, helping to prepare the Australian delegation for the United Nations Food and Agriculture Organisation conference in 1945.

From 1946 to 1949, Butlin was lecturer in economic history at the University of Sydney. In 1962, he became professor of economic history at the Australian National University. He was professor of Australian Studies at Harvard University from 1979 to 1980.

He became a Fellow of the Australian Academy of Social Sciences from 1956 and a corresponding fellow of the British Academy from 1976. The Economic History Society of Australia and New Zealand hold an annual lecture in his name.

Butlin was appointed Companion of the Order of Australia in 1992.

His posthumous 1993 book Economics and the Dreamtime: A Hypothetical History provides an economic history of Australia that covers pre-European Australia's economy, as well as indigenous society's contributions to early colonial Australia's history.

He married Lilias Joan Lindsay, a social worker, in 1946.
