= Asia-Pacific Economic History Review =

Australian Economic History Review
- Discipline: History, economics
- Language: English
- Edited by: Kris Inwood

Publication details
- History: 1961–present
- Publisher: Wiley-Blackwell on behalf of the Economic History Society of Australia and New Zealand
- Frequency: Triannually
- Impact factor: 0.5 (2025)

Standard abbreviations
- ISO 4: Aust. Econ. Hist. Rev.

Indexing
- ISSN: 0004-8992 (print); 1467-8446 (web)
- OCLC no.: 02257994

Links
- Journal homepage; Online access; Online archive

The Asia-Pacific Economic History Review is a peer-reviewed academic journal with social-scientific analyses, principally of Pacific-Asian economic history. From its founding in 1961 until 2023, it had the name Australian Economic History Review.

The journal is published three times a year by Wiley-Blackwell on behalf of the Economic History Society of Australia and New Zealand. Its editor-in-chief is Kris Inwood.

== Indexing and abstracting ==
Until 2023 the journal was published as the Australian Economic History Review

The journal is indexed and abstracted in ProQuest, CSA Environmental Sciences & Pollution Management Database, Historical Abstracts, International Bibliography of the Social Sciences, Journal of Economic Literature/EconLit, Public Affairs Information Service, RePEc, Scopus, Social Sciences Citation Index, and Worldwide Political Sciences Abstracts. According to the Journal Citation Reports, the journal has a 2025 impact factor of 0.5, ranking it 31 out of 45 journals in the category "History of Social Sciences" and 527 out of 626 in the category "Economics".
