= Triumph and Demise: The Broken Promise of a Labor Generation =

2014 book by Paul Kelly

Triumph and Demise
- First edition
- Author: Paul Kelly
- Subject: The Rudd-Gillard Labor governments in Australia
- Publisher: Melbourne University Publishing
- Publication date: 22 October 2014
- Media type: Hard cover
- Pages: 592
- ISBN: 9780522862102
- Preceded by: The March of Patriots: The Struggle for Modern Australia
- Followed by: The Twilight of Exceptionalism: The Liberal and Conservative Era

Triumph and Demise: The Broken Promise of a Labor Generation is a 2014 book which chronicles the rise and fall of the Labor governments of Kevin Rudd and Julia Gillard by the Australian author and journalist Paul Kelly.

== The author ==
Kelly is an Australian political journalist and historian and a commentator on radio and television. He is the editor-at-large of The Australian newspaper, where he writes on Australian politics, public policy and international affairs. Kelly appears as a commentator on Sky News and is the author of seven books: The Unmaking of Gough (1976), The Hawke Ascendancy (1984), The End of Certainty (1992), November 1975 (1995), Paradise Divided (2000), 100 Years: The Australian Story (2001) and The March of Patriots (2009).

== The book ==
Triumph and Demise was launched by prime minister Tony Abbott in Canberra in 2014. It chronicles the six years of the Rudd-Gillard Labor governments, including the Liberal opposition of the period. Kelly conducted interviews with more than 60 of the key players of the Rudd-Gillard era, and explores the tensions at the heart of the strained relationships between the central personalities at the heart of the Labor governments.

=== Reception ===
ABC TV's Tony Jones described the book as looking at the achievements and the failures of the Rudd and Gillard governments and of "a malaise that's making it near impossible for governments to do their jobs properly and implement effective reform" in Australia. Kelly told Jones that the story of Rudd and Gillard was unprecedented: "We've never seen this before. We have never seen an event like this before. Kevin Rudd was a hero in 2007. He campaigned brilliantly against John Howard. He won a great triumph for the Labor Party. It was assumed, it was assumed generally that Labor would have three terms in office - that seemed to be an expectation, a quite proper expectation - and then two and a half years later, Rudd was destroyed by his own party. [...] I argue in the book that this was the fatal move by Labor, that essentially what happened here was that Kevin Rudd's prime ministership was certainly destroyed, but Julia Gillard, the other candidate, the deputy, the successor to Kevin Rudd, was also crippled by the way she became Prime Minister. So essentially what happened that night was you had two events. There were two figures in this partnership, Rudd and Gillard; the partnership fell apart, but both those figures were fatally undermined on that night."

Writing for The Sydney Morning Herald, Tom Switzer said "The book is a sheer delight for the political connoisseur."

Writing for the Sydney Review of Books, Matthew Ricketson was critical of the book and stated "Kelly prides himself on the dispassionate nature of his analysis, calling out Liberal and Labor governments alike, but he straitjackets complex issues in either / or dichotomies."

== See also ==
- Rudd government (2007–2010)
- Gillard government
- Rudd government (2013)
- Abbott government
