= Economic History Society of Australia and New Zealand =

The Economic History Society of Australia and New Zealand is a learned society. Since its foundation in 1974, it has published the Australian Economic History Review which was relaunched in 2023 as the Asia-Pacific Economic History Review. It also holds annual conferences and awards prizes for contributions to the field. An annual lecture in honour of Noel Butlin has been held since 2004, replacing the biennial lecture in honour of Alfred Charles Davidson that ended in the 1990s.
