= Industrial arbitration =

Industrial arbitration is a type of arbitration to prevent or settle labor disputes that may arise between an industrial employer and a union, union member, or union representative to prevent legal action taking place and finding less costly ways to settle disputes.

Taking an issue to court or a breakdown of negotiations can be dangerous for both management and labor, and as such parties are often willing to negotiate and plead their cases with a third party arbiter to come to fair decisions. Industrial arbitration refers to this process taking place in which labor and management will sit down and solve a dispute.

This process often benefits the employer because it reduces the chances of a strike or legal action, and benefits the employee because it allows them more bargaining power and prevents mass layoffs in a dispute. However, at times the government has been known to step in regardless of arbitration clauses and force its own remedies.

== See also ==
- Compulsory arbitration
