= Boris Schedvin =

Australian economic historian

- Born: Carl Boris Schedvin; 23 May 1936; Burwood, New South Wales
- Died: 15 July 2024 (aged 88)

Academic background
- Education: University of Sydney
- Thesis: Economic policy in depression and recovery in Australia, 1927–1935 (1963)

Academic work
- Institutions: University of Melbourne
- Main interests: Economic history of Australia
- Notable works: Australia and the Great Depression; War Economy 1942–1945

Carl Boris Schedvin (23 May 1936 – 15 July 2024) was an Australian economic historian. He is best known for his book on Australia and the Great Depression. He was the co-author War Economy 1942-1945, a volume in the official history series Australia in the War of 1939–1945 and wrote histories of the Council for Scientific and Industrial Research and the Reserve Bank of Australia.

== Biography ==
Carl Boris Schedvin was born in Englewood Private Hospital in the Sydney suburb of Burwood on 23 May 1936, the son of Ruben Herbert Gordon and his wife Caroline Frances née Nilsson. His father died on 1 July 1950. He was educated at Cranbrook School, which he attend on scholarships from 1943 to 1954. He was captain of the school rugby football team and head boy. After graduation, he took a gap year in 1955 and worked as a jackaroo in Cobar.

Schedvin then entered the University of Sydney. He earned his PhD in 1963, writing his thesis on "Economic policy in depression and recovery in Australia, 1927–1935". It was here that he met Bernadette Marshall, the daughter of Professor Charles Marshall. They were married in 1964 at St John's College Chapel at the University of Sydney. They had two children, Sven and Natasha, and remained married until her death in 2023.

Schedvin expanded his thesis into book, Australia and the Great Depression (1970). He co-wrote with Sydney James Butlin War Economy 1942-1945, a volume in the official history series Australia in the War of 1939–1945. He went on to write a history of the Council for Scientific and Industrial Research Shaping Science and Industry (1987); the Reserve Bank of Australia, In Reserve: Central Banking in Australia, 1945–1975 (1992); and the Austrade, Emissaries of Trade (2008). With R. T. Appleguard, he edited a volume of biographies, Australian Financiers: Biographical Essays (1988). He was elected a fellow of the Australian Academy of Social Sciences in 1987.

In 1979, Schedvin was appointed to the chair of economic history at the University of Melbourne and became head of the Department of Economic History there. He established a centre for business research and created a corporate history program. He was elected deputy vice-president of the academic board in 1989 and was appointed deputy vice-chancellor (academic) in 1991, a position he held until his retirement in 2000. In this role he oversaw a series of mergers with the Melbourne College of Advanced Education, the Hawthorn Institute of Education and the Institute of Early Childhood Development. He was involved in the expansion of the University of Melbourne’s international student and international engagement programs. He oversaw the creation of Asialink, the University's Institute of Asian Languages and Societies and the Bio21 Institute. He was awarded an honorary Doctor of Commerce degree in 2001.

Schedvin died on 15 July 2024.

== Bibliography ==
- Australia and the Great Depression (1970)
- War Economy 1942–1945 (1977) (with Sydney James Butlin)
- Shaping Science and Industry: A History of Australia's Council for Scientific and Industrial Research 1926–1949 (1987)
- Australian Financiers: Biographical Essays (1988) (with R. T. Appleguard)
- In Reserve: Central Banking in Australia, 1945–1975 (1992)
- Emissaries of Trade (2008)
