= Harvester case =

Australian labour law decision

Harvester Judgment
- Court: Commonwealth Court of Conciliation and Arbitration
- Full case name: Ex Parte H.V. McKay
- Decided: 8 November 1907
- Citation: (1907) 2 CAR 1
- Transcripts: Mon 7 October 1907; Tue 8 October 1907; Wed 9 October 1907; Thu 10 October 1907; Fri 11 October 1907; Mon 14 October 1907; Tue 15 October 1907; Wed 16 October 1907; Thu 17 October 1907; Fri 18 October 1907; Mon 21 October 1907; Tue 22 October 1907; Wed 23 October 1907; Thu 24 October 1907; Fri 25 October 1907; Mon 28 October 1907; Tue 29 October 1907; Wed 30 October 1907; Thu 31 October 1907; Fri 1 November 1907

Case history
- Subsequent actions: R v Barger [1908] HCA 43, (1908) 6 CLR 41

Court membership
- Judge sitting: Higgins J

Ex parte H.V. McKay, commonly referred to as the Harvester case or the Harvester judgement, is a 1907 decision of the Commonwealth Court of Conciliation and Arbitration considered a landmark in Australian labour law.

The case arose under the Excise Tariff Act 1906, an element of the Deakin government's New Protection policy. The act imposed an excise duty on goods manufactured in Australia (£6 in the case of a stripper harvester), but if a manufacturer paid "fair and reasonable" wages to its employees, it was excused from paying the excise duty. The Court therefore had to consider what was a "fair and reasonable" wage for the purpose of the act.

H.B. Higgins declared that "fair and reasonable" wages for an unskilled male worker required a living wage that was sufficient for "a human being in a civilised community" to support a wife and three children in "frugal comfort", while a skilled worker should receive an additional margin for their skills, regardless of the employer's capacity to pay.

While the High Court of Australia in 1908 held that the Excise Tariff Act 1906 was invalid in R v Barger, the judgment nevertheless continued to be the basis for the minimum wage system that extended to half of the Australian workforce in less than 20 years. The decision was credited as the foundation for the national minimum wage included in the Fair Work Act 2009. As well as national ramifications, the decision was of international significance.

== Background ==
In 1906 the second Deakin government was in power, with support from the Labor party. Prime Minister Deakin's "New Protection" policy was to provide tariff protection to employers in exchange for "fair and reasonable" wages for employees. In implementing this policy, the Commonwealth government introduced two bills, that would become the Customs Tariff Act 1906, and the Excise Tariff Act 1906, Higgins was a member of the Australian Parliament and spoke in support of the bills that imposed custom and excise duties that were payable on certain agricultural machinery, including stripper harvesters. The Excise Tariff Act 1906 contained a proviso that the excise would not be payable if the manufacturer paid "fair and reasonable" wages as follows:

Provided that this Act shall not apply to goods manufactured by any person in any part of the Commonwealth under conditions as to remuneration of labour which—

1. are declared by resolution of both Houses of Parliament to be fair and reasonable; or
2. are in accordance with an industrial award under the Commonwealth Conciliation and Arbitration Act 1904,; or
3. are in accordance with the terms of an industrial agreement filed under the Commonwealth Conciliation and Arbitration Act 1904; or
4. are, on an application made for the purpose to the President of the Commonwealth Court of Conciliation and Arbitration, declared to be fair and reasonable by him or by a Judge of the Supreme Court of a State or any person or persons who compose a State Industrial Authority to whom he may refer the matter.

=== H. B. Higgins ===
H. B. Higgins had been a member of the Parliament of Victoria and in 1896 supported the trial introduction of a minimum wage. He successfully argued at the 1897-1898 conventions that the constitution should contain a guarantee of religious freedom, and also a provision giving the federal government the power to make laws relating to the conciliation and arbitration of industrial disputes. The industrial disputes proposal was initially unsuccessful, however Higgins was undeterred and succeeded in 1898. Despite these successes, Higgins J had opposed the draft constitution produced by the convention as too conservative, and campaigned unsuccessfully to have it defeated at the 1899 Australian constitutional referendum.

After the federation of Australia, Higgins was a member of the Australian Parliament as a member of the Protectionist Party, but was in broad agreement with the Labor party's social reforms. When the Labor Party sought to amend the Conciliation and Arbitration Bill to cover state railway employees, Higgins was one of the radicals who supported the amendments and helped bring down Deakin's government. When Labor formed a minority government in 1904, Higgins became Attorney-General in the Labor ministry, because Labor had no suitably qualified lawyer in Parliament.

In October 1906 Higgins was appointed to the High Court and the following year O'Connor J resigned as President of the Commonwealth Court of Conciliation and Arbitration and was replaced by Higgins J.

=== Hugh Victor McKay ===
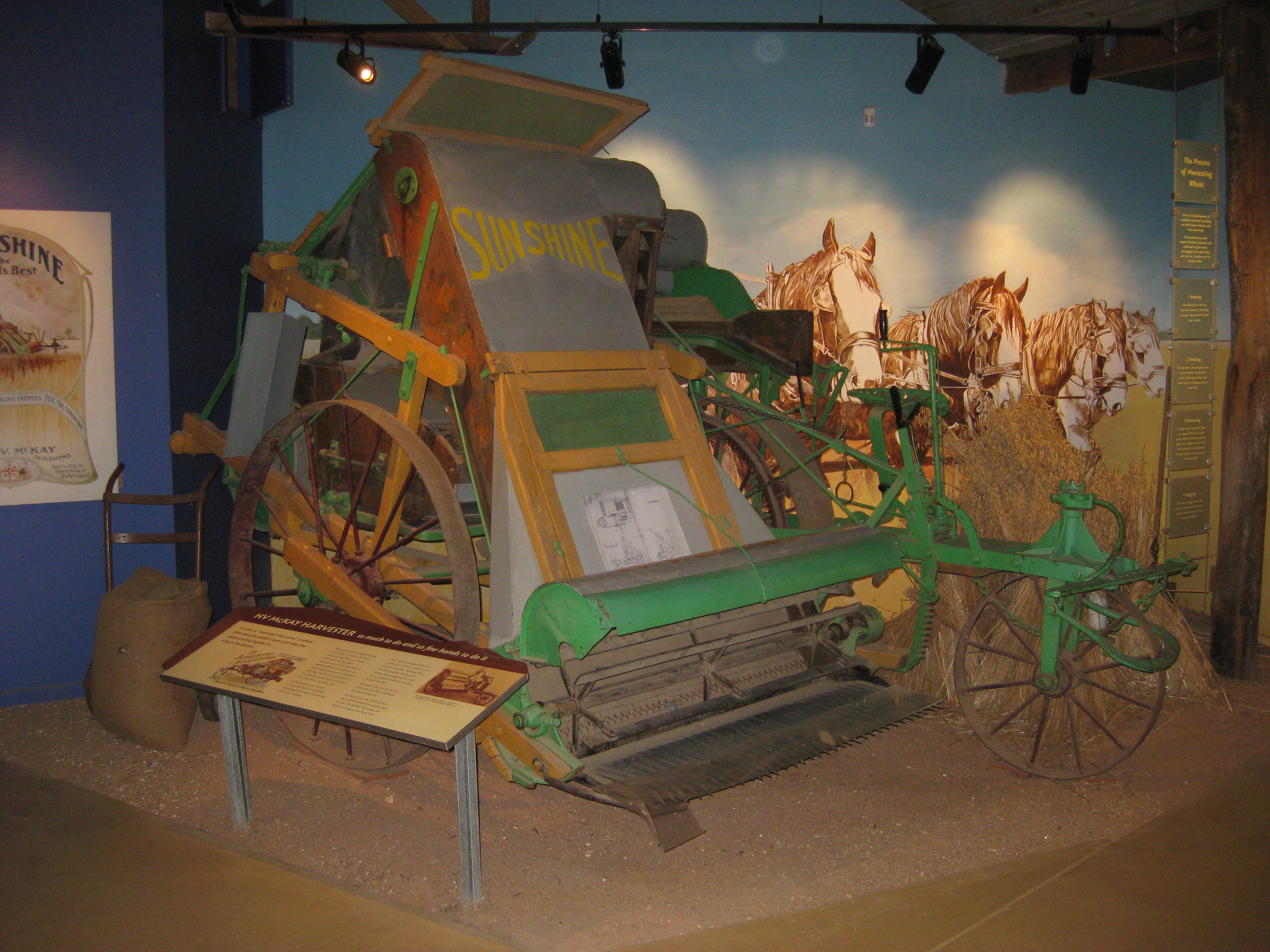
Sunshine Harvester on display at the Campaspe Run Rural Discovery Centre, Elmore, Victoria, Australia.

Hugh Victor McKay was one of Australia's largest employers, manufacturing agricultural machinery, most notably the Sunshine Harvester. McKay had a reputation for discouraging union membership, and had previously closed his factory at Ballarat and moved to the Sunshine Harvester Works to avoid paying workers under the determination of a wages board. Under the Excise Tariff Act 1906, he was required to pay an excise tax unless he paid wages that were fair and reasonable. McKay applied to the Commonwealth Court of Conciliation and Arbitration for a declaration that the wages paid by him were fair and reasonable.

== The hearing in the Court of Conciliation and Arbitration ==
McKay's was one of 112 applications by manufacturers of agricultural machinery in Victoria and his application was selected as a test case because the factory was one of the largest, and had the greatest number and variety of employees and because his application was strongly opposed by various unions. Other applicants were told that the Court, in dealing with their application, would be limited to the information obtained in McKay's hearing unless there was some exceptional circumstances. Several large manufacturers were represented in the hearing, but did not call any evidence. The hearing took place in Melbourne over 20 days between 7 October 1907 to 1 November 1907.

=== The evidence and arguments ===
McKay's case was that fair and reasonable wages should be calculated according to the worth of each individual to the business and led evidence from eight witnesses, including from the factory superintendent, McKay's brother George. George McKay's evidence was that the workers received fair and reasonable wages that took into account their level of skill, experience, age, qualifications, complexity of work, equipment used, and level of danger. The employees at the Sunshine Harvester factory required less skill, judgement and discretion because of mechanisation which had simplified and standardised the work.

The unions, represented by Duffy KC and Arthur, led evidence from employees of McKay's factory and also their wives, union officials and others dealing with everything from the conditions at the factory and elsewhere to the cost of living, including the "reasonable enjoyments that a man enjoys in that state of life". Higgins J gave his judgment on 8 November 1907.

=== The decision ===
Higgins J held that for McKay to pay a fair and reasonable wage meant paying his employees a wages that met "the normal needs of an average employee, regarded as a human being in a civilised community", regardless of his capacity to pay. This gave rise to the legal requirement for a basic wage. In defining a 'fair and reasonable wage', Higgins (without explicit acknowledgement) employed Pope Leo XIII's Rerum novarum of 1891, an open letter to all the bishops that addressed the condition of the working classes. Higgins ruled that remuneration "must be enough to support the wage earner in reasonable and frugal comfort." A 'fair and reasonable' minimum wage for unskilled workers of 7/- (7 shillings), which is around 70 cents, or 42/- per week. Later surveys showed that this minimum was adequate to provide subsistence.

Higgins's judgment read as follows:

One finds that the Legislation has not indicated what is meant by 'fair and reasonable,' what is the model or criterion by which fairness and reasonableness are to be determined. It is to be regretted that the Legislature has not given a definition of the words. It is the function of the Legislature, not of the Judiciary, to deal with social and economic problems; it is for the Judiciary to apply, and, when necessary, interpret the enactments of the Legislature. But here this whole controversial problem, with its grave social and economic bearings, has been committed to a judge, who is not, at least directly, responsible, and who ought not to be responsible to public opinion. even if the delegation of duties should be successful in this case, it by no means follows that it will be so hereafter. I do not protest against the difficulty of the problem, but against the confusion of functions and against the failure to define, the shunting of legislative responsibility. It would be almost as reasonable to tell a Court to do what is 'right' with regard to real estate, and yet lay down no laws or principles for its guidance. In the course of the long discussion of this case, I have been convinced that the President of this Court is put in a false position. The strength of the Judiciary in the public confidence is largely because the judge has not to devise great principles of action as between great classes, or to lay down what is fair and reasonable between contending interests in the community; but has to carry out mandates of the Legislature evolved out of the conflict of public opinion after debate in Parliament. I venture to think that it will not be found wise to bring the judicial department within the range of political fire....

The provision for 'fair and reasonable' remuneration is obviously designed for the benefit of the employees in the industry; and it must be meant to secure to them something which they cannot get by the ordinary system of individual bargaining with employers....

The remuneration could safely have been left to the usual, but unequal, contest, the "higgling of the market" for labour, with the pressure for bread on the one side, and the pressure for profits on the other. The standard of 'fair and reasonable' must therefore be something else, and I cannot think of any other standard appropriate than the normal needs of an average employee, regarded as a human being in a civilised community. If, instead of individual bargaining, one can conceive of a collective agreement – an agreement between all the employers in a given trade on the one side, and all the employees on the other – it seems to me that the framers of the agreement would have to take as the first and dominant factor the cost of living as a civilised being. If A lets B have the use of his horses on the terms that he gives them fair and reasonable treatment, I have no doubt that it is B's duty to give them proper food and water, and such shelter and rest as they need; and, as wages are the means of obtaining commodities, surely the State in stipulating for fair and reasonable remuneration for the employees means that the wages shall be sufficient to provide these things, and clothing and a condition of frugal comfort estimated by current human standards.

Higgins also said the following.

I regard the applicant's undertaking as a marvel of enterprise, energy and pluck… he is allowed – if my view of the Act is correct – to make any profits that he can and they are not subject to investigation. But when he chooses, in the course of his economies, to economise at the expense of human life, when his economy involves the withholding from his employees of reasonable remuneration, or reasonable conditions of human existence, then, as I understand the Act, Parliament insists on the payment of the Excise duty.

Higgins J thought the probable effect of the decision would be that McKay must elect between paying wages according to the standard he set or paying the excise duties. McKay did neither and both McKay and another manufacturer of agricultural machinery in Melbourne, William Barger, were prosecuted by the Commonwealth for failing to pay the excise. The defences of Barger and McKay included an objection that the Excise Act 1906 was invalid. That objection was referred to the Full Court of the High Court for hearing. While this is sometimes referred to as an appeal, this was not a direct challenge to the Harvester judgement and Higgins sat as one of the five judges in the High Court.

== Excise Act 1906 struck down by the High Court ==
The High Court found in R v Barger (1908) that the Excise Act 1906, which gave rise to Higgins's decision, was constitutionally invalid because the legislation was essentially concerned with the regulation of employment conditions, a power not held by the Commonwealth Parliament and not capable of being supported by the excise power. The High Court further found a tax based on compliance with certain labour conditions which could differ from State to State was a discrimination within the meaning of section 51(ii) and a preference within the meaning of section 99.

== Significance ==
The judgment dominated Australian economic life for the next 60 to 80 years. Higgins's 1907 Harvester decision was regarded as a benchmark in Australian labour law. Despite the High Court's reversal in R v Barger, Higgins regarded the minimum wage as sacrosanct and applied the Harvester reasoning to subsequent judgments in his career as president of the Conciliation and Arbitration Court.

Former Prime Minister Bob Hawke described the Harvester judgment as foundationally important, stating "The philosophy was so right and so in tune with the Australian ethos that it spread. And not just through federal jurisdiction - it became embraced by various state jurisdictions. I think it is impossible to overstate the significance of both the judgement and its author, Henry Bournes Higgins." Conservative commentator Gerard Henderson was critical of the decision, describing it as a deeply flawed decision representing a failed policy that was strong on sentiment that failed to consider the ability of employers to pay nor acknowledged geographical differences in the cost of living.

=== Contemporaneous reaction ===
Then, as now, the reaction to the Harvester decision was mixed. The Worker described it as a triumph of Equity and that it marked the beginning of an epoch, with the inclusion of the last phase of human life left outside the scope of law.

=== McKay's criticism ===
In response to the High Court decision, McKay stated "The Excise Act was declared to be ultra vires - The Federal Parliament had gone beyond its powers, all the ingenuity and eloquence spent on the measure, all the litigation devoted to its practical enforcement, and all the elaborate conditions laid down by the Arbitration Court and by the Customs authorities, crumbled to nothing."

In 1922, McKay wrote to Prime Minister Hughes on the subject of wages boards and collective bargaining, stating "I do not agree with the basic wage for the Commonwealth. In other parts of the world it is a minimum wage for the minimum man and a maximum wage for the maximum man - each man according to his ability and capacity. God did not make men equal - it is no use trying to pretend He did, or to make laws as though He did, or to pay people according to their requirements instead of according to their services."

=== No equal pay for women ===
The Court determined that a fair and reasonable wage was to be determined according to the needs of a male worker not according to the worker's value to the employer. What then was a fair and reasonable wage for a female worker? Higgins J considered this in 1912 in the Fruit pickers case, rejecting an application for equal pay for women, deciding that this would represent equal pay for unequal work. His Honour held that women should only be awarded the full male rate where there was the risk of cheap female labour displacing men, setting a common rate for fruit pickers of 1 shilling per hour. The work of packing at the factory was "essentially adapted for women with their superior deftness and the suppleness of fingers" and this apparently justified a lower minimum wage of 9 pence per hour, which would provide for the woman's food, shelter and clothing but not that of her family. Until World War II, the female basic wage was, generally speaking, approximately 54 per cent of the male basic wage. The assumptions of a male bread winner and female domestic carer have been criticised as a deliberate policy of discouraging women in the paid workforce, reflecting a flawed understanding of work and care where the normative worker of the labour market is without responsibilities to care for others. It thus ensured the continuance of the women's inferior place in the paid work force, only entitled to equal wages if their work threatened the position of men.

== See also ==
- White Paper on Full Employment in Australia
