= Paul Kelly (journalist) =

Australian political journalist and historian

- Born: Paul John Kelly; 11 October 1947 (age 79); Sydney, New South Wales, Australia
- Education: University of Sydney
- Occupations: Journalist, historian, radio commentator
- Years active: 1971–present
- Spouses: Ros Kelly; Margaret (née Leckie)
- Children: Joseph, Daniel

Paul John Kelly (born 11 October 1947) is an Australian political journalist, author and television and radio commentator from Sydney. He has worked in a variety of roles, principally for The Australian newspaper and is currently its editor-at-large. Kelly also appears as a commentator on Sky News Australia and has written seven books on political events in Australia since the 1970s including on the 1975 Australian constitutional crisis. Recent works include The March of Patriots, which chronicles the creation of a modern Australia during the 1991–2007 era of prime ministers, Paul Keating and John Howard, and Triumph & Demise which focuses on the leadership tensions at the heart of the Rudd–Gillard Labor governments of 2007 to 2011. Kelly presented the Australian Broadcasting Corporation (ABC) TV documentary series 100 Years – The Australian Story (2001) and wrote a book of the same title.

In 2006, Kelly's work was described by fellow Australian journalists Toby Creswell and Samantha Trenoweth as being "distinguished for his broad and deep grasp of the inter-relationship of economics and political shifts, and his ability to place Australian domestic developments into an international and historical context".

== Life and career ==
Paul John Kelly was born on 11 October 1947 in Sydney, New South Wales. He is the son of Joseph Kelly and Sybil (née Mackenzie). He completed a Bachelor of Arts degree and Diploma of Education at the University of Sydney in 1969. He worked in the Prime Minister's Department in Canberra from 1969 to 1971 before changing to journalism. He is a Doctor of Letters from the University of Melbourne.

He joined the Canberra Press Gallery in 1971 and became chief political correspondent for The Australian from 1974 to 1975. From 1976 to 1978 he was chief political correspondent for The National Times, then its deputy editor from 1978 to 1979. He became chief political correspondent for The Sydney Morning Herald from 1981 to 1984. He returned to The Australian and was its national affairs editor from 1985 to 1991, editor-in-chief from 1991 to 1996 and editor-at-large from 1996 to the present.

Aside from journalism, Kelly has written books describing political developments starting with The Unmaking of Gough (1976) on the Australian constitutional crisis of 1975 and Prime Minister Gough Whitlam (later titled The Dismissal : Australia's Most Sensational Power Struggle : The Dramatic Fall of Gough Whitlam). He has written books on subsequent Prime Ministers, Bob Hawke (The Hawke Ascendency, 1984), Paul Keating (The End of Certainty, 1992) and John Howard (Howard's Decade, 2006). His The March of Patriots: The Struggle for Modern Australia (2009) deals with economic and political developments under Keating and Howard as Australia entered the globalised age. Triumph & Demise: The Broken Promise of a Labor Generation (2014) chronicles the rise and fall of the Australian Labor Party governments of Kevin Rudd and Julia Gillard (2007–2013).

His book The Dismissal was used as the basis of the television miniseries The Dismissal shown on Network Ten from 6 March 1983. Kelly is a political commentator on radio and television (including Insiders) and presented the Australian Broadcasting Corporation (ABC) TV documentary series, 100 Years – The Australian Story (2001) and wrote a book of the same title.

On 19 March 1990, Kelly wrote on The Australian newspaper ran a headline titled Peacock a 'danger in the Lodge'. when Andrew Peacock Liberal opposition leader opposed the Multifunction Polis (MFP), a proposal to build a Japanese funded technology city in Australia.

In November 1991, after the massacres at Santa Cruz (near Dili, East Timor), Kelly had supported Indonesian president Suharto and declared him to be a moderate with no alternative to his rule. Kelly's support for Suharto continued to 1998 and earned criticism from fellow journalist John Pilger who compared it to the appeasement of Hitler in the 1930s.

In November 2012, Kelly criticised the decision of the government led by Julia Gillard to create the Royal Commission into Institutional Responses to Child Sexual Abuse, calling it "profoundly ignorant" and "a depressing example of populist politics".

== Personal life ==
He is married to Margaret née Leckie. They have two sons, Joseph and Daniel. Kelly was previously married to Australian Labor Party federal member of Parliament and minister Ros Kelly née Raw.

Kelly opposed Australia's same-sex marriage legislation, questioning the "real ideology" of the same-sex marriage campaign and its impact on "religious freedom".

== Bibliography ==
=== Books ===
- Kelly, Paul (1976). The unmaking of Gough. Sydney: Angus & Robertson.
- — (1983) [1976]. The Dismissal : Australia's most sensational power struggle : the dramatic fall of Gough Whitlam. Sydney: Angus & Robertson. ISBN 978-0-207-14860-6.
- Kelly, Paul (1984). The Hawke Ascendancy – A Definitive Account of Its Origins and Climax, 1975–1983. Sydney: Angus & Robertson. ISBN 0-207-14727-2.
- Kelly, Paul (1986). The Political Outlook. Melbourne: Syntec Economic Services. ISBN 0-7316-2270-7.
- Kelly, Paul (1992). The End of Certainty: The Story of the 1980s. St Leonards: Allen & Unwin. ISBN 1-86373-227-6.
- Kelly, Paul (1994) [1992]. The End of Certainty: Power, Politics and Business in Australia (Rev. ed.). St Leonards: Allen & Unwin. ISBN 1-86373-757-X.
- Kelly, Paul (1994) [1976]. The Unmaking of Gough (Rev. ed.). St Leonards: Allen & Unwin. ISBN 1-86373-788-X.
- Kelly, Paul (1995). November 1975 : the inside story of Australia's greatest political crisis. St Leonards: Allen & Unwin.
- Kelly, Paul (1996). Ethics, politics and democracy : held in the Banco Court of New South Wales Queen's Square, Sydney, Tuesday 10 December 1996. Sydney: St James Ethics Centre.
- The Australian; Kelly, Paul; The national affairs team (1999). Murray Waldren (ed.). Future Tense : Australia Beyond Election 1998. St Leonards: Allen & Unwin. ISBN 1-86508-034-9.
- Kelly, Paul (2000). Paradise Divided: The Changes, the Challenges, the Choices for Australia. St Leonards: Allen & Unwin. ISBN 1-86508-291-0.
- Kelly, Paul (2001). 100 Years : The Australian Story. Crows Nest: Allen & Unwin. ISBN 1-86508-531-6.
- Peter Dawkins, Paul Kelly, ed. (2003). Hard Heads, Soft Hearts : A New Reform Agenda for Australia. St Leonards: Allen & Unwin. ISBN 1-74114-021-8.
- Kelly, Paul (2006). Howard's Decade : An Australian Foreign Policy Reappraisal. Double Bay: Longueville Media (Lowy Institute). ISBN 978-1-921004-24-7.
- Kelly, Paul (2007). Religion and Politics : Contemporary Tensions. St Leonards: Centre for Independent Studies. ISBN 978-1-86432-120-3.
- Kelly, Paul (2009). The March of Patriots: The Struggle for Modern Australia. Carlton, Vic.: Melbourne University Press. ISBN 978-0-522-85619-4.
- Kelly, Paul (2014). Triumph and Demise: The Broken Promise of a Labor Generation, Carlton, Vic: Melbourne University Press. ISBN 9780522862102
- Kelly, Paul; Troy Bramston (2015). The Dismissal : in the Queen's name. Penguin.
- Kelly, Paul & Troy Bramston (2020). The truth of the Palace Letters : deceit, ambush and dismissal in 1975. Carlton, Vic.: Melbourne University Press.
- Kelly, Paul (2026). The Twilight of Exceptionalism: The Liberal and Conservative Era. Carlton, Vic.: Melbourne University Press. ISBN 978-0-522-86912-5.

=== Essays and reporting ===
- Kelly, Paul (January–February 1996). "The Dismissal, twenty years on". Politics. Quadrant. 40 (1–2): 40–47.

=== Critical studies and reviews of Kelly's work ===
The Dismissal : in the Queen's name

- Flint, David (January–February 2016). "Blame Whitlam and Fraser, not Kerr". Quadrant. 60 (1–2): 76–80..

November 1975

- Manne, Robert (December 1995). "November 1975 : character and crisis". Books. Quadrant. 39 (12): 83–86.

The truth of the Palace Letters

- Piccini, Joe (January–February 2021). "'An endless tussle with the past' : two different readings of the Palace Letters". Australian Book Review. 428: 9–10.

== Awards ==
- 1990 Graham Perkin Australian Journalist of the Year Award
- 2001 Walkley Awards for both Journalism Leadership and Commentary, Analysis, Opinion & Critique
- 2005 Dunlop Asialink Medalist
- 2014 Walkley Book Award for Triumph and Demise

== See also ==
- Australian settlement, term coined by Kelly and widely adopted
