= Stripper (agriculture) =

Harvesting machine

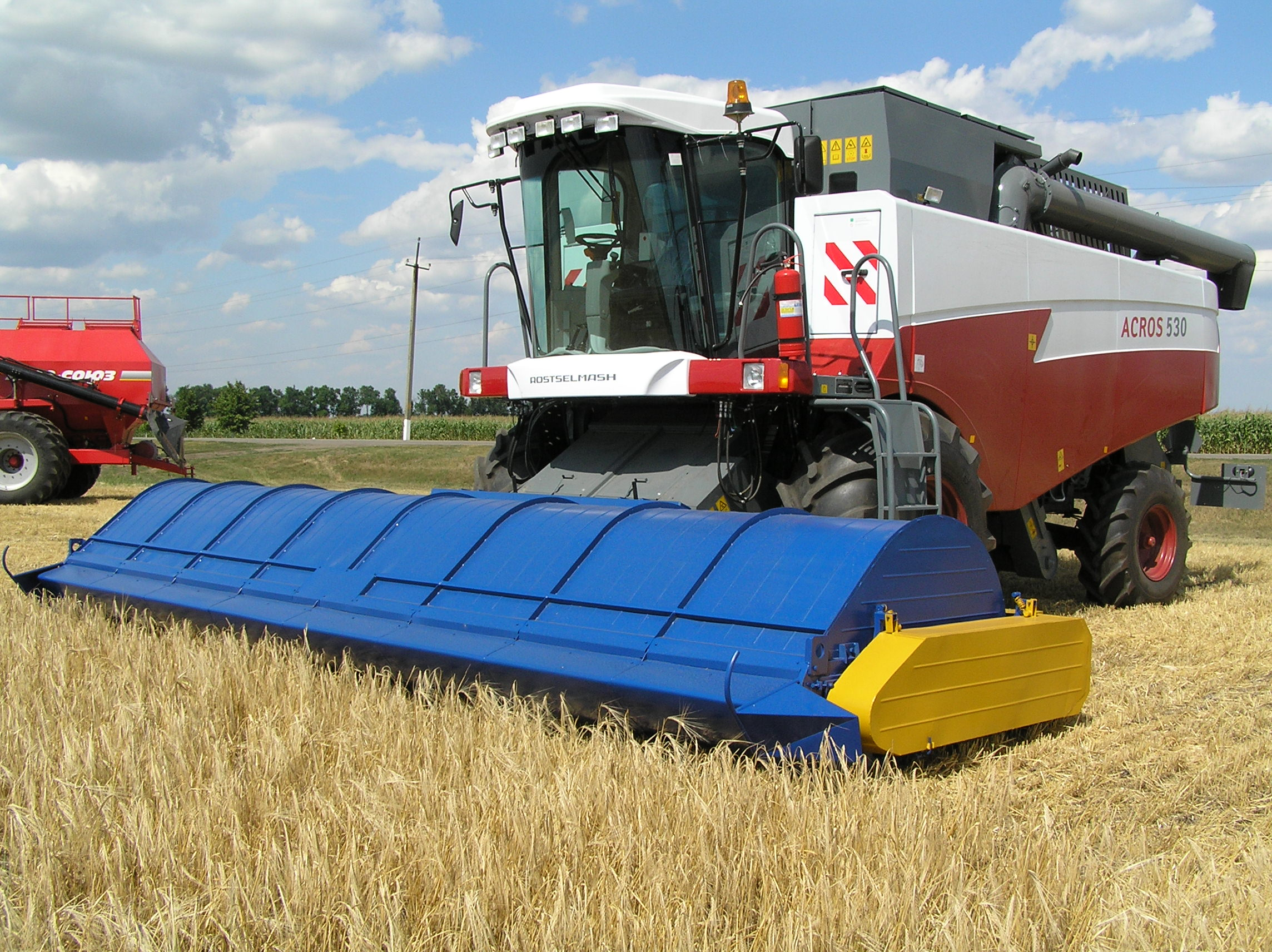
Harvester with a double-drum, stripping harvesting unit

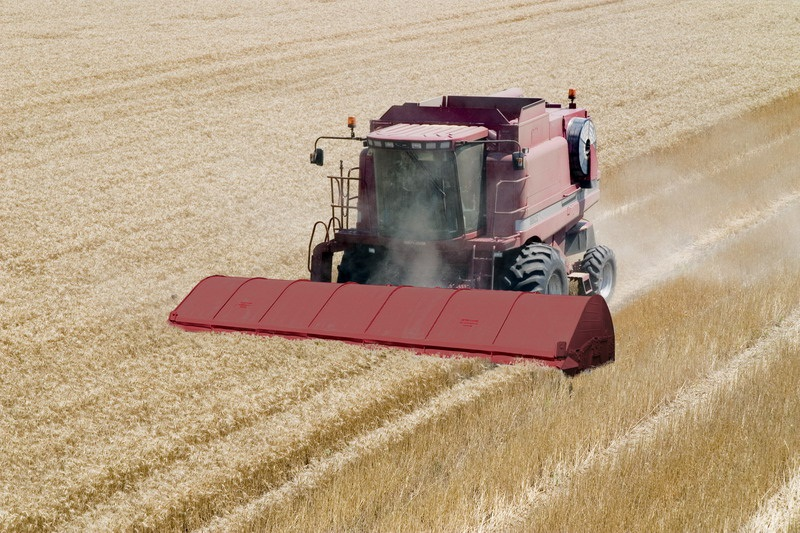
Harvester with a stripping harvesting unit

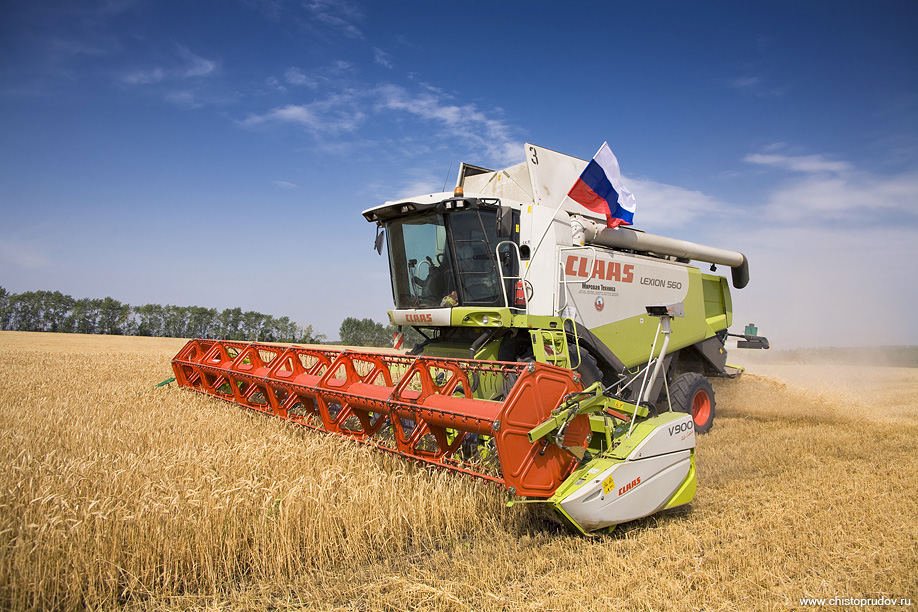
Harvester with a traditional harvesting unit

Stripper is a type of harvesting machine designed for harvesting grain using the method of stripping standing crops. Unlike a conventional combine harvester, this machine collects grain by stripping the spikes only, without cutting the culms at their base. Harvesting grain by stripping was known as early as the 1st century AD but was later abandoned. Today, it is used on a small scale thanks to the implementation of specialized harvesting headers in combine harvesters.

The stripper was common in Australia in the late 19th and early 20th century. John Ridley is now accepted as its inventor, though John Wrathall Bull argued strongly for the credit.

== Description ==
Harvesting is the final stage of crop cultivation. It should be done as quickly as possible after the grain has reached maturity. Leaving the harvest in the field can lead to partial or even total loss of its value due to adverse weather conditions, fires, and wildlife. The speed of harvesting depends on the throughput of the combine's threshing unit. During the threshing process, which is preceded by cutting, a significant amount of straw passes through the combine, limiting the vehicle's speed. A stripper leaves most of the straw in the field, with grain making up 80% of the harvested mass, which is twice as much as with traditional harvesting. This feature allows for a twofold increase in the working speed of the combine, shortening the harvesting time. Stripping also reduces grain losses that occur during the gathering process in the cutting harvesting unit.

In traditional harvesting, a certain amount of energy – and thus fuel used in the combine – is consumed for cutting plant stems, transporting, deforming during threshing, and separating. The stripping technology allows for a 35–40% reduction in fuel consumption. The main advantages of a stripper include:

- the ability to harvest grain with moisture levels over 20%, which is nearly impossible with a traditional combine;
- harvesting with minimal loss of lodged and tangled grain;
- harvesting from fields infested with low weeds;
- compatibility with cultivation technologies where crop residues remain in the field;
- retention of snow on the field due to leftover plant parts in dry areas.

The stripper plucks the ears of grain (generally wheat) without winnowing, and leaving the straw standing. The first strippers were drawn by bullocks and consisted of a large, wheeled, box-like machine with a row of spiked prongs in front and with a long pole at the back of the machine for steering. It had the advantage over the early reaper machines in being able to reap more quickly (of benefit in a hot climate) and having fewer components subject to wearing out.

The first strippers were improved by adding a beater to knock the heads off the stems. The machines became headers. Later headers had reciprocating cutter bars at the back of the combs to cut the stems just short of the heads.

A stripper-harvester also winnowed the grain, removing the chaff.

Notable manufacturers were Sunshine Harvester, J. & D. Shearer and Mellor Bros. (who specialised in "bike strippers", i.e. light enough to be drawn by a bicycle).

== History ==
The historical development of the stripper has an interrupted and multi-stage character. In certain historical periods, it emerged as a means to meet the pressing needs of society, only to fade into obscurity before being revived again after centuries. During this time, a large number of strippers were developed, produced, and tested by inventors, but only a few were implemented in production and applied in agriculture.

=== Gallic reaper ===
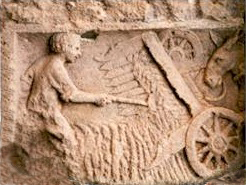
Bas-relief of the Gallic reaper

The first mentions of methods for harvesting only the spikes of grain using a primitive machine can be found in the Natural History of Pliny the Elder, written for the Roman Emperor Titus. The author described primitive machines used in large estates in Gaul as more efficient than manual labor. A more detailed description of these machines appears in the Treatise on Agriculture by the 4th-century writer Palladius. According to Palladius, this device took the form of a two-wheeled cart with a comb mounted at an angle at the front. An ox or donkey was harnessed to the cart. Alongside the cart walked a person with a T-shaped tool (a long stick with a smaller one transversely mounted at the end). As the machine moved across the field, the comb engaged the stalks at the level of the inflorescences, and the person used the tool to "comb" the spikes so that they touched the comb, broke off, and fell into the cart. The stalks remained untouched in the field.

The main task of stripping machines – i.e., separating spikes from stalks – was made possible by the comb and the active T-shaped tool. Such a device could only harvest grain with spikes located at the ends of long stalks. It is unknown how long this machine was used in Gaul, but considering that Pliny the Elder mentions it in the second half of the 1st century and Palladius confirms its existence in the first half of the 4th century, it is likely that the Gallic reaper was used for at least 250 years.

=== Australian harvester ===
John Ridley's harvester

The development of stripper-harvesters began in the mid-19th century during the English colonization of Australia. For colonists, the dry climate of Australia posed a significant problem, as grain would dry out and become brittle before harvest, leading to losses during cutting. This issue was addressed in 1843 by John Ridley, who improved the Gallic reaper and adapted it to Australia's climatic conditions.

Ridley's innovations included a four-wheeled cart that was steered using the rear wheels, with horses harnessed at the back to drive the machine. At the front of the cart, a comb was attached, above which was a paddle drum that rotated due to the movement of the harvester's wheels. The gap between the teeth of the comb was adjusted to the size of the stalks. The harvester was operated by one person. Similar to the Gallic reaper, the comb engaged the stalks at the level of the inflorescences. Instead of a person breaking off the spikes, the front drum used paddles to partially thresh the grain as it rotated and transport it to the basket. Thanks to the improved steering and mechanization of the threshing process, John Ridley's stripper-harvester could clear 4 hectares in a single working day, which was comparable to the labor output of 10 reapers in the same time and space. The Ridley harvester was used solely for harvesting cereal crops. The leader in the production of this type of harvester was Joseph Mellor's company, which produced over 3,000 machines in just a few years.

=== Morrow and McKay's harvester ===
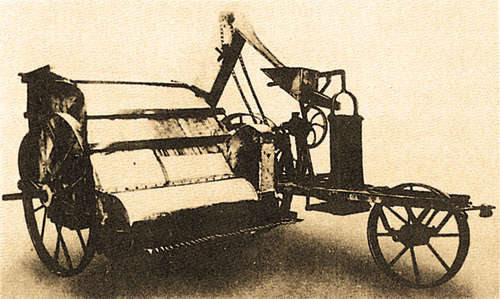
Victor McKay's harvester

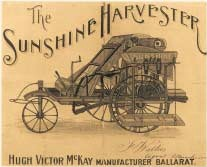
Sunshine Harvester

The next stage in the development of strippers involved adding new functions to the machine: threshing the stripped spikes, cleaning the grain from chaff and straw, filling cleaned grains into bags, and unloading bags of grain while the machine was in motion. These innovations were introduced by James Morrow and H. Victor McKay, who presented their own strippers in 1883 and 1884, respectively. Their harvester was a three-wheeled machine pulled by horses harnessed to the front left side. The harvester was operated by two operators: one steered the machine while the other filled the bags with grain. In a single working day, the harvester could clear 40 hectares. This type of stripper still excels in terms of minimal energy loss per ton of harvested crop.

In 1895, H. Victor McKay founded the Sunshine Harvester company, where he continuously improved his harvester. In 1916, thanks to enhancements by Hadley Shepherd, the company began producing new strippers equipped with a cutting device beneath the comb, allowing the threshed material to be transported by a conveyor. These structural features expanded the harvester's capabilities, enabling the collection of moist and lodged grain. After a change of ownership in 1950, the company ceased the production of strippers under the Sunshine brand, and six years later, they were completely withdrawn from production.

=== Russian strippers ===
In 1868, agronomist Andrei Vlasenko from the Tver Governorate presented an agricultural machine called the Horse Harvester for Collecting Grain on the Stalk, which combined a mower, transportation devices, and a thresher. The machine was pulled by two horses, guided by a single driver. According to Vlasenko, this machine replaced the work of 20 harvesters and was eight times more efficient than the American McCormick harvester. A similar machine was created by M. Gumilin in the Samara Governorate, who utilized Vlasenko's insights. However, none of these machines went into large-scale production. In 1869, Vlasenko patented his invention. Scholars and farmers intervened with the authorities regarding mass production of his machine, but the Minister of Agriculture did not support their request.

=== Contemporary strippers ===
In the second half of the 20th century, work resumed on improving harvesting methods using strippers, which, according to scientist Leonid Pogorelov, should replace traditional combines.

The prototype of modern strippers was likely the machine developed by American K. Baldwin. Unlike older designs, the new stripper featured an active working tool shaped like a cylindrical drum (rotor), along whose edges rows of combs were mounted. As the drum rotated, the combs immersed into the stems and stripped the grain portion of the harvest. Instead of breaking the spikes, as was previously done, they were threshed. The machine was designed for harvesting wet and lodged grain as well as cleaning weedy fields. Production of this type of stripper began in the last decade of the 20th century by the company Shelbourne Reynolds in the United Kingdom.

Independently of the English, a similar solution was developed in the early 1980s by Petro Shabanov, head of the harvesting machinery laboratory at the Agricultural Mechanization Institute in Melitopol (now Tavria State Agrotechnological University), who created two-drum machines.

==== Operation ====
Strippers are divided into single-drum and double-drum types. A double-drum harvester consists of a stripping drum, a front ejector drum, a feeder, and a stationary deflector hood. When the machine is set in motion, the plant stems are deflected by the deflector hood. Due to the suction airflow created by the stripping drum and the ejector drum, the spikes are drawn into the threshing unit. Threshing occurs through the combs with rectangular teeth located on the surface of the drums. The threshed grain is transported to the feeder and then to the inclined chamber of the harvester. Single-drum harvesters are structurally simpler; they contain a stripping drum (rotor), a cutting unit, a stabilizing disc, and a feeder.

Comparative studies of single-drum (Shelbourn) and double-drum (MON-4) harvesters conducted in 1980 in Crimea during rice harvesting, in Kuban during wheat harvesting, and in western Russia during barley harvesting showed that yield losses when using the double-drum machine are 1.5% lower.

== Evolution of the header ==
The Gallic reaper that is seen in Roman times, in the first three centuries of the current era led to the stripper developed in the 19th century. The Gallic reaper had a comb at the front to collect grain heads. An operator would knock the heads into a tray for collection. The stripper developed in South Australia used the principles, with a comb at the front, using a mechanical beater to knock the heads off. Later innovations were including a cutter bar similar to the binder reaper and an elevator to lift the heads into a storage bin for later threshing. The combined header-harvester added the winnower to thresh the grain from the heads.

== Limitations ==
Strippers are designed for the harvesting of grains and certain types of seed plants. The harvesting of legumes using this technology is not feasible due to the arrangement of pods on the stem. They cannot be used for two-step harvesting, which makes them unsuitable for plants that require drying after cutting. With proper operation, grain losses do not exceed 1%, but they can be higher in cases of delayed harvesting, when the grain no longer adheres to the spike and falls off, as well as in fields with a significant height difference in flowering heads. The use of strippers is not recommended on stony fields, nor when harvesting lodged crops.

== Sources ==
The Australian National Dictionary Oxford University Press 1988 ISBN 0 19 554736 5
