= Commonwealth Conciliation and Arbitration Act 1904 =

Act of the Parliament of Australia, no longer in force, registered as C1904A00013

Parliament of Australia
- Long title: An act relating to Conciliation and Arbitration for the Prevention and Settlement of Industrial Disputes extending beyond the Limits of any one State
- Citation: No. 13 of 1904
- Territorial extent: States and territories of Australia
- Royal assent: 15 December 1904

Legislative history
- Bill title: Commonwealth Conciliation and Arbitration Bill 1904
- Introduced by: Alfred Deakin
- Status: Repealed

The Commonwealth Conciliation and Arbitration Act 1904 (Cth) was an Act of the Parliament of Australia, which established the Commonwealth Court of Conciliation and Arbitration, besides other things, and sought to introduce the rule of law in industrial relations in Australia. The Act received royal assent on 15 December 1904.

The Act applied to industrial disputes “extending beyond the limits of any one State, including disputes in relation to employment upon State railways, or to employment in industries carried on by or under the control of the Commonwealth or a State or any public authority constituted under the Commonwealth or a State”.

The Act was amended many times and was superseded by the Industrial Relations Act 1988 and was repealed by the Industrial Relations (Consequential Provisions) Act 1988 with effect on 1 March 1989. The Industrial Relations Act 1988 was itself replaced by the Workplace Relations Act 1996.

== Background ==
=== Constitutional basis ===
The Commonwealth’s power to make the law is based on section 51(xxxv) of the Constitution, which gives the Commonwealth power to make laws "in relation to conciliation and arbitration for the prevention and settlement of industrial disputes extending beyond the limits of any one state".

More controversially, the scope of the Act was “extended” to include disputes “...in relation to employment upon State railways, or to employment in industries carried on by or under the control of the Commonwealth or a State or any public authority constituted under the Commonwealth or a State...”. It excluded disputes in “...any agricultural, viticultural, horticultural, or dairying pursuit...”.

=== History ===
The Conciliation and Arbitration Bill (1903 & 1904) was drafted by Charles Kingston, Australia's pioneer of compulsory arbitration, drawing on New Zealand's Industrial Conciliation and Arbitration Act 1894. Kingston was a Minister in Deakin's Protectionist Government, which was supported by the Labour Party. In July 1903, Kingston resigned suddenly from the Deakin government in a fit of anger over the opposition of John Forrest and Edmund Barton to an extension of conciliation and arbitration to British and foreign seamen engaged in the Australian coastal trade.

The scope of the legislation was very controversial at the time, resulting in changes of governments of Alfred Deakin (Protectionist), Chris Watson (Labour), and George Reid (Free Trade). In April 1904, Watson and Deakin fell out over the issue of extending the scope of the Conciliation and Arbitration Bill to cover state public servants. Labour members withdrew their support for Deakin, leading to the resignation of Deakin’s Government. Reid refused to form government, leading to the formation of the first Labour government led by Watson. Watson's government lasted only four months and was succeeded in August 1904 by Reid's which agreed to Labour's amendment to cover State government employees, and the Bill was passed with Labour's support.

== The Act ==
The main objects of the Act were:

- to prevent lock-outs and strikes in relation to industrial disputes
- to constitute a Commonwealth Court of Conciliation and Arbitration having jurisdiction for the prevention and settlement of industrial disputes
- to provide for the exercise of the jurisdiction of the Court by conciliation with a view to amicable agreement between the parties
- in default of amicable agreement between the parties, to provide for the exercise of the jurisdiction of the Court by equitable award
- to enable States to refer industrial disputes to the Court, and to permit the working of the Court and of State Industrial Authorities in aid of each other
- to facilitate and encourage the organization of representative bodies of employers and of employees and the submission of industrial disputes to the Court by organizations, and to permit representative bodies of employers and of employees to be declared organizations for the purposes of this Act
- to provide for the making and enforcement of industrial agreements between employers and employees in relation to industrial disputes.

== See also ==
- Australian labour law

== Further sources ==
- National Archives of Australia A fair go – a win for the workers: Conciliation and Arbitration Act 1904 (Cth)
- National Archives of Australia Documenting Democracy: Conciliation and Arbitration Act 1904

== See also ==
- WorkChoices
- Harvester Judgment
