= Esmonde Higgins =

Australian activist and educationist (1897–1960)

Personal details
- Born: 26 March 1897 Malvern, Victoria, Australia
- Died: 25 December 1960 (aged 63) Croydon, New South Wales, Australia
- Party: Communist Party of Great Britain (c. 1920-1924); Communist Party of Australia (1924-193?); Australian Labor Party (from 1944)
- Spouse: Marjorie Gardner (m. 1935)
- Relations: Nettie Palmer (sister); H. B. Higgins (uncle); Ina Higgins (aunt); Aileen Palmer (niece); Helen Palmer (niece)
- Education: University of Melbourne; Balliol College, Oxford

Esmonde Macdonald Higgins (26 March 1897 - 25 December 1960) was an Australian political activist and adult education proponent. He was a prominent figure in the early years of the Communist Party of Australia, serving as editor of its official newspaper and running its agitprop department. However, he later became disillusioned with the party and concentrated on his work with the Workers' Educational Association (WEA).

== Early life ==
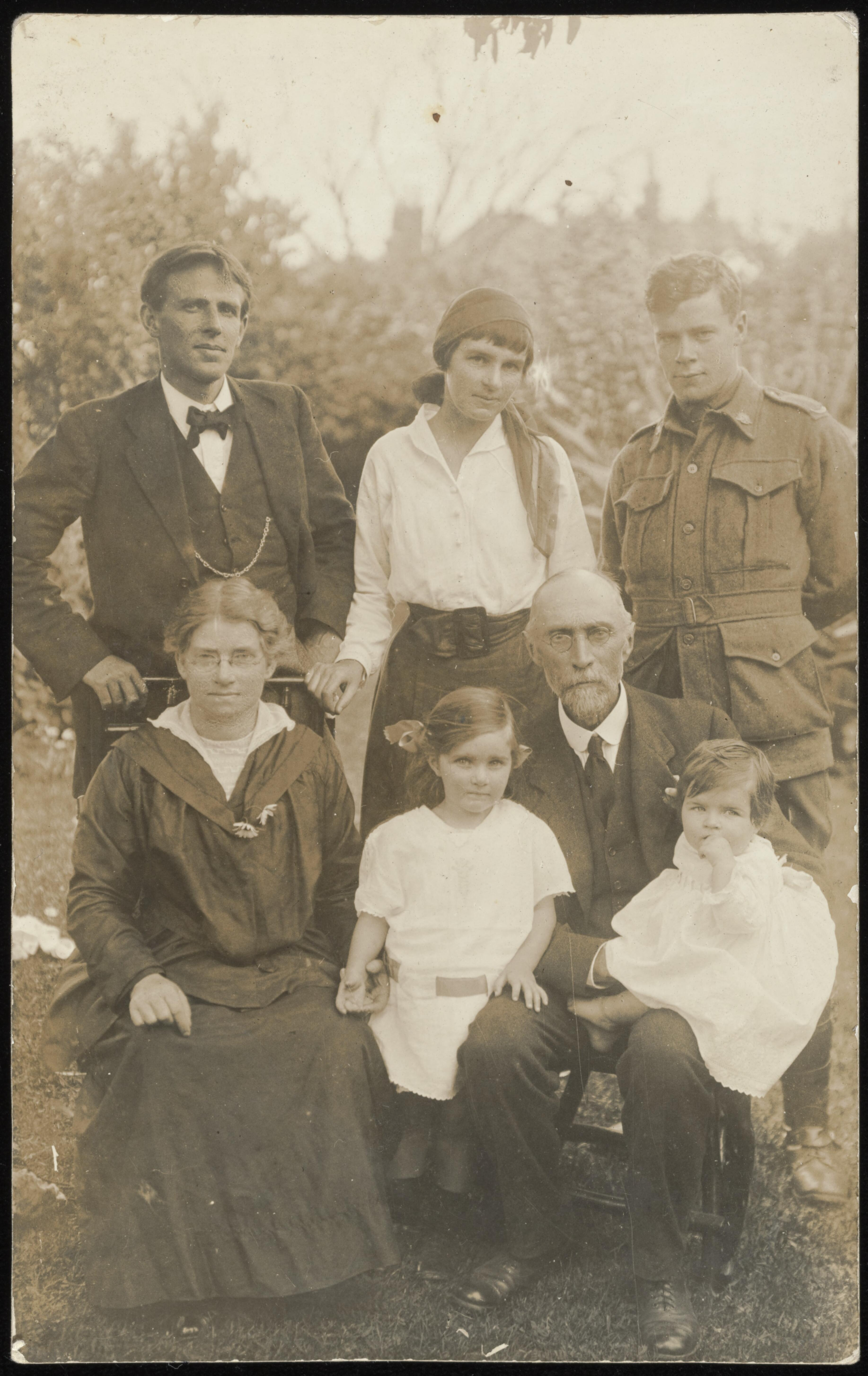
Higgins in 1918 (top row, right) with his parents, brother-in-law Vance, sister Nettie, and nieces Aileen and Helen

Higgins was born on 26 March 1897 in Malvern, Victoria. He was the second of the six surviving children of Catherine (née McDonald) and John Higgins. His sister Nettie Palmer became a prominent literary critic. Their father, an accountant, was born in Ireland, as were his siblings H. B. Higgins, who served on the High Court of Australia, and Ina Higgins, a landscape architect.

Higgins attended Scotch College, Melbourne, where he was a prefect and dux. His sister Nettie and brother-in-law Vance Palmer introduced him to the Victorian Socialist Party and Unitarian minister Frederick Sinclaire's Free Religious Fellowship. He went on to the University of Melbourne, graduating Bachelor of Arts in 1918. Although an anti-conscriptionist, he enlisted in the Australian Imperial Force (AIF) in November 1917 and served in France with the 6th Field Artillery Brigade. He was granted leave to enrol at Balliol College, Oxford, with his education financed by his uncle H. B. Higgins. However, he soon grew disillusioned with the university environment. He completed the requirements of his degree in 1921 but chose not to apply to graduate.

== Politics ==
Higgins travelled to the newly formed Soviet Union in 1920 and joined the Communist Party of Great Britain upon his return to England. He worked with the Labour Research Department in London until 1924, when he left for Sydney. He subsequently joined the Communist Party of Australia. Higgins became the director of the Labor Council's Labour Research and Information Bureau and was also the editor of the Workers' Weekly, the Communist Party's official newspaper. In letters to his former colleagues in England, including Harry Pollitt, he complained about the slow progress of the movement in Australia, stating that he "done no actual research" in three months at the bureau, was writing for a captive audience, and that some of his work was futile.

In August 1925, Higgins resigned his positions to go travelling, working as a teacher in Victoria and Western Australia, including at Wesley College, Perth. He returned to Sydney the following year and in December 1926 was elected to the Communist Party's central executive with the second-highest vote. He subsequently resumed his editorship of the Workers' Weekly and was placed in charge of the party's agitprop department. In 1928, Higgins travelled to Moscow as an Australian delegate to the 6th World Congress of the Comintern. He was re-elected to the central executive in December 1929, but was soon removed on the grounds of ill health and "condemned viciously by the dominant faction" at the party's next congress. He was denounced as a social fascist and labelled by Lance Sharkey as an agent of the kulaks.

Higgins stood as a Communist candidate at the 1930 and 1932 New South Wales state elections. In the former he polled 147 votes in the seat of Gordon and in the latter he polled 102 votes in the seat of Waverley. Higgins gradually distanced himself from the Communist Party over a period from 1934 to 1944, when he joined the Australian Labor Party (ALP). He took a keen interest in the League Against Imperialism in the early 1930s and was disillusioned by Stalinism, writing "comradely letters to Trotskyites". He nonetheless remained under the watch of the Commonwealth Investigation Branch, with his Security Service file noting he had "allegedly resigned from the Communist party [...] in 1935" but that this could have been a red herring and he was still believed to be working undercover for the party.

== Workers' Educational Association ==
In 1936, Higgins moved to northern Tasmania to lecture with the Workers' Educational Association (WEA). He later worked with the organisation in Auckland (1938–1941), Newcastle (1941–1945), and Sydney (1945–1960), with his lectures becoming "increasingly academic and apolitical" over time. He was assistant director of WEA Sydney from 1950, later returning to the University of Melbourne to complete a Master of Arts in 1954 with a thesis on the Queensland ALP governments of the 1910s and 1920s. In 1957 he wrote a memoir of David Stewart, the founder of the Australian WEA.

== Personal life ==
Higgins married Marjorie Josephine Gardner on 3 January 1935. The couple had two children. He died of cancer at his home in Croydon, New South Wales, on 25 December 1960.

== Sources ==
- Irving, Terry (2004). "Defecting: Esmonde Higgins Leaves the Communist Party". Labour History. 87 (87). Liverpool University Press: 83–102. doi:10.2307/27516000. JSTOR 27516000.
