= Melbourne Observer =

Newspaper in Victoria, Australia

- Type: Weekly newspaper
- Owner: Local Media Pty Ltd.
- Founder: Gordon Barton
- Publisher: Melbourne Press Network
- Founded: 1969
- Headquarters: 30 Glen Gully Road, Eltham, Vic 3095
- Website: http://melbobserver.com.au/wp/

The Melbourne Observer is a weekly newspaper circulated across Victoria, Australia.

== History ==
The newspaper was established by transport magnate Gordon Barton in September 1969 as the Sunday Observer, Melbourne's first Sunday newspaper. Barton ran the paper for 18 months, with a $1.5 million loss, going on to publish the Sunday Review, later known as The Review and then Nation Review.

Maxwell Newton started his version of the Melbourne Observer' in March 1971, two weeks after Barton closed his enterprise. From August 1973, the newspaper was re-titled "Sunday Observer". In about 1977, due to financial pressures, Peter Isaacson purchased the Melbourne Observer for $425,000, and ran the weekly paper until June 1989.

The Melbourne Observer was resurrected in 2002 as a midweek publication by Victorian publisher Ash Long. It has achieved a weekly readership of more than 55,000. The content sources include original columnists and contributors as well as material aggregated from other influential media sources such as social media, newspapers and on line.

== See also ==
- Official website
- National Library of Australia Newspaper Histories
