= Aileen Palmer =

(1915-1988) poet, translator and political activist

- Palmer's passport photograph, 1940
- Born: Aileen Yvonne Palmer; 6 April 1915; London, England
- Died: 21 December 1988 (aged 73); Ballarat East, Victoria, Australia
- Occupations: Writer; translator
- Years active: 1931–1960

Aileen Palmer (6 April 1915 – 21 December 1988) was a British Australian poet and diarist. She worked as an interpreter during the Spanish Civil War for a mobile hospital and later in an ambulance unit in London during The Blitz. With a history of being institutionalised for various mental breakdowns, her diaries chart her exploration of her own sexuality and mental illness. Among her papers are many unpublished novels and an autobiographical compilation, which form a notable collection for scholars to evaluate both gender identities and mental health in her era.

== Early life ==
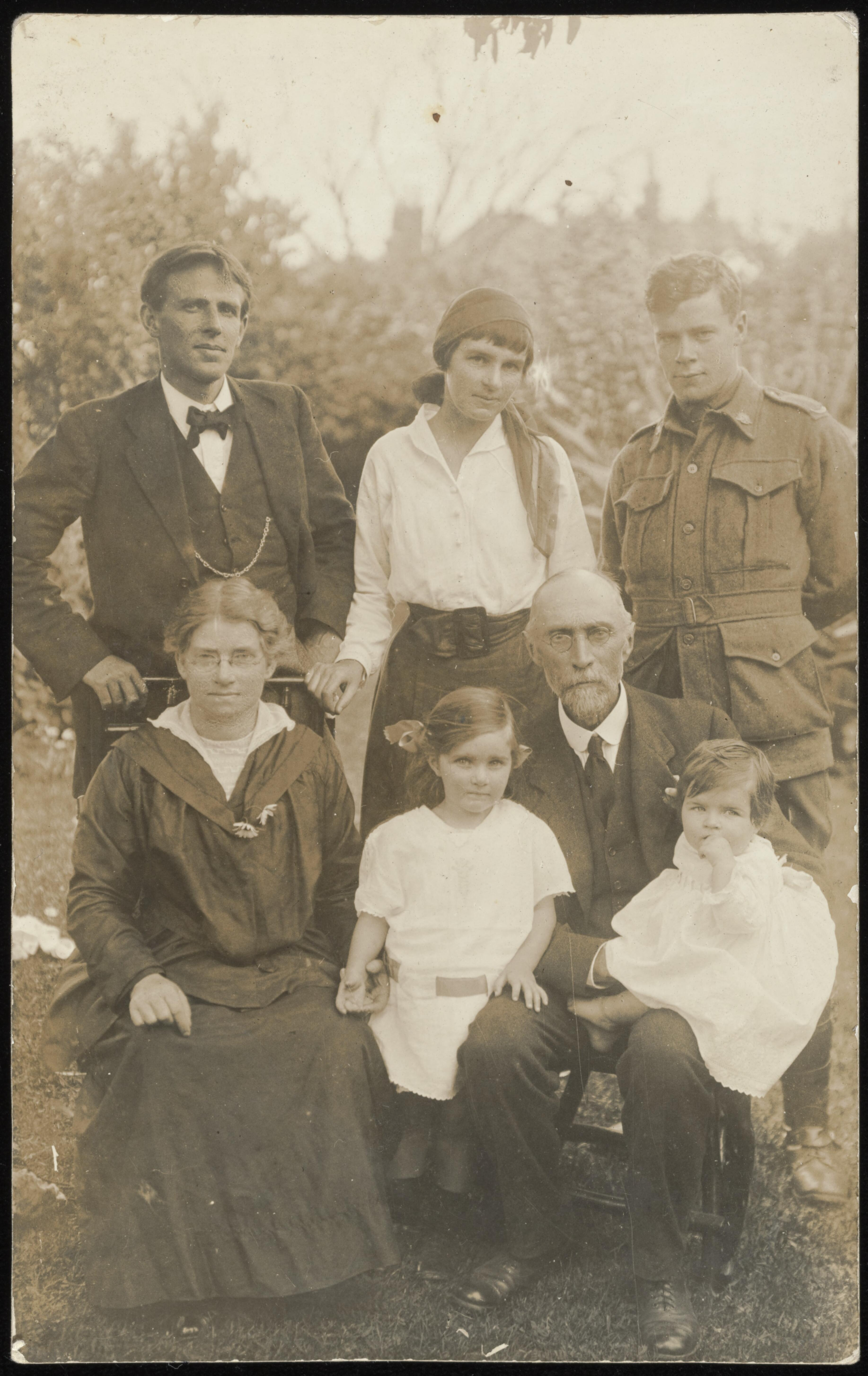
Palmer in 1918 (bottom row, second from left) with her parents, maternal grandparents, sister Helen, and uncle Esmonde

Aileen Yvonne Palmer was born on 6 April 1915, in London to two of Australia's most noted literary figures, Nettie (née Janet Gertrude Higgins) and Edward Vivian Palmer, known as Vance. Within six months of her birth, Palmer's parents had returned to their native Australia, setting up their home in the Dandenong Ranges, near Melbourne. In 1917, her sister Helen was born and the two girls began their education at home, schooled by their mother. In the 1920s, the family moved to Caloundra in South East Queensland, where Nettie continued their education. She was described as a shy child, who had myopia and was left-handed.

In 1929, the family moved to Melbourne, and Palmer enrolled in Presbyterian Ladies' College. She went on to complete her education, studying French, German, Spanish and Russian, graduating from the University of Melbourne with First-class honours in French language and literature in 1935. While she was in school around 1931, she began writing an autobiographical novel, Poor Child—a Posthumous Novel in which she discusses her awkwardness, as well as her infatuations with various teachers. She also wrote of a psychology book on sexual inverts, which one of her teachers had given her to read. Her 1932 diary also retells the relationships and activities of a group of young women, which Palmer calls "the mob". Though ostensibly written as a private journal, comments by other members of the mob indicate it was probably an open document, at least to other members of her circle. Written in code, using abbreviations and obscure terms, the women appear to have been emotionally interconnected and shared an interest in reading and writing music and poetry, as well as shared physical intimacy.

== European sojourn ==
Palmer began working as an activist before graduating from university. Enrolling in the Communist Party of Australia in 1934, she worked on the immigration campaign for Egon Kisch. Soon after her graduation, she travelled with her family to London and participated in anti-racist rallies. She journeyed on to Vienna, where she spent three months translating works by Helene Scheu-Riesz, before moving on to Spain. In 1936, she was engaged as a translator for the planned People's Olympiad, but the event was circumvented by the start of the Spanish Civil War. At the time, Palmer was living in a house rented near Barcelona by her parents in Mongat. When the Coup d'état occurred, she and her family were evacuated via Marseille to London. Having not wanted to leave, Palmer separated from her parents in France, contacted her friend Isabel Brown, who worked in the communist circles in London, and joined a British medical unit. Originally hired as a typist, she served as a secretary and an interpreter in Spain for the next two years.

Working on the battle front from August 1936 to the middle of 1938, Palmer rode with ambulance drivers and kept records of the wounded, sending injury and death reports to the central war office. During the Battle of Brunete, fighting was intense and the field hospital was close to the action, which led Palmer to feel depressed and unstable. She asked for leave, which was finally granted in August 1937. Though her parents urged her to remain in England, Palmer returned to Spain the following month, where she joined the 35th Hospital Division in Aragon. By December, the unit was in Teruel, in sub-zero temperatures, with food and supply shortages and intense fighting, retreat and recapture. Eventually the medical staff were evacuated and returned to a medical hospital in Barcelona. When Franco's troops divided Spain in half, in May 1938, Palmer returned to London. She worked for the National Joint Committee for Spanish Relief through 1939, distributing leaflets, carrying out publicity events, and attending rallies. She wrote a novel, Last Mile to Huesca about her time in Spain, though it remained unpublished. (Note: A book by the same title, written by Judith Keene, who also wrote a biography about Palmer, was not about Palmer, but instead about the Australian nurse, Agnes Hodgson.)

When the war ended, Palmer went to France and worked in the refugee camps, writing reports on the Spanish people. She then returned to England and working through The Blitz served in the Auxiliary Ambulance Service as a driver in Stepney during the war until 1943. At that time, she began working at Australia House and remained until summoned back to Australia due to her mother's illness.

== Return to Australia ==
In 1945, responding to a cable from her sister regarding her mother's stroke, Palmer returned to Melbourne, though she had to say goodbye to a woman who her diary indicates she was in love with. She found the return difficult, though she continued to try to write, publishing articles in journals such as Meanjin, Overland and The Realist. In 1948, she had a breakdown fuelling her efforts to continue writing at a frenetic pace with alcohol and benzedrine. She was hospitalised for the first time at a mansion known as "Alençon" in Malvern, where she was treated by Dr. Reginald Ellery. Ellery subjected Palmer to a treatment being tried in Vienna on people with schizophrenia and introverts. Ellery gave Palmer a series of insulin injections to induce coma, followed by a series of glucose injections to revive her, hoping that the shock to her system would return her to her former self. In addition to three months of insulin-glucose treatment, Palmer underwent electroconvulsive shock therapy. She wrote about the process and her relation to her mother and sister, who were the ones who had her committed in an unpublished manuscript, 20th Century Pilgrim.

In 1957, she published a mimeographed collection of poems called Dear Life and that same year, travelled as a peace activist to both China and Japan. But the following year, after a manic period, she was involuntarily committed to the Sunbury Asylum. During this stay, her sister Helen burned some of Palmer's papers, calling her writing "drivel", though Helen's perspective on the worth of the writing differed from publishers. Around the same time, Helen called a piece, Song for a Distant Epoch, published by Meanjin incoherent, when in reality it was a modernist lament on the threat of nuclear annihilation. The poet, David Martin dubbed Palmer as the poet of the talented Palmer family and wrote, the reasons for her tragedy were "the war in Spain, her failure to escape the Palmer constellation, and her sexuality". In 1959, Palmer published translations in Hanoi of Tố Hữu, the Vietnamese dissident from their original French. She also published in Vietnam a translation from French of the Prison Diaries of Ho Chi Minh in 1962. In 1964, World Without Strangers?, a volume of original poems was published in 1964, but her autobiographical novel, Pilgrim's Way was never published.

== Sexuality and mental illness ==
Palmer has been identified by some scholars as a lesbian and by others as non-binary, or possibly transgender, as it is currently understood, because of her writings which convey that she had trouble identifying as a woman. She wrote about wanting to be a boy in her childhood and though she acknowledged that she had had lesbian relationships, she also mused that she had been born into the wrong body. Because of her lengthy periods of institutionalisation, she refers to her lesbian alliances as "incidents", thus it is difficult to determine if she had a genuine desire, or if her own thoughts had been moulded by therapy. It is clear that Palmer considered herself to be an outsider, publishing poetry under the pseudonym Caliban, a character in Shakespeare's The Tempest.

The archive also calls into question how one separates fact from fiction, as for example, Palmer's autobiographical manuscript Pilgrim's Way, exists in over 20 versions scattered throughout the collection, with the same event being told with variations on the same facts, or with totally new versions. In some versions, as in her letters, Palmer employs an alter-ego known as Moira Y. Pilgrim, but it is difficult to determine if one is a fictional character or another manifestation of herself. It is also difficult to know if the many versions were written to somehow appease her family, who had burned a portion of her documents during one hospitalisation, but she did begin sending versions to friends after that incident, perhaps to "protect" them from another such incident.

As with the 1932 diary, written while she was in college, Palmer's later diaries use code, or eliminate names, possibly because she fears someone may read them. In her London diaries, she relates a relationship with a woman "B" which may have continued over a five-year period. In two different versions of Pilgrim's Way, Palmer writes that she left her heart in England during the war and in the other says she left pieces of her heart all over Europe. Significant difference between the versions calls into question of whether the second version was a self-censored retelling for perhaps having been too specific in the first version. In yet another version, she names her lover as Harry, changing the gender and blurring which might be the factual and which might be the fictional rendition of the story.

In the same vein, the nature of her illness is unclear and obscure. In some descriptions, such as one given by her sister Helen, Palmer is labelled as a manic-depressive. In her own writings, she recounts symptoms like those described by people with posttraumatic stress disorder, obsessing over the deaths she encountered in Spain and bombings in London. It is equally possible that the "drivel" burned by her sister Helen, were writings attempting to deal with the traumas Palmer had experienced in her life.

== Death and legacy ==
Palmer died on 21 December 1988 at Ballarat East in a psychiatric facility and was buried in the local cemetery. Her papers and unfinished manuscripts were donated to Canberra's National Library of Australia and contain diaries, letters, speeches, as well as unpublished manuscripts. The archives have provided a wealth of materials to scholars giving insight and at the same time obscuring Palmer's history. As historian Sylvia Martin wrote, "her illness and its treatment affected her subjectivity, but the context of her life affected her politics and her writing and, indeed, her illness. Furthermore, the circulating narratives relating to war, poetry, madness, gender and sexuality exist in a dynamic relation to her writing and behaviour, which in turn became part of her diagnosis and treatment. It is a tangled web". In 1988, a biography was written by historian Judith Keene about Palmer and in 2016 Sylvia Martin published Ink in her Veins: The Troubled Life of Aileen Palmer to recover the untold story of Palmer's military service, lesbianism, and troubled life.
