= Fitzgerald Report =

Fitzgerald Report may refer to:

- FitzGerald Report, an inquiry to determine the circumstances and consequences of the assassination of former Lebanese Prime Minister Rafik Hariri
- Fitzgerald Report or Fitzgerald Inquiry, a 1989 inquiry into police misconduct in Queensland presided over by Tony Fitzgerald
- Fitzgerald Report - The contribution of the mineral industry to Australian welfare : report to the Minister for Minerals and Energy by Tom Fitzgerald
