= Nation (Australian periodical) =

Former periodical in Australia

Nation was an Australian fortnightly periodical, published from 1958 to 1972, when it was merged with the Sunday Review to form the Nation Review.

== Origins ==
Tom Fitzgerald was the Financial Editor of The Sydney Morning Herald. Whilst retaining his post at the Herald, in 1956 he developed the idea of an independent, liberal-minded journal, as an antidote to the general conservative stuffiness of Australian print media at the time. He established Nation in 1958, installing George Munster as editor. Fitzgerald and Munster were introduced by Barry Humphries.

Fitzgerald launched Nation in the same year as Sir Frank Packer launched his fortnightly news magazine Observer; they were published on alternate fortnights until 1961 when Packer merged Observer into The Bulletin. Both were printed by the quixotic Francis James's Anglican Press, for a time in the crypt of Christ Church St Laurence.

== Publication history ==
The first edition was published on 26 September 1958. Nation published stories that the mainstream press was not prepared to print, such as Ken Inglis's 1959 article about Max Stuart, an Arrernte Aborigine who had been convicted of the murder of a nine-year-old girl and sentenced to death. Nation campaigned strongly against the White Australia Policy and Australia's involvement in the Vietnam War.

Other contributors to Nation included economist G. C. Harcourt, film critic Sylvia Lawson, historian Hugh Stretton, theatre critic H. G. Kippax, columnist Peter Ryan, and social historian Cyril Pearl. When The Australian began publication in 1964, a number of contributors to Nation moved to the new daily newspaper, including Brian Johns, Ken Gott, Robin Boyd, Robert Hughes, Maxwell Newton and Max Harris.

== Closure ==
Fitzgerald sold Nation to Gordon Barton in 1972, who then merged it with his Sunday Review to form Nation Review. The last edition of Nation was published on 22 July 1972.

An anthology of work from Nation was edited by Ken Inglis in 1989 under the title Nation: The Life of an independent journal of opinion, 1958–1972, (1989: Melbourne University Press).

== In popular culture ==
Frank Moorhouse's Conferenceville (1976) mentions Nation and Vadim's Restaurant in Sydney's Kings Cross where the paper's contributors used to meet until it closed in 1969:

"Were you a Vadim's person?" I asked. She was roughly my age. I always put Vadim's cafe before our time. But Cindy had started life pretty early. "Yes, yes, I belonged everywhere then," she put out a sigh. "All the good ideas in this country started at Vadim's. Fitzgerald. The Nation people."

In his memoir Things I Didn't Know (2007), art critic Robert Hughes describes Fitzgerald and Munster walking across Kings Cross, after Vadim's had closed for the night, "to take up a laminate table at a hamburger joint named Hasty Tasty... and finish their editing there".
