= Daily Cargo News =

Australian magazine

- Type: Monthly magazine
- Format: Tabloid
- Publisher: Lindsay Reed
- Editor: Ian Ackerman
- Founded: 1891
- Headquarters: Crows Nest, New South Wales, Australia
- ISSN: 2203-1464
- Website: www.thedcn.com.au

Daily Cargo News (DCN) is a monthly Australian shipping, trade, transport and logistics focused magazine, published by Daily Cargo News Pty Ltd. First published in 1891 as Daily Commercial News, Daily Cargo News is Australia's longest running national newspaper.

== History ==
=== Daily Commercial News ===
Howard Ignatius Moffat, born in Redfern, New South Wales in 1861, traveled to the United States at an early age to study American business methods. He returned to Sydney in 1887 intent on establishing a shipping newspaper, founding Shipping Newspapers Ltd under the name The Daily Shipping Paper in November 1890 with business partner Jeremiah Roberts. On 13 April 1891, the first edition of Daily Commercial News (DCN) was published. On 30 April 1892 the newspaper changed its title to Daily Commercial News and Shipping List.

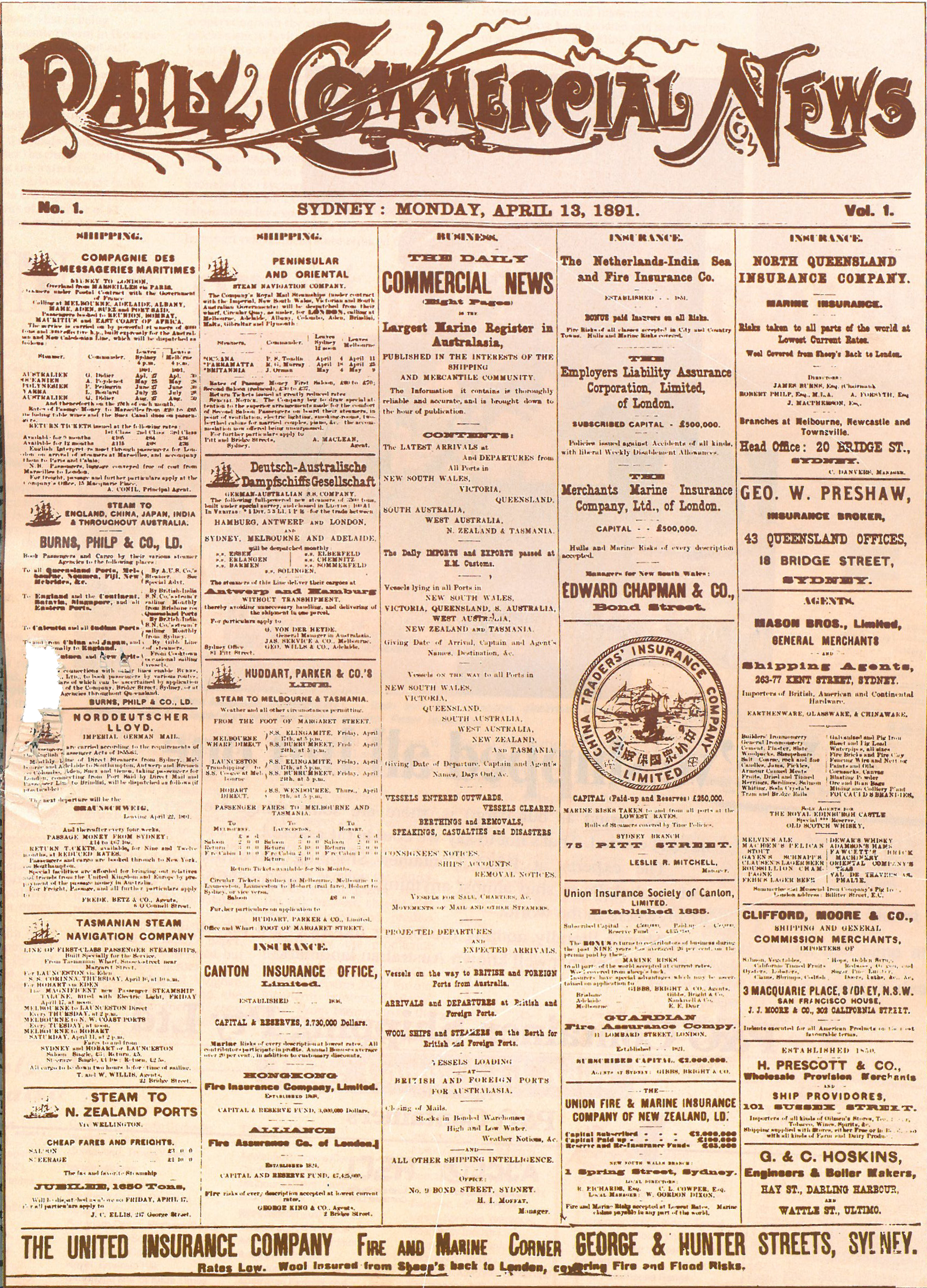
Daily Commercial News, Issue 1, 13 April 1891

Moffat remained the driving force behind the newspaper until ill health and failing eyesight forced his retirement in 1935. His retirement coincided with the financial crisis resulting from The Great Depression. Like so many other businesses at the time, DCN found itself in a difficult position. The National Bank of Australia stepped in and appointed a receiver, Charles Witt. The rescue was so successful that shareholders persuaded him to remain on as chairman, which he did until his retirement in 1962.

During World War II, Australian authorities sought suspension of publication of all shipping movements for fear that the information could fall into enemy hands. With the strong support of the Australian shipping industry a compromise was reached – only after a ship had sailed, returned and sailed again would its original sailing be published. This policy was revoked at the conclusion of the war.

For over 50 years DCN's were at 16 Bond Street, Sydney, which had extra floors added over the decades to accommodate peak staffing levels of over 1,000 employees. In 1962 new Chairman Raymond Morris initiated a move to a new building in North Sydney. A site on the corner of Hill Plaza and Elizabeth Street was purchased from P&O for £60,000. An old building on the site was demolished and Shipnews House was erected. Marine artist John Charles Allcot created the iconic sailing ship for the building, whose port and starboard lights illuminated at night, a landmark for passers-by on the nearby Pacific Highway.

By 1966 Shipping Newspapers Ltd had expanded to include subsidiaries in Melbourne, Adelaide, Perth and Brisbane, each with its own printing plant. The group also included The Manufacturer Publishing Company, The Commonwealth Jeweller and Watchmaker, Marchant & Co General Printers and Broadway Typesetters.

Asset rich, but underperforming in share value, Shipping Newspapers Ltd became a prime target for corporate raiders. Sir Ronald Brierley purchased the company in 1969, dividing and selling its assets. Subsequently, DCN was sold to businessman Maxwell Newton with funding from Marrickville Holdings. In 1981 Peter Isaacson bought the newspaper from the liquidators of Maxwell Newton. Peter Isaacson Publications was acquired by Independent News & Media's Australian media arm, Australian Provincial Newspapers (APN) in 1993, where DCN remained until purchased by Informa in 1999.

In total, the Daily Commercial News ran for 108 years under its original banner. During this time it occupied a unique position amongst a select group as one of only three national Australian daily newspapers alongside The Australian and Australian Financial Review - yet with a much more tightly defined market and readership than its colleagues.

=== Lloyd's List in Australia ===
Early in 1993, Lloyd's List, one of the world's oldest daily newspapers investigated the possibility of extending its international publishing service. The proposal was to launch a weekly version of its newspaper in Australia combining Lloyd's List's traditional international coverage with an extensive coverage of national shipping events in Australia.

Under the guidance of Publisher and Chief Executive Lloyd's of London Press (LLP), David Gilbertson, a joint venture was formed with a private Australian publishing company, Westonprint, of Kiama on the south coast of NSW. Westonprint already provided print and distribution services for several international weekly versions of well known newspapers, including The Guardian and Scottish Daily Record.

At the time, the Australian maritime media market was dominated by the Daily Commercial News (DCN), a five-day weekly national newspaper. Following extensive local market research by LLP through Lloyd's List's Managing Director, Ian Ormes, Advertisement Director, John Quilter and Peter Attwater (Managing Editor of Westonprint) David Gilbertson authorized the decision to enter the Australian market with a weekly newspaper.

The newspaper was called Lloyd's List Australian Weekly (LLAW). It was first published on Monday, 30 August 1993.

A senior journalist on Lloyd's List, Leigh Smith, was chosen to head the project as editor. He was joined by Advertising Manager, Adrian Pickstock, who had recently joined LLP in London. Initially, they set up an office in a rented home in Moverly Road in the Sydney metropolitan coastal suburb of Maroubra. There, articles were written and advertisements sold. The newspaper was in profit from the outset.

The stories were transmitted back to Lloyd's List in London where the compilation of the newspaper took place by Lloyd's List production staff. The completed editorial pages of the newspaper were then transmitted back to Westonprint in Australia where advertisements were manually inserted and production completed before printing and distribution took place.

Smith and Pickstock carried the entire editorial and advertising project for several months and when it became clear that LLAW was making headway, they were joined by their wives – but not just for comfort. Smith's wife, Clare Longley, was an accomplished journalist and joined the editorial team while Pickstock's wife Ellen, briefly joined the sales team. David Worwood, formerly features editor with DCN, further strengthened the editorial team from early 1994. As deputy editor the following year he proposed LLAW establish a website including shipping schedules and news. The free website proved an immediate success - contrasting with the expensively designed electronic commerce offering from rival DCN, which required subscribers to pay. Leigh Smith continued as editor of LLAW until 1995 when he returned to London to join corporate public relations with BP. He was replaced by Kevin Chinnery, then the editor of Lloyd's List Maritime Asia. Adrian Pickstock left LLAW in June 1997.

In 1995, the Maroubra house was abandoned for a new office at Suite 1005, Level 10, Bondi Junction Plaza (Tower 1) in Bondi Junction which was to serve as the home of LLAW until 1999.

The front page of Lloyd's List DCN on 4 October 2007

=== Merger and formation of Lloyd's List DCN ===
1998 was a pivotal year for LLAW, and as it transpired, for the DCN. David Gilbertson successfully led a management buyout of LLP and the company was successfully listed on the London Stock Exchange. Now cashed up, LLP made a play to acquire LLAW's dominating competitor, the DCN. It was a long process and complicated by the decision of LLP to merge with a London-based international conference company, IBC Conferences. This merger was completed at the end of 1998 and resulted in the creation of Informa plc.

Under the Informa banner, the acquisition of the DCN was completed in March 1999 for A$10m. Announcing the purchase, Gilbertson stated "Daily Commercial News is a powerful and long established title in the Australian market. In combination with our weekly publication, Lloyd's List Australian Weekly, the acquisition of DCN will enable Informa to offer an unrivalled information service to the Australian import and export community".

For several weeks following, the DCN and LLAW continued to publish on their normal schedules until the newspapers were merged. On Monday 12 April 1999, the first edition of the now Lloyd's List DCN was published by an editorial, advertising, subscriptions and production team made up a staff from both the DCN and LLAW. LLAW editor Kevin Chinnery edited the combined publication for a further seven years until the end of 2006 when he joined Business Review Weekly as its weekly editor. Former LLDCN deputy editor Sandy Galbraith edited the publication until September 2007, when he moved into shipping consultancy, and was replaced by LLDCN Sydney correspondent Sam Collyer who edited the paper until July 2010 when he left to pursue a public relations career with Caltex. Jim Wilson, then the Asia-Pacific editor of shipping publication Fairplay, was recruited from Singapore and moved to Australia to become editor of LLDCN. Jim edited the publication for six years, leaving for a role at Sydney Business Chamber in October 2016.

=== Rebrand to Lloyd's List Australia ===
On 24 November 2011, at the 16th annual Australian Shipping & Maritime Industry Awards, publisher Peter Attwater announced that Lloyd's List DCN was to be re-branded as Lloyd's List Australia to give the publication a "clear national focus". The change was immediate, with issue 901 (24 November 2011) the first to appear under the new masthead. The paper ran as Lloyd's List Australia and published by Informa Australia for a further 6 years, until a change in regional strategy saw Informa divest their entire Australian publishing business. All of their titles, including Lloyd's List Australia, were placed on the market in January 2017.

=== Acquisition by Paragon Media, rebrand to Daily Cargo News ===
In June 2017, specialist trade publisher Paragon Media completed the acquisition of Lloyd's List Australia. The paper continued to run under the Lloyd's List Australia masthead for a further four months, as staff and assets were relocated from Informa's Sydney office to the Paragon Media office in Crows Nest. In October 2017 the masthead was changed to Daily Cargo News, whose acronym, DCN, is a homage to the original name and heritage of the newspaper.

Today, Daily Cargo News operates from its Crows Nest headquarters and it is currently edited by Ian Ackerman. It remains a totally subscribed publication with a daily e-mail newswire service to several thousand readers. In July 2018, Daily Cargo News moved to a monthly magazine format.

== Editorial coverage & content ==
When the paper was founded in 1891, Howard Moffat described the editorial policy as "containing latest particulars on all matters connected with shipping – imports, exports &c". Early editions of the newspaper contained general shipping and trade news, commercial shipping schedules, passenger shipping itineraries, insurance news, shipping casualties and ship manifests.

By 1920, editorial coverage had begun to diversify beyond the maritime trade sector with the launch of the weekly "Airways News" section. In 1933 both road and rail transport were also included, expanding the coverage to the full gamut of trade and intermodal door-to-door transport.

As the shift towards containerisation and purpose-built container ships gained momentum in the 1950s, publication of shipping manifests became less frequent. By 1964 manifests had been completely replaced by container unpack notifications letting owners know when their containers had cleared customs. Around the same time, the popularisation of airline travel reduced the amount of cruise vessels serving passenger routes between Australia and Europe/North America. As a result, maritime coverage slowly moved entirely towards commercial matters.

The editorial focus remained largely unchanged for the next 40 years, with the addition of a digital offering in 1994 and the publication of news and vessel information online.

The decline of Australian flagged commercial vessels in the 1990s and early 2000s meant that by 2005 editorial focus began to shift away from serving shipping lines themselves and instead reporting information about shipping lines to third party businesses such as logistics operators, freight forwarders, customs brokers, insurance companies, analysts and import/export departments.

On 28 May 2009, after 118 years in print, vessel sailing schedules were removed from the newspaper in favour of being hosted online. The following year, airfreight and road transport were removed from the editorial policy and rail coverage was moved from the newspaper to a new stand-alone publication named Rail Express.

Today, Daily Cargo News primarily covers news and trends in container, liner and bulk shipping, ports, logistics, freighting and customs broking, supply chain & logistics, dry bulk trades, project cargo, government policy, law, regulation and shipping's impact on the environment.

== Current portfolio ==
Daily Cargo News's current publishing stable includes the monthly magazine, a website, four different daily e-mail newswires, and an annual directory:

Title	Format	Frequency	Notes
Daily Cargo News	Magazine	Monthly	Weekly shipping, trade, transport and logistics news & analysis
DCN Newswire	E-mail	Daily	Daily shipping, trade, transport and logistics news updates
Data Reports	Website	Daily	Vessels due, vessels in port, voyage itineraries and liner schedules
Vessel Arrivals Report	E-mail	Daily	Daily e-mail containing all arrivals at five major Australian container ports in addition to Port Kembla
Sydney Container Unpack Report	E-mail	Daily	Daily e-mail containing shipping container unpacks at Port Botany (Sydney)
Melbourne Container Unpack Report	E-mail	Daily	Daily e-mail containing shipping container unpacks at Port of Melbourne
Vessels in Port Report	E-mail	Twice Daily	Twice daily email customisable report that provides arrival, departure and berthing details for all Australian ports.

== Australian Shipping & Maritime Industry Awards ==
The Australian Shipping & Maritime Industry Awards have been held every November since 1995. As of 2011 there are 16 award categories which recognise achievements in liner trading, freight forwarding, maritime safety, project cargo, seafarers welfare, maritime services, supply chain and young achievement.

Nominations are open to the general public thus any person may nominate another company, corporation, organisation or individual for any award. Winners of 14 of the awards are selected by a combination of votes from a judging panel consisting of industry peers and popular vote by the readers of Daily Cargo News. The final two award winners, Newsmaker of the Year and the annual induction to the Australian Maritime Hall of Fame, are determined by the editorial staff of Daily Cargo News.

Hosts of the awards ceremony have included former Australian cricket player Mike Whitney and television personality Sam Kekovich.

== Charity ==
Daily Cargo News participates in a number of staff and industry driven charity initiatives, most notably the annual Shipping Industry Golf Challenge. To date this event has raised over A$633,000 for the oncology unit at Westmead Children's Hospital.

== Digitisation ==
The paper has been partially digitised as part of the Australian Newspapers Digitisation Program project of the National Library of Australia.

== See also ==
- List of newspapers in Australia
- List of newspapers in New South Wales
