= Vance and Nettie Palmer =

Vance and Netty Palmer may refer to:

- Vance Palmer (1885–1959), Australian novelist, dramatist, essayist and critic
- Nettie Palmer (1885–1964), Australian poet, essayist and Australia's leading literary critic of her day; wife of Vance Palmer
