= Maxwell Newton =

Australian media publisher

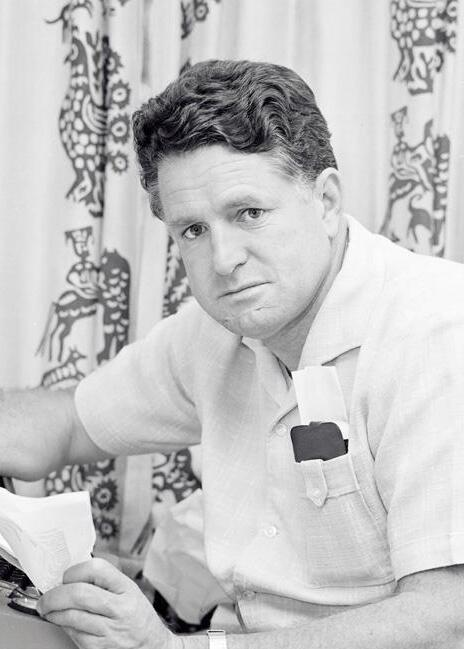
- Newton in 1969
- Born: 29 April 1929; Cottesloe, Western Australia
- Died: 23 July 1990 (aged 61); Boca Raton, Florida, United States of America
- Occupation: Publisher
- Known for: Melbourne Observer; Daily Commercial News; Canberra Post
- Spouse(s): Anne née Robertson (1952); Diane née Austin (1976); Olivia (Valerie) née Waldron (1981)
- Children: Sarah; Anthony; Penelope; Natasha; Sally; Emma-Jane

Maxwell Newton (29 April 1929 – 23 July 1990) was an Australian journalist, newspaper editor and publisher. He was a founding editor of The Australian. He was the owner of Daily Commercial News from 1969 to 1981, publisher of the Melbourne Observer from 1971 to 1977, and, during a similar time frame, the Canberra Post.

== Biography ==
Maxwell Newton was born to George William Newton, lead-burner, and his wife Nora Christian, legal secretary, on 28 April 1928 at Nurse Doyle's Private Hospital, in Cottesloe, Western Australia. The family lived with Nora's parents at 17 York Terrace, Mosman Park. At the age of four they moved to Bayswater where Newton was to attend Bayswater State School until the age of 12, when he won a scholarship to the academically selective Perth Modern School. From there he matriculated with exhibitions in English and history.

Newton graduated from the University of Western Australia with first class honours in economics and was awarded a Hackett scholarship to attend Clare College, Cambridge.

From 1960 to 1964 Newton was editor of the Australian Financial Review, turning it from a weekly to a daily. In 1964 he became founding editor of The Australian but left in March 1965, after falling out with its owner, Rupert Murdoch. He then became correspondent for the London Economist and the Financial Times and in June 1965 began a weekly newsletter in Canberra, the Incentive (sub-titled A Weekly Report on Business Trends and Economic Policy by Maxwell Newton). In 1957, he became political correspondent for the Sydney Morning Herald in Canberra. Future Prime Minister Billy McMahon would leak details of cabinet meetings to Newton, who would then publish them.

In April 1969 Newton became founding editor of the Sunday Independent (Western Australia) published by Lang Hancock and E. A. "Peter" Wright.

In 1969, Newton purchased shipping and commercial newspaper Daily Commercial News from Sir Ronald Brierley with funding from Marrickville Holdings. Soon after, in 1971, Newton published the Melbourne Observer after Gordon Barton closed his Sunday Observer. Newton later renamed his publication as the Sunday Observer. As the paper was only issued once a week Newton began publishing teen magazines (such as Scream and Sweet), entertainment publications (National Tattler and TV Guide) and soft-core pornography (Pleazure, Eros and Kings Cross Whisper) to keep the presses running.

== Newton Comics ==
In 1975 he started publishing Marvel Comics reprints, including Fantastic Four, Spider-Man, Avengers, Incredible Hulk and an edition of Planet of the Apes. The first Newton Comics titles were issued in May 1975, accompanied by a massive marketing campaign. The heavy promotion initially paid off with sales of up to 30,000 recorded for the first issues, dropping to around 20,000 for the second and third issues. After a few months sales had dropped to 6,000-8,000 per issue. It soon became apparent that sales projections were grossly overestimated, with print runs being too high and returns from newsagents being substantial. By the end of 1976, Newton Comics was defunct.

Following the collapse of his publishing empire, Newton relocated to the United States and re-established his career as a right-wing economic journalist becoming financial editor of the New York Post, with his columns syndicated in the Murdoch press. In 1983, he published a book on the American monetary system. He died on 23 July 1990, aged 61.
