= Frank Knopfelmacher =

Australian academic (1923–1995)

Frank Knopfelmacher (Vienna, 3 February 1923 – Melbourne, 17 May 1995) was a Czech Jew who migrated to Australia in 1955 and became a psychology lecturer and anticommunist political commentator at the University of Melbourne. He engaged in vigorous polemics with many members of the left-wing intelligentsia from the Vietnam War period onwards, and through his teaching had a formative impact on many Australian postwar thinkers and writers such as Raimond Gaita and Robert Manne.

== Early life ==
Knopfelmacher was born into an upper-middle-class Czech Jewish family in Vienna and enjoyed a happy childhood until the Anschluss, the annexation of Austria in 1938. Recognizing that his life was in danger, he fled the country in November 1939 with other members of a Zionist youth group and joined a kibbutz in Palestine. In January 1942, he joined the Communist Party and spent the remainder of World War II as a member of the Free Czech Forces, attached to the British Army. Every member of his family in Vienna was murdered in the Holocaust.

Prague, where he had returned in 1945, had been taken over by the Communists. Reading Arthur Koestler's Darkness at Noon had soured his opinion of them, and he used money from his family estate to bribe officials into letting him flee to England. He thereafter detested the Soviet Union, while continuing to revere Karl Marx as a man, whom, as late as July 1983, he defended, in a Quadrant article).

== Academic career ==
Knopfelmacher completed a doctorate in philosophy and psychology at the University of Bristol. In 1955, he moved to Melbourne and took up a lectureship at University of Melbourne's Psychology Department.

Few outside professional circles had heard of him until 1965, when he applied and was approved for a post in political philosophy at the University of Sydney but had his appointment blocked, in what became a front-page cause célèbre, by the University Senate.

The Senate considered Knopfelmacher's published criticisms of Moscow, and its apologists, to be unduly strong meat. He had written of Melbourne leftists that "like rats, they wish to operate in the dark" (Twentieth Century magazine, Volume 18, 1964). Those firmly supporting him included Sydney philosopher David Malet Armstrong, who called Knopfelmacher "a man fatally ahead of his time by a few years. A short time afterwards academic rebels were saying pretty much anything they liked, how they liked, about their opponents. If anyone tried to censure them or impede their careers as a result of this, the shouts that their academic freedom had been violated were deafening. To Knopfelmacher, however... Saki's saying applied: it is the first Christian martyr who gets the hungriest lion."

== Association with right-wing figures ==
Catholic activist B.A. Santamaria stated (in his 1969 book Point of View) that, compared with Knopfelmacher's opponents, "Pontius Pilate was an amateur!". During the late 1960s Knopfelmacher (still lecturing at Melbourne University) became de facto academic leader of those usually associated with the Santamaria-controlled Peace With Freedom group, who favoured continuing Australian military involvement in the Vietnam War. He became a strong proponent of the controversial drive for Australian conscription and the method of conscription by lottery.

When, in 1972, Australia's involvement in the Vietnam War ended (with the election of the Whitlam government), Knopfelmacher's long-standing intellectual unpredictability became more pronounced. He turned vehemently against Santamaria. In The Age on 7 April 1984, he likened Santamaria's treatment of trade-union opponents to Stalin's treatment of Trotskyists; this assertion was clearly libellous, but Santamaria refused to press charges. The previous year (Quadrant, October 1983), Knopfelmacher had directed some of his most sarcastic prose against Santamaria's supporters among conservative Catholic activists.

His self-contradictions did not end there. In 1977, he had proclaimed, in an article in the short lived Sydney magazine Nation Review, that "Australia is a deeply racist nation" and lauded Indochinese refugee arrivals, viewing their acceptance by the immigration authorities as a debt of honour that Australia owed to its defeated allies. Within five years he executed a complete volte-face in condemning multiculturalism in sharp terms and calling it an "ethnic cauldron" (The Bulletin, 24 March 1981) and "a banana republic of squabbling and mutually resentful expatriated mini-cultures, each with its own special bunch of ethnic [...] führers" (Robert Manne [ed.], The New Conservatism in Australia, St Lucia, Queensland, 1982). Elsewhere he described multiculturalism as a racket, an industry scrambling for government grants. From 1979, he denounced (especially in letters to Britain's Encounter magazine) John Bennett, the secretary of the Victorian Council for Civil Liberties, for disseminating Holocaust denial literature. Yet by 1989 he was arguing vituperatively with Jews who publicly advocated a national war crimes statute.

For all his admiration of Koestler and George Orwell, Knopfelmacher wrote far less than either man, and his hardcover bibliography amounted to one 1968 reflection, Intellectuals and Politics. (A promised full-length memoir remains in manuscript, but a brief account of his political education appeared in the 1981 anthology Twenty-Five Years of Quadrant.)

In his last years Knopfelmacher mended fences with Santamaria, who, from the early 1990s, deliberately sought reconciliations with ex-Cabinet Minister Clyde Cameron and other erstwhile foes.

== Personal life ==
Knopfelmacher married fellow refugee Jarmila "Jacka" Pick in 1944. She succumbed in 1968 to an especially cruel and protracted form of multiple sclerosis. In 1970, Knopfelmacher wed Australian teacher Susan Robinson; the couple had two children.

His protracted, usually free-wheeling, invariably slanderous late-night telephone monologues (visited alike upon associates and, more often, antagonists) retained a mythic status for decades among Australian intellectuals, not least for their superabundant four-letter words, which evoked the heyday of Kenneth Tynan and Berkeley's Filthy Speech Movement.

He died on 17 May 1995 after incurring severe injuries in a road accident following a meeting with Václav Havel. In his obituary Robert Manne wrote that Knopfelmacher was "one of the most brilliant and influential political writers and teachers in the postwar history of Melbourne University".

== Selected bibliography ==
- (1958) Paths to peace [Book Review]. Quadrant 2, 93-96.
- (1958) The threat to academic freedom. Quadrant 2, 17-26.
- (1959) On tolerance. Quadrant 3, 5-13.
- (1959) The poverty of historicism [Book Review]. Quadrant 3, 104. See also: The Poverty of Historicism
- (1960) The causes of world war three [Book Review]. Quadrant 4, 87-88.
- (1962) Conscience and freedom. Quadrant 6, 29-36.
- (1967) The consequences of Israel. Quadrant 11, 55-64.
- (1967) The most important problems. Quadrant 11, 57-63.
- (1967) My political education. Quadrant 11, 17-33.
- (1968) There are no youth movements. Quadrant 12, 27-30.
- (1968) Intellectuals and Politics: And Other Essays, Thomas Nelson, Melbourne
- (1969) The fourth world. Quadrant 13, 38-45.
- (1969) University reform. Quadrant 13, 41-50.
- (1973) The rise and fall of Anti-communism. Quadrant 17, 66-79.
- (1976) Koestler at 70. Quadrant 20, 41-46.
- (1978) Among the fleshpots - Solzhenitsyn and the west. Quadrant 22, 9-10.
- (1978) The coming madness (Book review). Quadrant 22, 74-75.
- (1979) Keeping the great in Britain. Bulletin (Sydney) 92,94,96.
- (1981) Migrants: beware of the cauldron. Bulletin (Sydney) 38,40.
- (1982) Arthur Koestler: The mole of god. Quadrant 26, 11-19.
- (1982) The case against multi-culturalism. The New Conservatism in Australia. 40-64.
- (1983) As I please: Black propaganda in Australia. Quadrant 27, 7-8.
- (1983) As I please: In (mild) defence of Karl Marx. Quadrant 27, 7-8.
- (1983) As I please: Our central weakness. Quadrant 27, 8-10.
- (1983) As I please: Social emancipation of women of Australia. Quadrant 27, 9-11.
- (1983) As I please: The Hawke Regime. Quadrant 27, 6-7.
- (1983) As I please: Traitor Burchett. Quadrant 27, 7-8.
- (1984) The banality of evil. -Book review. Quadrant 28, 64-66.
- (1984) Boring for women (with apologies to Malcolm Muggeridge). -The possible effects of Jewish neo conservatism on the feminist debate. Quadrant 28, 65-66.
- (1984) Has America recovered?. -Has America's defeat in Indochina shaken both power and morale? Quadrant 28, 67-68.
- (1984) The multicultural enterprise and its consequences. Quadrant 28, 9-11.
- (1984) The new model subversives. Quadrant 28, 15-16.
- (1984l) Nineteen eighty-four. Quadrant 28, 5-7.
- (1984) Pilatology. -Pontius Pilate. Quadrant 28, 8-10.
- (1984) What Moscow wants. Quadrant 28, 7-8.
- (1985) Against forgetting. -Discussion of ideas in John P. Roche's 'The history and impact of Marxist Leninist organizational theory' and their implications for the United States and Australia. Quadrant 29, 73-75.
- (1985) Bitburg: a very personal comment. -on Jews who capitalise on the Holocaust but weren't directly involved. Quadrant 29, 38-39.
- (1985) For whom the bell tolls. Quadrant 29, 75-76.
- (1985) For whom the bell tolls: South Africa, Australia and Israel. Quadrant 29, 75-76.
- (1985) Gulag fields. Quadrant 29, 59.
- (1985) It can't happen here?: Defecting from the free world. Quadrant 29, 51-52.
- (1985) Oceania, tis for thee. Quadrant 29, 36-37.
- (1985) Peace with freedom. Quadrant 29, 55-56.
- (1985) Stalin's daughter. Quadrant 29, 84-85.
- (1985) Wilfred Burchett's treason. Quadrant 29, 32.
- (1986) After the Geneva summit. Quadrant 30, 88-90.
- (1987) The unquiet life of Sidney Hook. Quadrant 31, 8-14.
- (1989) The Vietnam debate revisited: a perspective from the 1990s. Quadrant 33, 14-17.
- (1990) Bangs and whimpers: The Soviet crisis. Quadrant 34, 25-28.
- (1997) The threat to academic freedom. In 'The Oxford Book of Australian Essays.' (ed) Imre Salusinszky, OUP, Melbourne (ISBN 0195537394) pp. 150–155.
