= Sylvia Lawson =

Australian journalist, academic, film critic and author

Sylvia Lawson FAHA
- Lawson in 1984
- Born: 12 November 1932; Summer Hill, New South Wales, Australia
- Died: 6 November 2017 (aged 84); Carlton, Victoria, Australia
- Education: University of Sydney
- Occupations: Writer, educator
- Spouse: Keith Thomas
- Children: 3

Sylvia Lawson FAHA (12 November 1932 – 6 November 2017) was a journalist, academic and author, known for her support for cinema in Australia through her work with the Sydney Film Festival from its inception in 1954. She wrote The Archibald Paradox, a study of The Bulletin and its founder, J. F. Archibald.

== Early life and education ==
Lawson was a great-granddaughter of journalist and publisher, Louisa Lawson. Born in Summer Hill on 12 November 1932, she was the eldest of six daughters. She grew up in semi-rural Ingleburn. After attending Homebush Intermediate School, she completed her secondary education at Fort Street Girls’ High School. Lawson then studied arts at the University of Sydney. While at university she began her lifelong involvement in film, joining the Sydney University Film Group.

== Career ==
On graduation, Lawson was accepted as a cadet journalist by The Sydney Morning Herald, but was frustrated that women were forced to work only on women’s issues. In 1955 Lawson married and had to leave that job. She found employment at the Daily Mirror, but that paper similarly frustrated her ambitions. In 1958 Lawson began to contribute to Tom Fitzgerald's fortnightly publication, Nation as film critic and writing on cinema generally.

She was involved with the Sydney Film Festival from its beginning in 1954, joined the committee and co-curated the 1959 program with Robert Connell.

Lawson developed a film course at the University of Sydney, but in 1976 moved to Griffith University in Brisbane to lecture in cinema and media studies. During her time there, she wrote The Archibald Paradox, published by Allen Lane.

She moved back to Sydney in 1986 and began to write full-time, contributing to journals in Australia and overseas.

== Awards and recognition ==
For The Archibald Paradox, she was awarded the 1983 Fellowship of Australian Writers' Wilke Award, the Walter McRae Russell Award at the 1984 ASAL Awards and the Non-Fiction award at the 1984 New South Wales Premier's Literary Awards.

In 2000 Lawson was awarded an Honorary Fellowship by the Australian Academy of the Humanities.

== Bibliography ==
- Mary Gilmore, Oxford University Press, Melbourne, Vic, 1966, ISBN 9780643106765
- The Archibald Paradox: A strange case of authorship, Allen Lane, Ringwood, Vic, 1983, ISBN 0713901454
- How Simone de Beauvoir died in Australia : stories and essays, (Brissenden collection) University of New South Wales Press, Sydney, NSW, 2002, ISBN 0868405779
- The Outside Story, (Brissenden collection) Hardie Grant Books, South Yarra, Vic, 2003, ISBN 1740660714
- Demanding the Impossible : Seven essays on resistance, Melbourne University Press, Carlton, Vic, 2012, ISBN 9780522854855
- The Back of Beyond, NSW Currency Press & Canberra National Film & Sound Archive, Sydney, NSW, 2013, ISBN 9780868199757

== Personal ==
Lawson died in Carlton, Victoria on 6 November 2017. She was survived by her children, grandchildren and her sisters.
