= Bob Gould (activist) =

Australian activist and bookseller

- Born: Robert Stephen Gould; 1937
- Died: 22 May 2011 (aged 74); Newtown, New South Wales, Australia
- Occupation: Bookseller
- Political party: Australian Labor Party
- Spouses: Janet Bonser; Mairi Petersen (divorced)
- Children: 1
- Website: www.gouldsbooks.com.au

Robert Stephen Gould (1937 – 22 May 2011) was an Australian activist and bookseller. He was a leader of the anti-conscription movement, and of protests against Australian involvement in the Vietnam War, in the 1960s. He went on to become a successful second-hand bookseller.

== Politics and activism ==
Gould first came to public attention in 1966 as Convenor of the Vietnam Action Campaign, a group opposed to conscription and participation in the Vietnam War. Gould was already being described as a "habitual protester". By 1969 Gould was seen as having influence over Labor Clubs at the University of Sydney, the University of New South Wales and Macquarie University.

Gould went on to fight for many other issues, including Irish civil rights, Indonesian atrocities in East Timor, and the war on Iraq. He was a prolific writer on the many causes in which he believed. The Australian Security Intelligence Organisation (ASIO) held a file on Gould that ran to 8000 pages.

He inspired organisations like SCREW (the Society for the Cultivation of Revolution Everywhere) and the High School Students Against the Vietnam War. He was also a key supporter of the general anti-conscription movement of this time.

In 1966 Gould helped to chase and capture the attempted assassin of Labor leader Arthur Calwell.

Bob Gould joined the Australian Labor Party at the age of 17, about 1954, and remained a member of that party throughout his life.

He joined the party just as the Labor Party split of 1955 was brewing and quickly became embroiled in the struggle against the right-wing Groupers. Gould wrote about some of his experiences at that time in his essay, Bob Santamaria and Bob Gould.

While he was involved in the struggle against the Groupers, Gould has written that he was also "in the orbit" of the Communist Party of Australia, but he broke with Communist Party influence in 1956, after Khruschev's Secret Speech and the USSR's invasion of Hungary.

He obtained copies of Khruschev's speech detailing the crimes of Stalin, and distributed them to members of the Communist Party and left-wing members of the Labor Party.

Gould then made contact with Australian Trotskyists, who had opposed Joseph Stalin and Stalinism from the beginning. This group included the ironworkers union activist Nick Origlass, who worked in the Balmain shipyards and had led an important strike there in 1945.

Gould at this time was also in contact with Helen Palmer, who organised a leftist magazine, Outlook, which served as a focus for anti-Stalinist leftists who had left the Communist Party because of the 1956 events.

Gould remained a self-described anti-Stalinist Marxist for the rest of his life.

== Bookseller ==
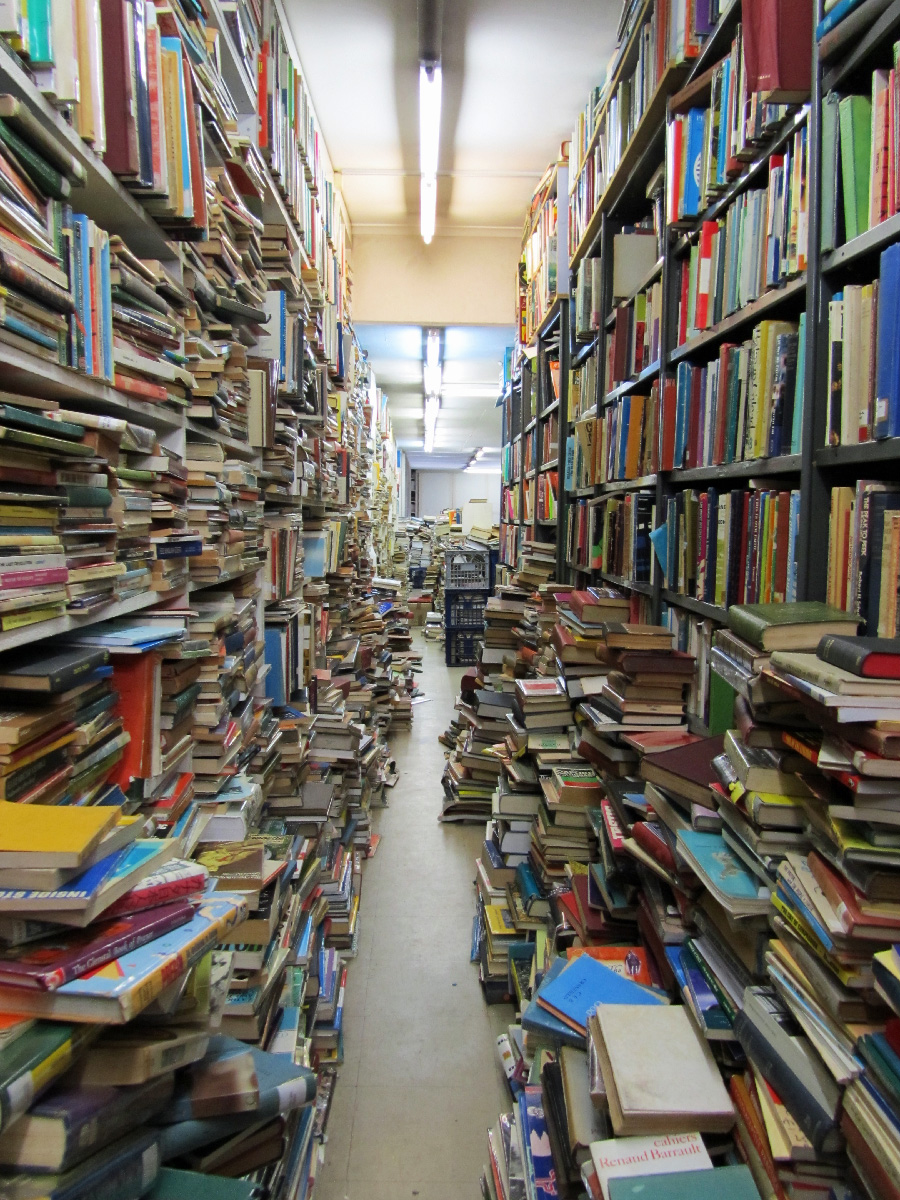
A typical aisle at Gould's Book Arcade, Newtown

As a bookseller, Gould was a Sydney 'character' who opened twelve bookshops and closed eleven since opening his first shop, the Third World Bookshop, in 1967. His bookshops were notable for being fertile hunting grounds of underground comics and posters as well as an eclectic range of books including leftist tracts. He also stocked (especially at his Leichhardt, New South Wales store), a large range of Betamax video cassettes for many years after the format was considered to be defunct.

Gould's shops pushed the boundaries of Australia's strict censorship laws at the time, and he was often raided by the NSW police vice squad. In 1969, Gould, then 32 and proprietor of the Third World Bookshop at Woollahra, was charged (along with Ronald James, 20, of Little Lonsdale St, Melbourne) with publishing obscene articles — posters of nineteenth century artist Aubrey Beardsley including Lysistrata and Cinesius Pursuing Myrhenia. The magistrate, Mr S.M. Lewer, characterised the illustrations as “lewd”, although the defence argued that such stylised nudity as found in the illustrations would not offend the 'average man' of the times. Gould was found guilty and fined.

He and his bookshop featured in the 1999 movie Erskineville Kings.

An article on Gould's business appeared in The Sydney Morning Herald just two months before his death.

== Death ==
Gould died on Sunday, 22 May 2011 from injuries sustained in a fall while sorting books at his store. He was 74. Over 500 people attended his funeral on 26 May 2011 at Macquarie Park, the service being extended by thirty minutes to provide for all of the eulogies.

Federal politicians Andrew Leigh and Daryl Melham paid tribute to Gould in the Australian parliament. New South Wales Opposition Leader John Robertson and government minister Brad Hazzard eulogised Gould in the Parliament of New South Wales.
