= Nation Review =

Former Australian Sunday newspaper

Nation Review was an Australian Sunday newspaper, which ceased publication in 1981. It was launched in 1972 after independent publisher Gordon Barton bought out Tom Fitzgerald's Nation publication and merged it with his own Sunday Review journal.

== Background ==
Nation Review featured contributors such as Michael Leunig, Bob Ellis, Germaine Greer, Phillip Adams, Richard Beckett a.k.a. Sam Orr, Mungo MacCallum, Francis James, Patrick Cook, Morris Lurie, John Hepworth, Frank Knopfelmacher and John Singleton.

The paper was self-styled "The Ferret", fancying itself as "lean and nosey".

Nation Review was aimed at Australia's new urban, educated middle class, providing mocking political commentary, offbeat cartoons, iconoclastic film, book, music and theatre reviews, and food, wine, chess, and even motoring columns. The paper's satirical tone matched the style of Australian university newspapers like Honi Soit and Tharunka, from which publications many of its contributors and editors had graduated.

Nation Review editorial policy was egalitarian and anti-establishment.

It was sufficiently self referencing at times with changes to style and cost. At times derivative broadsheets and offshoot publications like George Munster's response to the new Medibank in Medibunk appeared.

Its publication history was similar to another weekly newspaper The National Times.

Nation Review survived several mergers and name changes.
