= Nettie Palmer =

Australian poet, essayist and literary critic

- Palmer in 1943
- Born: Janet Gertrude Higgins; 18 August 1885; Bendigo, Victoria
- Died: 19 October 1964 (aged 79); Hawthorn, Victoria, Australia
- Spouse: Vance Palmer
- Children: Aileen, Helen
- Relatives: Esmonde Higgins (brother); H. B. Higgins (uncle); Ina Higgins (aunt)
- Writing career
- Language: English
- Period: 1914–1963

Janet Gertrude "Nettie" Palmer (née Higgins) (18 August 1885 – 19 October 1964) was an Australian poet, essayist and Australia's leading literary critic of her day. She corresponded with women writers and collated the Centenary Gift Book which gathered together writing by Victorian women.

== Early life ==
Nettie Higgins was born in Bendigo, Victoria, the niece of both H.B. Higgins, a leading Victorian radical political figure and later a federal minister and justice of the High Court of Australia, and of H.B. Higgins' sister, Ina Higgins, the first female landscape architect in Victoria. A brilliant scholar and linguist, Nettie was educated at the Presbyterian Ladies' College, Melbourne, the University of Melbourne and studied phonetics in Germany and France for the International Diploma of Phonetics. She was active in literary and socialist circles on her return to Melbourne and formed a deep and long term relationship with the visionary poet Bernard O'Dowd. While her brother Esmonde Higgins was a prominent early Australian Communist, Nettie never joined any political party: she was much more interested in broad social change.

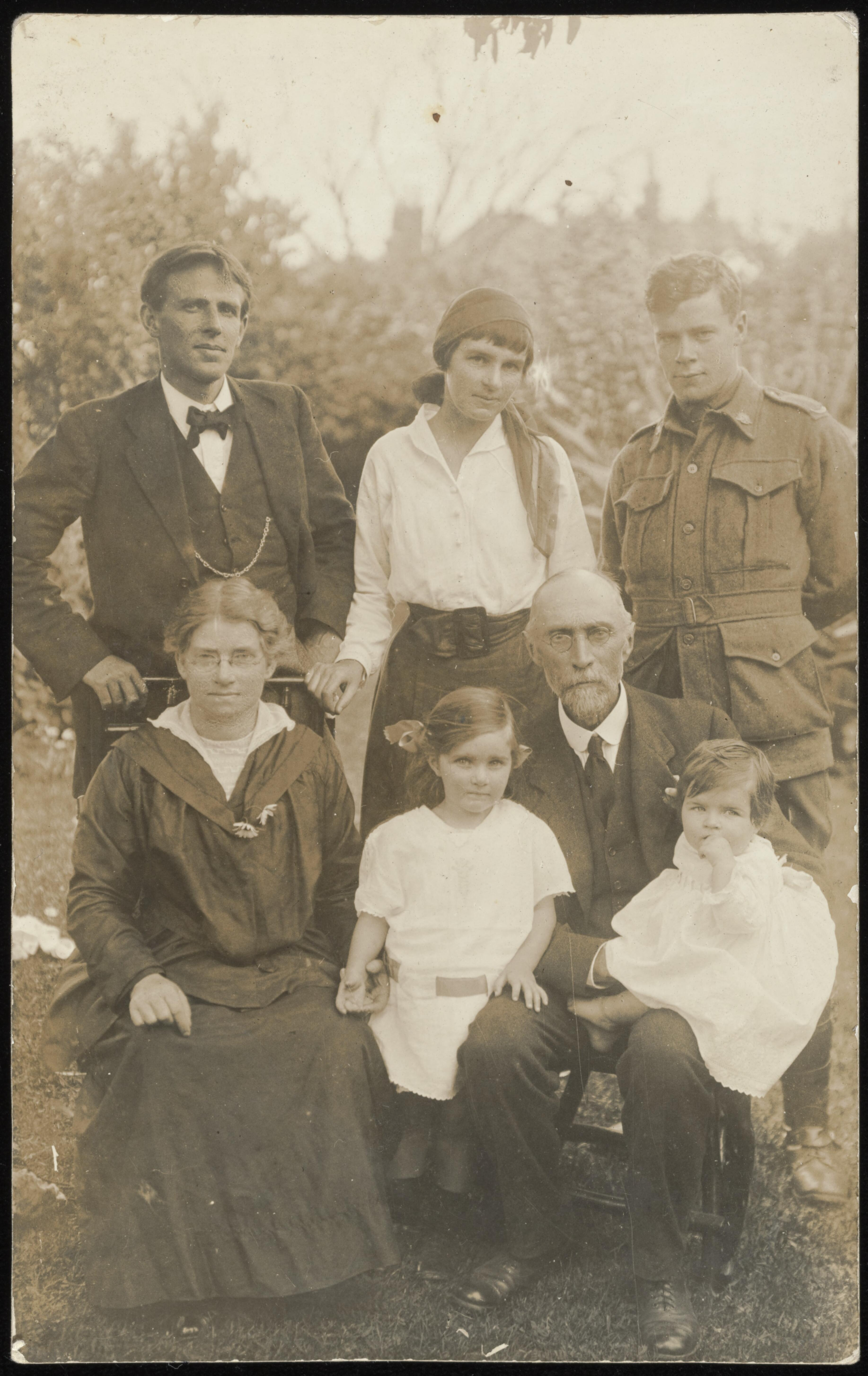
Palmer in 1918 (top row, middle) with her husband, brother Esmonde (in uniform), parents, and daughters Aileen and Helen

Higgins met Vance Palmer in the Public Library in Melbourne in 1909. Over the next few years, both spent time in Europe: Higgins studying for her diploma, Palmer establishing a career in journalism and writing in London. He was active in circles associated with early modernism and The New Age. They married in London in April 1914, intending to work there for a couple of years, but after the outbreak of World War I in August 1914, militarism dominated journalism. A daughter, Aileen, was born in London in April 1915. The Palmers returned to Melbourne later that year. Another daughter, Helen, was born in May 1917. Vance and Nettie campaigned against the Hughes government's attempt to introduce conscription into Australia. In 1918, Vance volunteered to join the Australian Army, but the war ended before he saw active service.

== Writing career ==
Both Vance and Nettie had begun to publish poetry, short stories, criticism and journalism before the war. Before her marriage Nettie taught modern languages and phonetics. In the 1920s, living in the seaside township of Caloundra, Queensland, Nettie, like Vance, could dedicate herself to literature and writing full-time.

In 1924 Nettie published Modern Australian Fiction, at that time the most important critical study of Australian literature. With her two daughters then attending school she returned to writing full-time. Writing regularly for numerous newspapers all round Australia, she wrote on a wide range of topics, from environment to cultural events, reviewing all important books being published in Australia, America, Europe and elsewhere. 1928 saw the publication of her short story selection, An Australian Story-Book, drawing on short stories which had only found form in ephemeral publications. In 1931 she published an important biography of her uncle, Henry Bournes Higgins: A Memoir. She edited an extraordinary collection of writings by Victorian women, both historical and literary for the centenary of Victoria, Centenary Gift Book. She also became the centre of a network of correspondence with many other writers, mainly women. She was an important confidante and mentor for such writers as Marjorie Barnard and Flora Eldershaw.

In 1935 the Palmers traveled to Europe, and they were holidaying near Barcelona when the Spanish Civil War broke out. Aileen and Helen had both joined the Communist Party as students, and Aileen stayed behind to volunteer for service with the British Medical Unit in Spain when the rest of the family returned to Australia. On their return to Melbourne Nettie devoted herself to supporting the Spanish Republic.

During World War II Vance and Nettie were strongly opposed to the advent of fascism, whether in Australia or overseas. Because they had witnessed the loss of democratic rights during the Great War their work was to strengthen the Australian belief in egalitarianism and human rights. They were also early advocates for the importance of regional environmental awareness and Nettie's book on the Dandenongs is an important early environmental history. Nettie published The Memoirs of Alice Henry (1944) and Fourteen Years: Extracts from a Private Journal (1948), often considered her best work.

Nettie published Henry Handel Richardson: a Study, which did a great deal to establish the reputation of now-acclaimed Melbourne author Henry Handel Richardson (the pen name of Ethel Florence Lindesay Richardson) and her monumental trilogy The Fortunes of Richard Mahony.

== Legacy ==
Vance and Nettie were remembered by those who knew them for their great compassion and generosity. They were instrumental in the recognition of Australian literature as a subject worthy of serious study and teaching in the academy. Nettie was active in the Goethe Institute in Melbourne.

== Last years and death ==
Vance and Nettie's last years were clouded by their own ill health and by worry about their daughter Aileen, who suffered a mental breakdown in 1948 and became an alcoholic. Aileen was an established poet in her own right and wrote extensively on the Spanish Civil War. Nettie died in 1964, universally mourned by Australian writers and readers.

== Palmer awards ==
The Victorian Premier's Literary Award for fiction is named the Vance Palmer Prize, while the prize for non-fiction is the Nettie Palmer Prize (until 2010 when under the stewardship of the Wheeler Centre they were renamed as Victorian Premier's Prizes). She was inducted onto the Victorian Honour Roll of Women in 2001. In 2018, Nettie was inducted into the Hall of Fame for the Melbourne Press Club in recognition of her elegant prose.

== Bibliography ==
=== Poetry collections ===
- The South Wind (1914)
- Shadowy Paths (1915)

=== Non-fiction ===
- Henry Bournes Higgins : A Memoir (1931)
- Talking It Over (1932)
- Memoirs of Alice Henry (1944) edited
- Fourteen Years : Extracts From a Private Journal 1925-1939 (1948)
- Henry Handel Richardson : A Study (1950)
- The Dandenongs (1952)
- Henry Lawson (1952)
- Bernard O'Dowd (1954) with Victor Kennedy
- Letters of Vance and Nettie Palmer 1915-1963 (1977) edited by Vivian Smith
- Nettie Palmer : Her Private Journal Fourteen Years, Poems, Reviews and Literary Essays (1988) edited by Vivian Smith
- Loving Words — Love Letters of Nettie and Vance Palmer 1909-1964 (2018) edited and selected by Deborah Jordan

=== Anthology edited ===
- An Australian Story-Book (1928)
- Centenary Gift Book (1934) edited with Frances Fraser
- Coast to Coast : Australian Stories 1949-50 (1950)
