= Tom Fitzgerald (economist) =

Australian economist

- Born: Thomas Michael Fitzgerald; 28 August 1918; Marrickville, New South Wales
- Died: 25 January 1993 (aged 74); Darlinghurst, New South Wales
- Occupations: economist, journalist, advisor
- Known for: Fitzgerald report

Thomas Michael Fitzgerald (28 August 1918 – 25 January 1993) was an Australian economist, journalist and political advisor.

== Education ==
Fitzgerald trained in economics by reading Keynes at the University of Sydney (1936–40).

== Career ==
Fitzgerald enlisted in the Royal Australian Air Force in November 1942 and, after training, was navigator on Liberator bombers in 1944–45.

Fitzgerald was financial editor of The Sydney Morning Herald from 1952 to 1970. While retaining his employment by Fairfax, he began publishing Nation, a fortnightly journal, in September 1958. Sylvia Lawson was one of his early contributors. He sold Nation to Gordon Barton in 1972 and was editorial director of Rupert Murdoch's News Limited from 1970 to 1972.

Fitzgerald produced the "Fitzgerald Report – The contribution of the mineral industry to Australian welfare : report to the Minister for Minerals and Energy" (1974) for the Whitlam government.

In 1990 Fitzgerald delivered a set of six Boyer Lectures "Between Life and Economics – 'A dissenting case'".

== Personal ==
Fitzgerald married in 1945, and had two sons and two daughters. He died in St Vincent's Hospital, Darlinghurst on 25 January 1993.
