= Ken Gott =

Australian journalist and activist (1922–1990)

Kenneth Davidson Gott
- Born: Kenneth Davidson Gott; 22 February 1922; Australia
- Died: 12 March 1990 (aged 68)
- Spouse: Beth Gott
- Writing career
- Language: English
- Notable work: Voices of hate

Kenneth Davidson Gott (22 February 1922 – 12 March 1990) was one of the leading left wing activists in Melbourne in the decades after World War Two. Along with Stephen Murray-Smith (1922–1988) he was a student leader and member of the university branch of the Communist Party of Australia in the 1940s.

== Career ==
Gott commenced studies at the University of Melbourne in 1941 joining the Melbourne University Regiment on 6 December, the day of the bombing of Pearl Harbor by the Japanese. He was given approval to return to his studies, and was later declared unfit for active service.

He subsequently worked in a number of unskilled jobs, and casual work at the Melbourne Herald newspaper, as well as research for trade unions. In 1950 he travelled overseas to Prague, to head the International Union of Students weekly news service.

Gott left Czechoslovakia, and was expelled from the Communist Party, disillusioned by the 1956 Russian invasion of Hungary and Khrushchev's revelations of Stalin's terror. However, he remained a political activist assisting the Communist Party press and undertaking research on behalf of the Australian Labor Party and took a significant role in subverting the Communist efforts to manipulate the 1959 ANZ Peace Congress. In Australia, he worked as a journalist for The West Australian and for the Sydney fortnightly newspaper Nation. He was a foundation staff member of The Australian newspaper, becoming features editor 1964–1965. He was a senior editor and research director for Business International, travelling to New York, and later Hong Kong and Bangkok and appointed Asian editor of Business Week, and then managing director of Business Asia. Returning to Australia he took a role as senior adviser and personal assistant to Sir Maurice Mawby of the mining company Rio Tinto. He was a prodigious writer and kept extensive papers, which have been acquired by the State Library of Victoria.

Other roles which Gott fulfilled at various times include:

- Tasmanian District delegate, Federal Executive, Australian Journalists' Association
- Australia-China Society Victorian Branch, 1953 committee member, 1956–1959 secretary
- manager, Wallaby Recordings
- managing director, shareholder and secretary, Pacific Merchandising Agency 1953–1954
- Australian Trade Research Service 1954–

== Personal life ==
Gott courted Beth Serpell (née Noye) after her first husband died during the war, reuniting and marrying her after she had completed a postgraduate scholarship in London. They had three children. Gott died in 1990.

== Publications ==
- Gott, K. D. (1965). Voices of hate : a study of the Australian League of Rights and its director, Eric D. Butler. Melbourne: Dissent.
