= Helen Palmer (publisher) =

Australian publisher

- Born: Helen Gwynneth Palmer; 9 May 1917; Kew, Victoria, Australia
- Died: 6 March 1979 (aged 61); North Sydney, New South Wales, Australia
- Occupations: Schoolteacher, publisher
- Website: adb.anu.edu.au/biography/palmer-helen-gwynneth-11333

Helen Gwynneth Palmer (9 May 1917 – 6 March 1979) was an Australian socialist publisher after the Khrushchev Secret Speech of 1956 and the USSR's invasion of Hungary of the same year, which caused many leftists to leave the Communist Party of Australia.

She was responsible for the financial and editorial publication of Outlook, a non-dogmatic magazine of Australian socialism. Palmer's significance is her cultivation of an inclusive and tolerant left intellectual network in Sydney and Australia more broadly, which contributed strongly to the emergence of the Australian new left of the late 1960s and early 1970s.

Palmer was additionally an author, educator, servicewoman, trade unionist and communist activist.

Contributors to Outlook included the writer Stephen Murray-Smith and the historian Ian Turner, who wrote an article, "The Long Goodbye" for the final issue. "How to review over 13 years, 82 issues, of Outlook?" his article began. "For 13 years, Outlook has been a significant element in the vanguard, standing on the ground of socialist humanism; is there anything that can take its place," he ended.

== Biography ==
Palmer was the daughter of Vance and Nettie Palmer, prominent Australian intellectuals. During her undergraduate career at university, Palmer was a newspaper editor. After military service during WWII in an education unit, Palmer took to secondary teaching. Facing difficulty after publishing on the People's Republic of China in 1953, Palmer eventually secured continuing if extremely tenuous casual employment in secondary education in Sydney.

A member of the Australian Communist Party, Palmer was expelled after her involvement in circulating the Secret Speech of Nikita Khrushchev, a cause for political expulsion within Australia, where some of the Communist Party leaders claimed the speech was a CIA forgery.

As a result of her expulsion, and of that of many of her immediate comrades, Palmer began publishing Outlook, which continued from 1957 to 1970, and was notable for its attention to indigenous issues: at that time particularly those of Australian Aborigines and Papuans in Australia's protectorate.

Denis Freney, in his autobiography, A Map of Days: Life on the Left, describes one of the meetings leading to the publication of Outlook after Bob Walshe, a Communist Party member and schoolteacher rang "and asked me to attend a meeting to discuss a new journal named Outlook, which he and another party member and high-school teacher, Helen Palmer, wanted to launch. I had met Helen a few times in Bob's historians' group. She was a daughter of the noted writers Vance and Nettie Palmer and a well-known author herself. We met in Helen's flat in North Sydney. Also present was Ken Gott, a party member from Melbourne who had taken many of the initiatives in distributing Khrushchev's speech. He had an unlimited supply from the US consulate. Jim Staples, whose flamboyant exploits as a student comrade were legendary, was also present. He was also distributing the speech without worrying about the consequences for his party membership. He seemed to enjoy the outrage his actions provoked among conservative party leaders. Others, mainly party academics or teachers, crowded Helen's living room."

Outlook, under Palmer's direction, published works by Trotskyist intellectuals, which would otherwise have not been available in Australia.

Prominent Vietnam antiwar activist and longtime Labor Party member Bob Gould recollects that Palmer was central to the creation of a milieu in Sydney that encouraged and intellectually supported the emergence of the anti-apartheid and antiwar protest movements.

== Published works ==
- 1949 Our Sugar, London; Melbourne: Longmans Green.
- 1954, Beneath the Southern Cross, Illustrated by Evelyn Walter, F. W. Cheshire.
- From the early 1950s until shortly before her death Palmer, with her friend Jessie MacLeod, wrote and published a set of innovative school textbooks on Australian History. These books emphasized 'the elements of the everyday lives of ordinary people'. Readable and informative, they appealed both to children and adults.

- 1954, with Jessie MacLeod, The First Hundred Years, illustrated by Harold Freedman, Melbourne: Longmans Green. ISBN 0582682576, ISBN 0582682576
- 1956, with Jessie MacLeod, Makers of The First Hundred Years, illustrated by Pamela Lindsay, Melbourne: Longmans Green.

- 1961, with Jessie MacLeod, After The First Hundred Years, illustrated by Mary Macqueen, Melbourne: Longmans Green.

- 1981, with Jessie MacLeod, The First Two Hundred Years, Melbourne: Longmans Green. ISBN 0582682576, ISBN 0582682576

- 1961 Fencing Australia, illustrated by Pamela Johnston, Melbourne: Longmans Green.
- 1964, with Jessie MacLeod, W. G. Spence and the Rise of the Trade Unions, illustrated by William Mahony, Melbourne: Longmans Green.
- 1966, 'Banjo' Paterson, Illustrated by A. Van Ewijk, Melbourne: Longmans Green.
- Helen Palmer's outlook, Posthumous essays by Helen Palmer, edited by Doreen Bridges for the Helen Palmer Memorial Committee; with an introduction by Robin Gollan. Sydney: Helen Palmer Memorial Committee. ISBN 095933520X, ISBN 0959335218

Palmer wrote The Ballad of 1891, which is widely regarded as a traditional song from the time of the 1891 Australian shearers' strike, but was in fact written in 1950–51 and set to music by Doreen Bridges (nee Jacobs). Palmer recounts this in an essay that appeared originally in Outlook.
