= Project cargo =

Transport related term

Project cargo is a term used to broadly describe the national or international transportation of large, heavy, high value or critical (to the project they are intended for) pieces of equipment. Also commonly referred to as Heavy lift.

== Description ==
This includes shipments made of various components which need disassembly for shipment and reassembly after delivery.

Project cargo is also a term used in the international insurance industry to describe DSU (Delay in Start Up) Marine Insurance, a specialized form of Marine cargo insurance.
