= Ina Higgins =

Australian horticulturalist

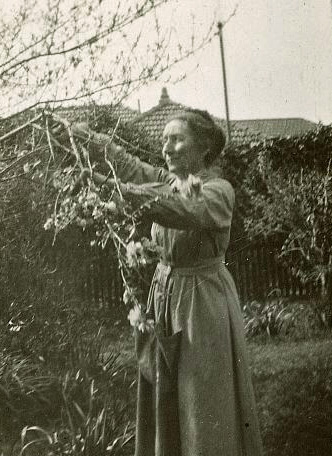
- Ina Higgins in garden at "Killenna" 1919
- Born: Frances Georgina Watts Higgins; September, 1860; County Cork, Ireland
- Died: 26 October 1948 (aged 88); Malvern, Victoria, Australia
- Education: Presbyterian Ladies' College, Melbourne; University of Melbourne
- Occupations: horticulturalist; landscape architect
- Movement: Women’s suffrage; Feminism

Frances Georgina Watts Higgins (September 1860 – 26 October 1948), usually known as Ina Higgins, was an Australian horticulturalist, landscape architect and feminist. She was the first female landscape architect in Victoria.

== Biography ==
=== Early life ===
Ina Higgins was the daughter of John and Anne (née Bournes) Higgins. She was born in County Cork, Ireland, in 1860. She arrived in Melbourne, from Ireland, on the ship Eurynome on 12 February 1870 with her mother and four siblings. Both Ina and her younger sister, Anna, attended the Presbyterian Ladies' College and the University of Melbourne. A brother, Henry Bournes Higgins, was a Justice of the High Court of Australia.

=== Career ===
In 1897, Charles Bogue Luffman, the director of Burnley Horticultural College in Melbourne, welcomed women into his institution as students, an event that had a profound effect on the subsequent development of landscape architecture. Higgins enrolled at Burnley in 1899 and later established herself as Victoria's first professional woman landscape gardener (there were no landscape architects until the 1960s in Australia), while maintaining a prominent role as a political activist. She assisted with the planting schemes for two new model towns in the Murrumbidgee district at the invitation of the New South Wales Commission of Irrigation, designed notable private gardens and was a vocal advocate for women's participation in the profession.

During the First World War, Higgins, now in her fifties, was active in her profession of landscape gardening and also in political activity. In 1914, she was invited by the New South Wales Government Commission of Irrigation, to assist with the planting plans for the two new townships in the Murrumbidgee irrigation districts of New South Wales. In 1915 when a co-operative women's farm, The Women's Rural Industries Co. Ltd., was started at Mordialloc, Higgins was involved. She was also a member of the Women's Political Association.

=== Activism ===
In 1891 a Victorian Women’s Suffrage Petition signed by approximately 30,000 women was presented to the Victorian parliament to urge the Government of the day to grant women the right to vote. Although that right was not won until 1908, the petition is an indication of the strength of the women's suffrage movement in Victoria. Higgins signed the petition and, from 1894, was the honorary secretary of the United Council for Woman Suffrage and sat on its executive committee from 1900.

=== Death ===
From 1890 Higgins lived at the family home, "Killenna," Malvern. She never married and continued to live there until the time of her death on 26 October 1948.
