= Gordon Barton =

Australian businessman and political activist

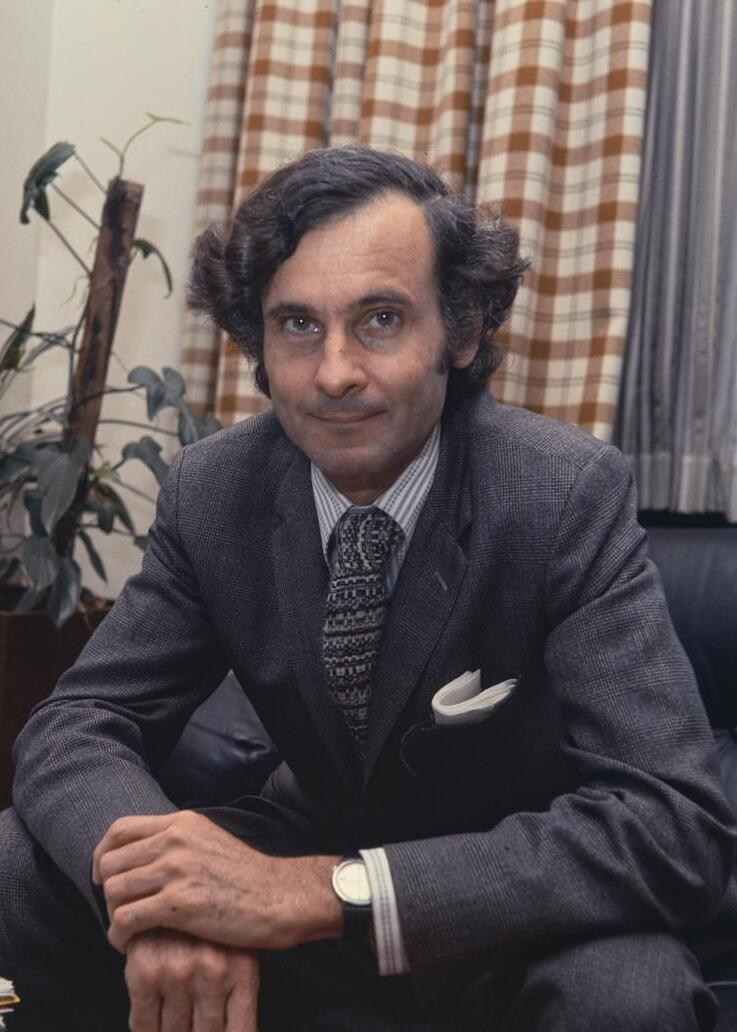
- Barton in 1974
- Born: 30 August 1929; Surabaya, Java
- Died: 4 April 2005 (aged 75); Spain
- Education: University of Sydney
- Occupations: Corporate raider, investor
- Spouse: Yvonne Hand
- Children: 2

Gordon Page Barton (30 August 1929 – 4 April 2005) was an Australian businessman and political activist.

== Biography ==
Barton was born in Surabaya, Java, Dutch East Indies (now Indonesia) of a Dutch mother and Australian father. He showed his intelligence and originality early, at the University of Sydney, where he found by careful study of the handbook of course requirements he could select a particular group of subjects that would qualify him for three degrees simultaneously, in the time normally taken for one. The university awarded him the degrees but then changed the rules so that it couldn't happen again.

While still at university Barton started Interstate Parcel Express Company (IPEC), which was the core of his business. In 1966, he used some of his wealth to form the Liberal Reform Group, a splinter group of members of the Liberal Party of Australia disenchanted with their party's support for the Vietnam War; this became the Australian Reform Movement and then the Australia Party, one of the precursors of the Australian Democrats.

In 1967, he formed the company Tjuringa Securities which was the pioneer Australian corporate raider. Tjuringa took over Federal Hotels (which built the Hobart Casino, the first legal casino in Australia) and the Angus and Robertson bookshops and publishing business which were asset stripped.

He also set up two newspapers, the Sunday Observer and the Sunday Review. (The Sunday Observer owned by Barton in the 1960s was short-lived and was unrelated to The Observer, UK.) The second was merged with the purchased Nation publication to form the Nation Review.

Barton was married to Yvonne Hand, who died in 1970. They had two children, Cindie and Geoffrey. Barton then lived in a de facto relationship with Mary Ellen Ayrton from 1977. Until their separation and estrangement, their blended family included Barton's two children and Ayrton's daughter Kate.

He died in Spain in 2005, aged 75.
