= List of people from Ballarat =

This is a list of people from Ballarat. Those included are notable past or present inhabitants originating from, or associated with, the Australian regional city of Ballarat, Victoria.

== A ==
- Leslie "Bull" Allen, soldier, recipient of the United States' Silver Star
- Georgia Amoore, basketball player
- Reg Ansett, businessman and founder of Ansett Transport Industries

== B ==
- Henry Bailey, Victorian Minister of Lands and Water Supply 1924–1932; born and educated in Ballarat
- Robert Bath, Ballarat's first Olympian, competed in boxing
- Geoffrey Blainey, former professor at the University of Melbourne; former chair in Australian studies at Harvard University
- Sir Henry Bolte, 38th premier of Victoria
- Ray Borner, Australian Boomers basketball player and four-time Olympian
- Steve Bracks, premier of Victoria
- John Button, Federal Labor politician

== C ==
- Raffaello Carboni, author of an eyewitness account of the uprising at the Eureka Stockade
- Marie Collier, operatic soprano
- F. W. Commons, monumental mason
- Susan Crennan, former justice of the High Court of Australia
- Thomas Curnow, schoolteacher who prevented Ned Kelly's gang from derailing a police train

== D ==
- Henry Daglish, premier of Western Australia
- Jacqueline Dark, opera singer
- David Davies, artist
- Kimberley Davies, actress
- Bob Davis, Geelong Football Club champion
- Alfred Deakin, inaugural Federal member of Parliament for Ballarat; second prime minister of Australia
- Roger Donaldson, film producer, director, writer
- William Dunstan, Australian recipient of the Victoria Cross
- Will Dyson, illustrator and political cartoonist

== E ==
- Harold Elliott, major general of the Australian army (educated in Ballarat)
- Warren Ellis, musician, composer, member of Dirty Three, Nick Cave and The Bad Seeds, Grinderman; composed music for several movies, including The Proposition and The Assassination of Jesse James by the Coward Robert Ford
- Harriet Elphinstone-Dick, who along with her partner Alice Moon, taught gymnastics to women and girls in Ballarat
- Edward de Lacy Evans, Bendigo-based trans man, married his third wife Julia Mary Marquan in St Andrew's Presbyterian in Ballarat

== F ==
- Frank Fenner, virologist
- David Fleay, naturalist, first breeder of the platypus

== G ==
- Duncan Gillies, 14th premier of Victoria

== H ==
- Clarice Halligan, nurse, and prisoner of war
- Lesbia Harford, bisexual poet, was educated in Ballarat
- Eileen Healy, Sister of Mercy
- Gertrude Healy, violinist, teacher, conductor
- David Hirschfelder, film score composer, performer
- David Hobson, opera singer
- Thomas Hollway, 36th premier of Victoria
- Keith Holman, rugby league player and coach
- Craig Revel Horwood, Australian-British dancer, choreographer, and theatre director in the United Kingdom; judge on Strictly Come Dancing
- Bill Hunter, actor
- Bridget Hustwaite (born 1991), radio and television presenter, journalist and Endometriosis Australia ambassador

== I ==
- Bryce Ives, theatre maker, commentator, media producer, former Ballarat Young Person of the Year, director of the Federation University Arts Academy and Gippsland Centre of Art & Design

== J ==
- William G. James, the ABC's first director of music

== L ==
- Peter Lalor, leader of the Eureka Rebellion (1854); colonial Parliamentarian; author of The Story of the Eureka Stockade
- Frank Little, Catholic archbishop of Melbourne
- Tony Lockett, Australian Football League footballer, Brownlow Medallist and holder of the all-time goalkicking record.
- Ted Lovett, Australian rules footballer
- Arthur Alfred Lynch (1861–1934), son of John Lynch; engineer and journalist; a Boer colonel in the Boer War who fought with the Boers (1899–1900); sentenced to death for treason against the British in 1903, pardoned in 1907; elected in House of Commons in absentia by Irish in 1901 and 1909–1918; later became a medical doctor

== M ==
- Robyn Maher, basketball player
- Michael Malthouse, former coach of Collingwood Football Club, Footscray Football Club and West Coast Football Club (AFL Premiership coach in 1992, 1994 and 2010)
- Russell Mark, Olympic shooting gold medallist
- Norm McLeod, footballer for Melbourne Football Club, 1897-1898
- Sir Douglas Menzies, justice of the High Court of Australia
- Sir Robert Menzies, prime minister of Australia
- Steve Moneghetti, Olympic marathon runner
- Elsie Morison, opera singer
- Leslie Morshead, general in the Australian Army; Morshead Park is named after him

== N ==
- Hilda Rix Nicholas, painter
- David Noonan, artist; lives and works in London
- Benjamin Northey, chief conductor of the Christchurch Symphony Orchestra

== O ==
- Alfred Arthur O'Connor, miner and politician
- Adela Dora Ohlfsen-Bagge, artist, was born and raised in Ballarat

== P ==
- Aileen Palmer, the British Australian diarist and poet, lived her last years in a psychiatric facility in Ballarat and was buried in the Ballarat cemetery
- Michelle Payne, 2015 Melbourne Cup winner
- Cardinal George Pell, Catholic archbishop emeritus of Sydney
- Drew Petrie, professional Australian rules footballer
- Ethel May (Monte) Punshon, artist, teacher, recipient of the Japanese Order of the Sacred Tresure and lesbian was born and educated in Ballarat.

== R ==
- Rosina Raisbeck, opera singer
- Shayne Reese, Olympic swimmer
- Gwen Richardson, travel writer
- Sir Macpherson Robertson, founder of confectionery company MacRobertson's (Freddo, Old Gold, Cherry Ripe)
- Alfred Ronalds, fly fishing author and artisan

== S ==
- Andrew George Scott, also known as Captain Moonlite, was held and escaped from the Ballarat Gaol.
- Matthew Short, cricketer
- Nathan Spielvogel, author
- Cyril Staples, cricketer
- Henry Sutton, inventor

== T ==
- Jared Tallent, Olympian race walker
- Luke Tonkin, actor

== V ==
- James Valentine, journalist

== W ==
- Hugh D.T. Williamson (1901–1985), banking executive and philanthropist
- Paul Wiltshire, record producer, songwriter and entrepreneur

== Y ==
- Ellen Young (1810–1872), poet

== See also ==
- List of people from Adelaide
- List of people from Brisbane
- List of people from Darwin
- List of people from Frankston
- List of people from Fremantle
- List of people from Melbourne
- List of people from Rockhampton
- List of residents of Sydney
- List of people from Toowoomba
- List of people from Wagga Wagga
- List of people from Wollongong
