= Clarkesdale Bird Sanctuary =

Coordinates: 37°42′35″S 143°36′40″E

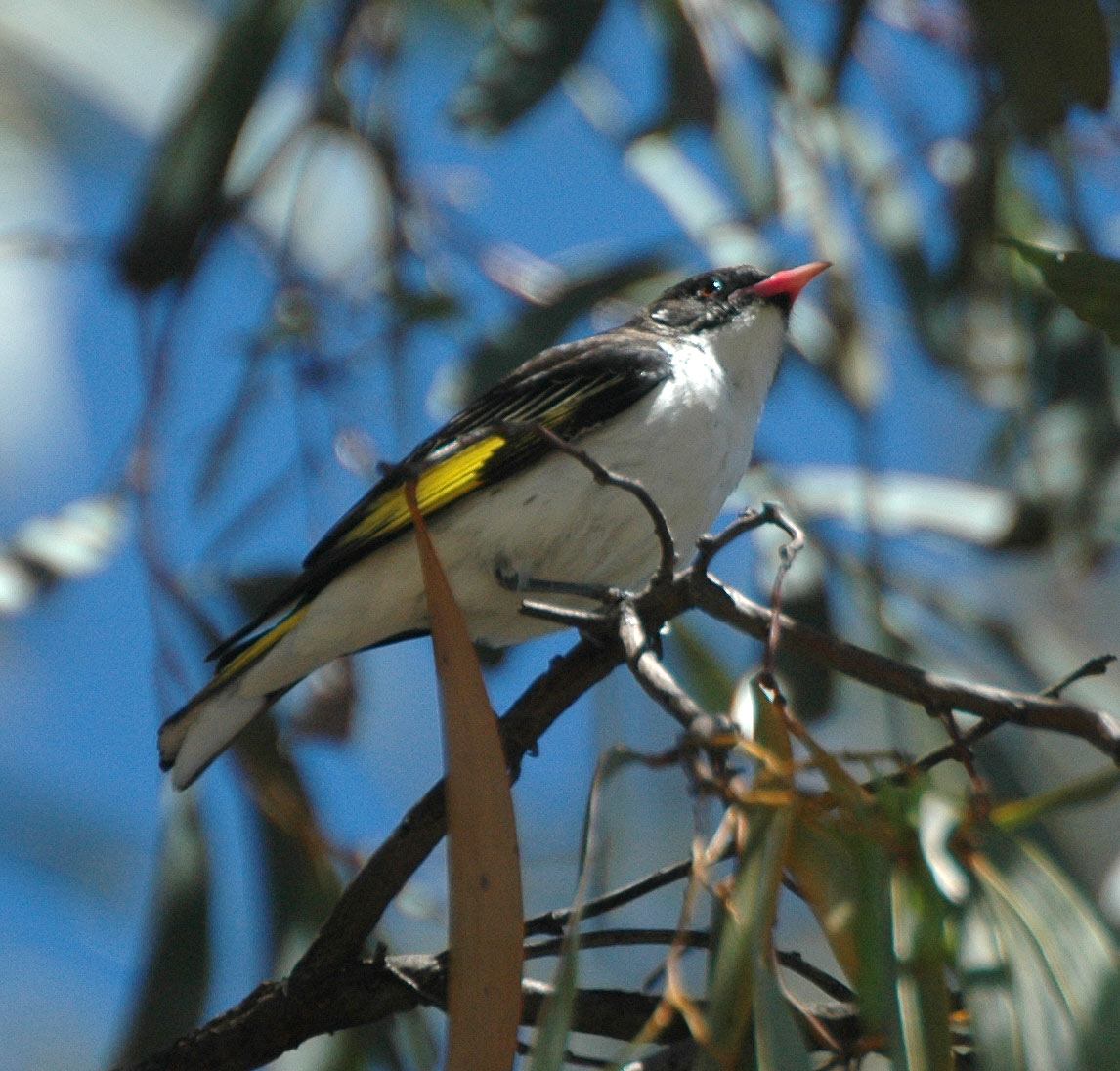
The painted honeyeater is an occasional visitor to Clarkesdale

The Clarkesdale Bird Sanctuary is a nature reserve focused on protecting and restoring habitat for woodland birds. It lies in the state of Victoria in south-eastern Australia, near the small town of Linton, 30 km south-west of the city of Ballarat.

== History ==
The origins of the reserve lie in the 1960s with the efforts of Gordon Clarke, a sheep farmer in the Linton district who was a keen birdwatcher and conservationist. He began removing areas of gorse, an invasive weed in the area, to replant one of his paddocks with a wide range of Australian native (though not necessarily locally indigenous) plants to attract and protect birds by providing them with food and shelter. This initial 31-hectare (77-acre) block of land, named the "Bird Paddock’’, had been purchased in 1957 and had never been heavily grazed; it was donated by Clarke to Bird Observation & Conservation Australia (BOCA), then known as the Bird Observers Club, in 1975 when formal reservation of the land took place.

In 1980 a second block of 13 hectares (32 acres) of land, named "Grantiella’’ after the generic name of the painted honeyeater, was also donated to the club. During the 1980s Clarke purchased several additional small blocks of adjacent land which he donated to the Trust for Nature to supplement the existing reserve. Clarke died in 1996 at the age of 89, having established and endowed the Gordon Clarke Trust Fund to secure the future of the sanctuary.

== Description ==
With adjacent crown land dedicated as a flora and fauna reserve, the sanctuary comprises 535 hectares (1,320 acres), of which the private land titles are covered by conservation covenants. Much of the land used to be farmland, including a commercial orchard and a pine plantation as well as pasture for sheep. but is now subject to a program of environmental rehabilitation involving the restoration of indigenous woodland vegetation. There are some small artificial wetlands on the reserve, which is managed by a BOCA-appointed Committee of Management and a resident ranger. Much maintenance and planting work is carried out by a volunteer group, the Friends of Clarkesdale.

=== Vegetation ===
The remnant native forest in the area is classified as heathy dry forest and has been subject to selective logging and other forms of disturbance for many years. The dominant trees include messmate, candlebark, red stringybark, narrow-leaved peppermint, broad-leaved peppermint, scent–bark and swamp gum forming an open overstorey about 20 m in height. The understorey is a low and sparse shrub layer containing myrtle wattle, black wattle, golden bush-pea, drooping cassinia, heath tea-tree, common heath, small grass-tree, austral bracken and grey tussock-grass.

== Aims and achievements ==
The original aim of Gordon Clarke was to provide a habitat for birds that was richer in food resources than native forest, and towards that end most of his early plantings were of nectar-producing shrubs and trees, especially from Western Australia. He refused to plant the local stringybarks and scent-barks as they did not fit within that vision. This has resulted in areas of Clarke's plantings benefiting some species of honeyeaters, such as New Holland honeyeaters and red wattlebirds, to the point where they are much more common there than in native forest. On the other hand, birds such as treecreepers have benefited far less and are more common in adjacent native forest.

The current vision for the sanctuary however, as stated in the 1999 management plan, is ‘to optimise, manage and create habitat at Linton as a Sanctuary to increase the diversity and populations of native birds in perpetuity’. The main aim of the management program is to help reverse the decline of the woodland bird community, which is listed as a threatened community under Victoria's Flora and Fauna Guarantee Act 1988. Clarkesdale was a finalist in Category 6 (Protecting Bush, Land and Waterways) of the 2003 Banksia Awards.
