= F. W. Commons =

Australian sculptor

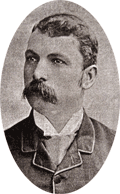
- F. W. Commons in Ballarat, 1894
- Born: Frederick William Commons; 1860; Linton, Victoria, Australia
- Died: 3 April 1925 (age 65); Ballarat, Victoria, Australia
- Occupations: Monumental mason, sculptor
- Spouse: Emily Ada Williams
- Children: See list: Emily Jane Frederick William Jr Robert Hannaford Richard Mario Brali Olga Pearl Henrietta May Rhoda Eleanor Gertrude
- Parents: Richard Commons (father); Elizabeth Jane Barkla (mother)

Frederick William Commons (1860-1925) was an Australian monumental sculptor who was commissioned to carve the monuments in the Ballarat Town Hall. He was commissioned to carve four allegorical figures for Parliament House, Melbourne, each 12 ft high and for £2,100. However, it never eventuated due to the depression. Today, many of his works can be seen in statues and monuments in the Ballarat district.

== Early life and education ==
Commons was born in Linton, Victoria in 1860, to Cornish parents Richard Commons and Elizabeth Barkla. He was described as the "first white child born in the township".

Commons was educated at the school of Ebenezer Parker MA in Scarsdale. When he was 16 he travelled to England to begin technical training in masonry. His parents, three brothers and three sisters accompanied him on the Northumberland bound for London. He returned to Australia at the age of 18 on the Somersetshire in February 1879.

== Career ==
He founded F. W. Commons Monuments in 1875, on the corner of Webster Street and Creswick Road in Ballarat, on the site of an old butter factory. The company had erected over 35,000 monuments by Commons' death.

In 1884, Commons married Australian woman Emily Ada Williams. They had nine children. Commons was Honorary secretary of the Ballarat Chamber of Commerce, Captain of the Ballarat Rowing Club, Captain of the Rifle Club, and Worshipful Master of the Freemasons Orion Lodge. During the Great War, F. W. Commons landed a plane with floats on Lake Wendouree.

Frederick William Commons died in 1925 and was buried in the Ballaarat New Cemetery. The company was continued on by his son, Richard Mario Commons, upon his death.

== Work ==
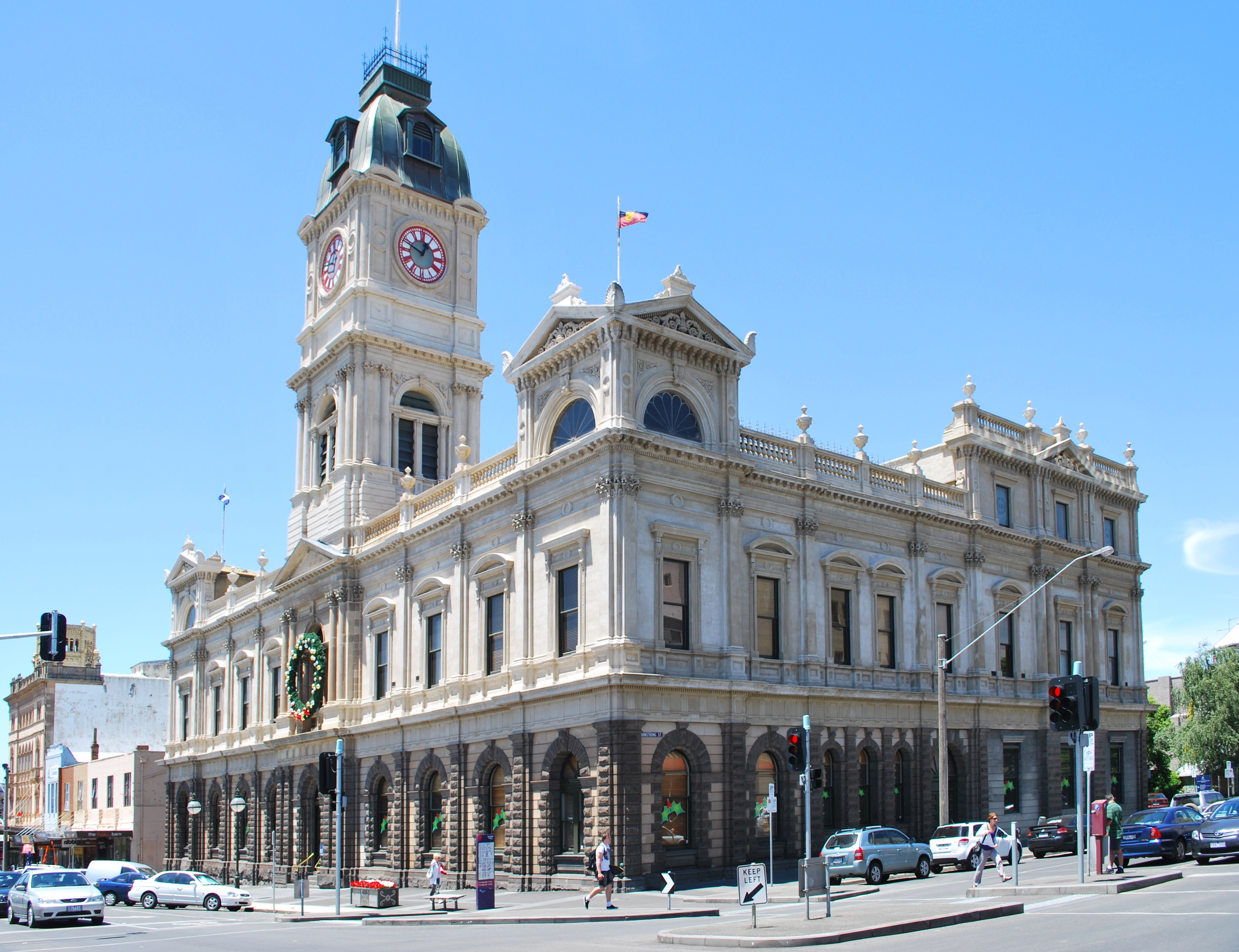
The Ballarat Town Hall

Commons was "awarded first order of merit for art sculpture. Premiumed for sculpture by Victorian Government. Awarded first and second Premiums in open competition for sculpture for the decoration of Parliament House, Melbourne". Many of his memorials and monuments were exported to customers in America.

Many memorials in public buildings, such as the Ballarat Town Hall, and hundreds of headstones in district cemeteries bear the inscription F. W. Commons. He commissioned the Queen Victoria Memorial Fountain in the Sturt Street Gardens, the Snake Valley District War Memorial, and a devotional sculpture at the Convent of Mercy, Ballarat East (Sacred Heart College).
