= James Esmond =

Irish-Australian gold prospector and miner

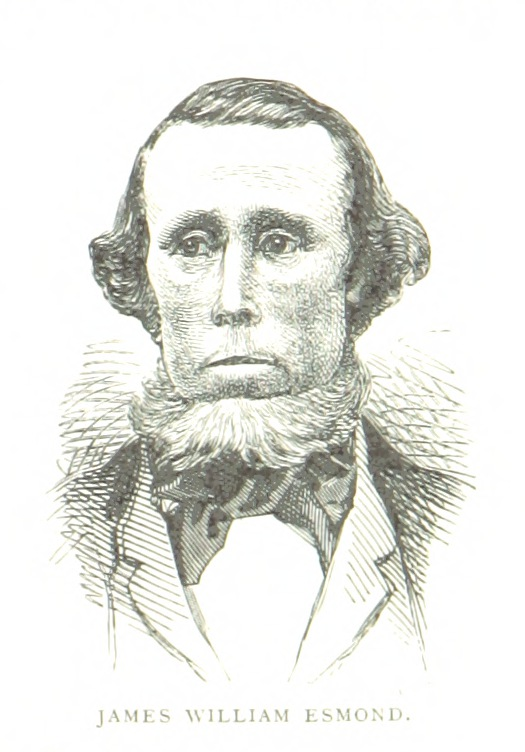
- An 1888 illustration of Esmond
- Born: James William Esmond; 11 April 1822; Enniscorthy, County Wexford, Ireland
- Died: 3 December 1890 (aged 68); Australia
- Burial place: Ballaarat New Cemetery
- Occupations: gold prospector, miner
- Known for: one of the first people to discover gold in Australia
- Spouse: Margaret
- Children: three sons, six daughters

James William Esmond (11 April 1822 – 3 December 1890) was an Irish-Australian gold prospector and miner, and was one of the first people to discover gold in Australia.

== Early life ==
Esmond was born in Enniscorthy, a town in County Wexford in the south-east of Ireland, in 1822, the son of a merchant. Migrating to the Port Phillip District (later the colony of Victoria) in 1840, Esmond worked a number of jobs, including working on stations in the Western Port region, and driving the mail coach from Buninyong to the region around Horsham, a major town in the Wimmera.

== Prospecting ==
In 1849, having heard news of the California gold rush, Esmond sailed for California to try his luck. Arriving too late to be successful as a prospector, Esmond took work as a supervisor on the diggings, before returning to Sydney, New South Wales in 1850. Esmond travelled on the same ship as Edward Hargraves, the man credited with first discovering gold in New South Wales. Esmond returned to Buninyong, and took work as a contractor digging post holes. There he met Dr George Hermann Bruhn, a German doctor and geologist who was returning from Clunes. Bruhn told Esmond that in Clunes he had met with the pastoralist Donald Cameron; gold had been found on Cameron's property in March 1850, and Bruhn told Esmond of quartz reefs there which were likely to bear gold.

Esmond set out for Clunes, with his colleague James Pugh. Having investigated the area, they concluded that there was gold there, and so they hired two sawyers, known as Burns and Kelly, to work the site. Having recovered several ounces of gold from the site, Esmond travelled to Geelong on 5 July 1851 and showed the gold to Geelong Advertiser journalist Alfred Clarke. When questioned by Clarke about the location the gold came from, Esmond was vague; but once he returned from Melbourne on 15 July 1851, having purchased materials to make a cradle, he told Clarke that the gold had come from Clunes. News of the find was broken in the Melbourne newspapers on 16 July, and by Clarke in the Advertiser on 22 July 1851. Esmond sent the first saleable gold produced in Victoria – fourteen ounces – to Clarke on 22 Augustc1851, which was later sold in Melbourne.

Esmond later claimed that he first found gold on 28 June 1851. Mining engineer and amateur historian Peter McCarthy has suggested that Esmond had "set up as a prospector in the Pyrenees on his return and kept himself fed somehow, without officially stealing the Queen's gold, for several months." On 22 May 1851 the Government of New South Wales had issued regulations under crown lands legislation to control gold mining, impose mining licences and collect licence fees. Meanwhile, Victoria was to become a separate colony from New South Wales on 1 July 1851, and the Government of Victoria – which had very few police or military forces at its disposal – would be responsible gold mining from then on. McCarthy suggests that Esmond nominated 28 June 1851 (or 29 June 1851 in some sources) as the date of discovery because, accounting for the travel times between Clunes and Melbourne, his claim would reach the authorities there on 1 July 1851, when he would be free from New South Wales' strict licensing scheme.

In 1853 and 1854, the Legislative Council of Victoria established the first of several Select Committees to consider rewards for the discovery of goldfields. The committee considered Esmond's claim of discovery, and accepted that he found gold on 28 June 1851 and that the site was revealed on 22 July. However, the committee also considered the claim of Louis Michel, who had discovered gold at Anderson's Creek, in the town of Warrandyte; the committee determined that Michel had both discovered gold and reported the discovery on 5 July 1851, the same day that Esmond showed the Clunes gold to Alfred Clarke in Geelong. Ultimately, the committee found that Michel was the first to discover and publicise a goldfield, but that Esmond was the first actual producer of gold, and both were granted rewards of £1000.

Esmond continued to be involved in gold mining, eventually moving to the goldfields at Ballarat, where he became politically prominent among the miners' organisations, ultimately commanding a section of miners in the Eureka Stockade. In 1865, Esmond started a gold mining company conducting deep shaft mining in the area north of Clunes. Despite his efforts, the company was unsuccessful, and he ultimately sold it.

== Later life ==
Esmond suffered from Bright's disease later in life, and struggled with financial problems; the mining community sought government aid for him, though none was forthcoming, but public donations had raised £150 for his family by the time of his death. Esmond died on 3 December 1890 and was buried in the Ballaarat New Cemetery, 36 years to the day after the Eureka Stockade. Historian William Bramwell Withers, in his obituary of Esmond on 5 December 1890, wrote that he walked to the top of a hill overlooking Ballarat and saw a shining white shaft of granite marking the spot where the Stockade took place, a monument erected six years earlier to mark but not commemorate those who had died there. Withers' respectful tribute to Esmond, one of a number of Eureka diggers who had recently died, was unusual at the time, when the Stockade was still regarded by many as a disloyal rebellion.

Esmond was survived by his wife Margaret, their three sons and six daughters.

== See also ==
- Victorian gold rush
