= Happy Valley (Golden Plains Shire) =

- Town
- Coordinates: 37°43′12″S 143°36′20″E
- Country: Australia
- State: Victoria
- LGA: Golden Plains Shire

Government
  - State electorates: Eureka; Ripon
  - Federal division: Ballarat

Population
  - Total: 87 (SAL 2021)
- Postcode: 3360
Localities around Happy Valley
Linton	Snake Valley	Scarsdale
Skipton	Happy Valley	Piggoreet
Mannibadar	Cape Clear	Springdallah

Happy Valley is a locality in Victoria, Australia, in the Local Government Area of the Golden Plains Shire.

== History ==
Gold was discovered in the area, originally called "Wardy Yallock" (thought to have meant "winding yellow river" of Aboriginal origins) in 1849 as part of the Australian gold rushes, with intensive mining beginning in 1853. The Aboriginal name is also given as Molong ghip. Mining Continued until the 1900s. The naming comes from the amount of gold found in the area.

== Demographics ==
Year	Population
1871	512
1891	239
1911	135
1933	69
1954	25
2016	85
