= Eileen Healy =

Australian Sister of Mercy and school principal

Mother Bonaventure

Personal life
- Born: Eileen Mary Healy; September 22, 1888 Ballarat, Victoria, Australia
- Died: 26 May 1966 (aged 77) Ballarat, Victoria, Australia
- Resting place: Ballarat New Cemetery
- Home town: Ballarat
- Parents: Michael John Healy (father); Mary Helena Healy (née Costello) (mother)
- Education: University of Melbourne
- Occupation: Catholic religious sister; school principal

Religious life
- Religion: Roman Catholic
- Order: Sisters of Mercy

Eileen Healy (22 September 1888 – 26 May 1966) was an Australian Sister of Mercy, better known as Mother Bonaventure. Her roles as school principal at Sacred Heart College and as an educationalist at the Aquinas Training College for Teachers in Ballarat, resulted in her contributing to the training of hundreds of future Australian teachers. She also managed multiple building projects throughout her career, contributing greatly to the educational landscape of regional Victoria. Building projects included the construction of hostels, convents, primary and secondary school buildings and facilities, both in Ballarat and other country towns in Victoria. Her desire to contribute to the social needs of Ballarat saw her also inaugurate the Mercy Home Care and Nursing Service.

== Early life and education ==
Eileen Mary Healy was born on 22 September 1888 in Ballarat East, Victoria. She was the second of five children to parents Mary Helena Healy (née Costello), a teacher, and her husband Michael John Healy, who was a railwayman.

Healy's early education was at St Alipius Primary School and then at the Sacred Heart College, Ballarat. Sacred Heart College was founded by the Sisters of Mercy in 1881 and closed in 1994, when it amalgamated with several other schools in the area to form Damascus College Ballarat. Healy went on to complete a Diploma in Music in 1909 and a Diploma of Education in 1916 at the University of Melbourne.

== Religious life and career ==
Healy became a novice with the Sisters of Mercy in Ballarat in 1908 when she was 20 years of age. She was professed three years later taking the religious name of Sister Bonaventure (later Mother Bonaventure). Sister Bonaventure worked under fellow educationalist Mother Mother Xavier Flood. Flood was the first principal of Sacred Heart College and also the founder of what became the Aquinas Training College for Teachers in Ballarat. Sister Bonaventure assisted Flood in this pioneering work in teacher education and in 1928 she was appointed assistant superior. Between 1951 and 1966 Sister Bonaventure was the mistress of method. In this role she had responsibility for preparing hundreds of religious sisters and other trainees for future teaching roles.

From 1952 to 1966 Healy was also the principal at Sacred Heart College. In 1956 she became Mother-General of the order and in 1963 she became a member of the Australian College of Education. Mother Bonaventure was a foundation member of the Australian Federation of the Sisters of Mercy in 1957, which was an association of seventeen individual congregations that had previously operated autonomously. This federation existed until 1981 when it became the Institute of Sisters of Mercy of Australia.

Mother Bonaventure was known for taking charge of many building projects throughout her career. This included building a hostel for undergraduates at the Aquinas Training College for Teachers (Patrician House), the construction of multiple buildings and expanded sporting facilities at Sacred Heart College, four primary schools in Ballarat, convents and schools in thirteen Victorian regional towns, and a senior secondary college at St Martin's in the Pines, Mount Clear, along with plans for a day and boarding school on the same site.

== Death and legacy ==
Mother Bonaventure died on 26 May 1966 at the Sacred Heart Convent in Ballarat East. She was buried in the Roman Catholic section of the Ballarat New Cemetery.

The Healy name was given to one of the school houses at Sacred Heart College in her honour.

== See also ==
- Education in Ballarat
- Sisters of Mercy
