= Cape Clear, Victoria =

Cape Clear
- Town
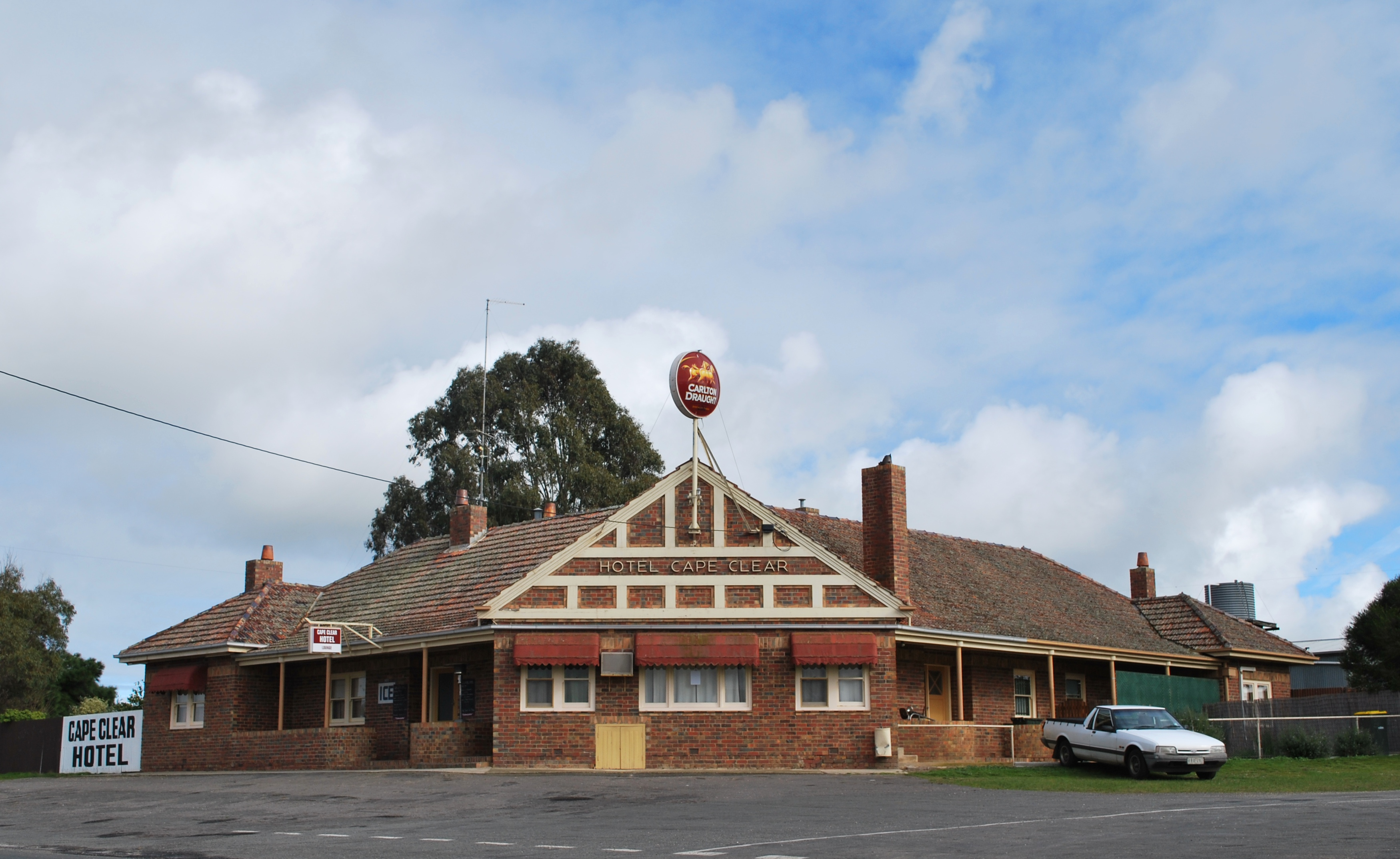
- Cape Clear Hotel, 2010

- Coordinates: 37°47′0″S 143°37′0″E
- Country: Australia
- State: Victoria
- LGA: Golden Plains Shire
- Location: 154 km (96 mi) W of Melbourne; 37 km (23 mi) SW of Ballarat

Government
  - State electorate: Eureka
  - Federal division: Ballarat

Population
  - Total: 148 (SAL 2021)
- Postcode: 3351
Localities around Cape Clear
Mannibadar	Happy Valley	Springdallah
Mannibadar	Cape Clear	Berringa
Pitfield	Pitfield	Illabarook

Cape Clear is a small town located in Victoria, Australia, adjacent to the Woady Yaloak River. The area was vibrant during the Victorian gold rush during the mid-19th century with the population swelling from fewer than 1000 to 25,000 at the height of the gold rush.

Cape Clear was named by Irish gold miners from Cape Clear in Ireland. Despite its name, it is about 100 kilometres from the coast. A 13-metre-high model lighthouse, with a working light, was constructed near the hotel in 2008 to create a local landmark.

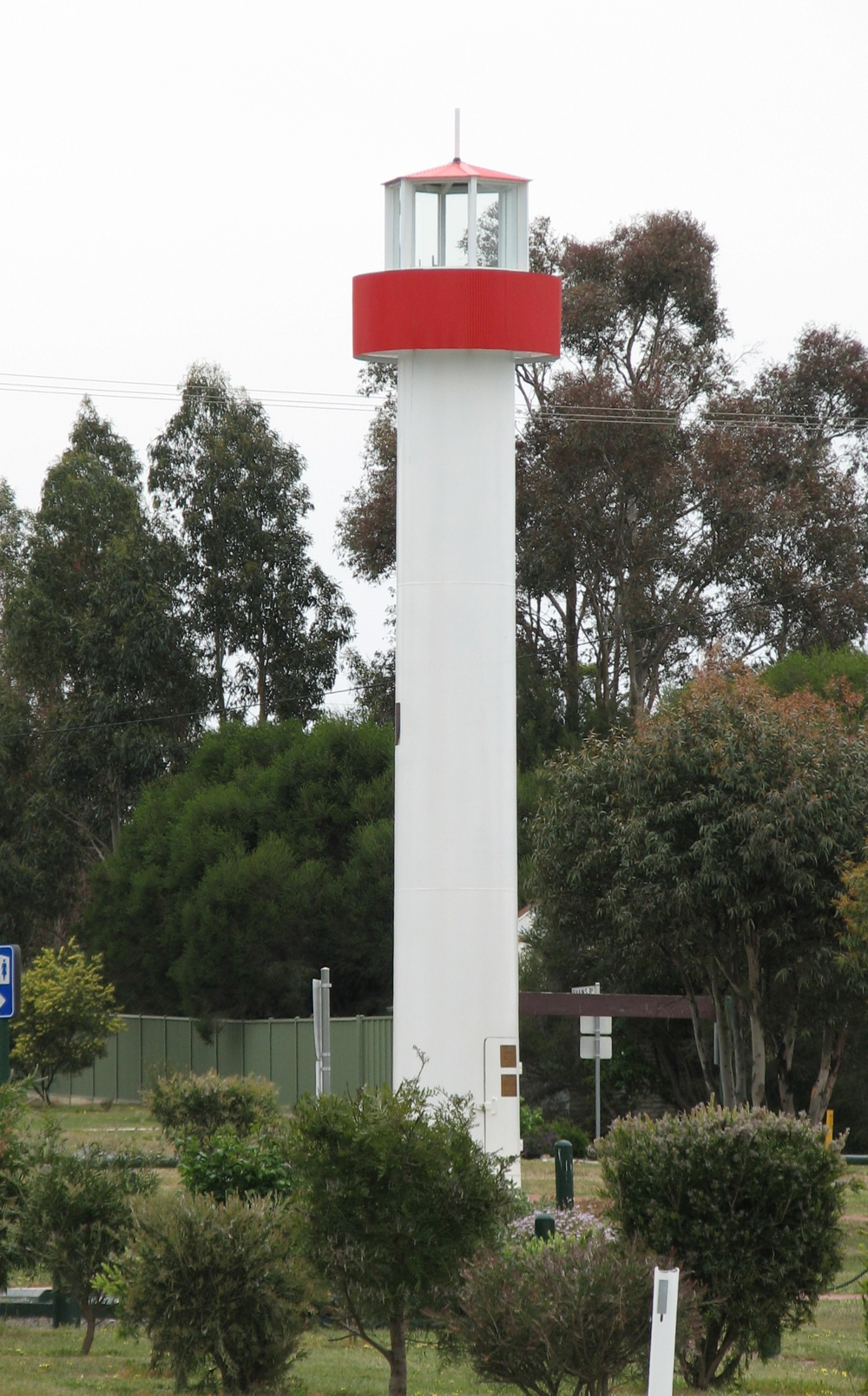
Cape Clear lighthouse, 2008

The Cape Clear cast iron mileposts, on both the Lismore-Scarsdale Road and the Rokewood-Skipton Road, are listed on the Victorian Heritage Register.

== Cape Clear hotel ==
A hotel at Cape Clear Hotel was originally established in the 1860s, during the gold rush. Over the years, it has served as a meeting place for both locals and travellers. It is known for its collection of historical photos and memorabilia, reflecting the town's past. While the building has been modified over time, it remains an important part of the local history. In 1935, a new building was constructed to serve as a in hotel and restaurant, and has remained largely unchanged since. However, in 2020, the hotel closed after the expiry of its liquor license, which had been held since the hotels' inception. The property has been sold several times since and will be re-opening as a licensed hotel in early-mid 2027

== Garage ==
The Cape Clear Garage is a large, white structure, built from corrugated iron, with two garage doors, a single front entrance, and four smaller windows. Its petrol bowsers stand prominently outside the building, a familiar sight to locals who remember it being run by "Uncle Tony and Auntie Betty" under the name Tony's TC. The garage was destroyed by fire in 2025.

== General Store ==
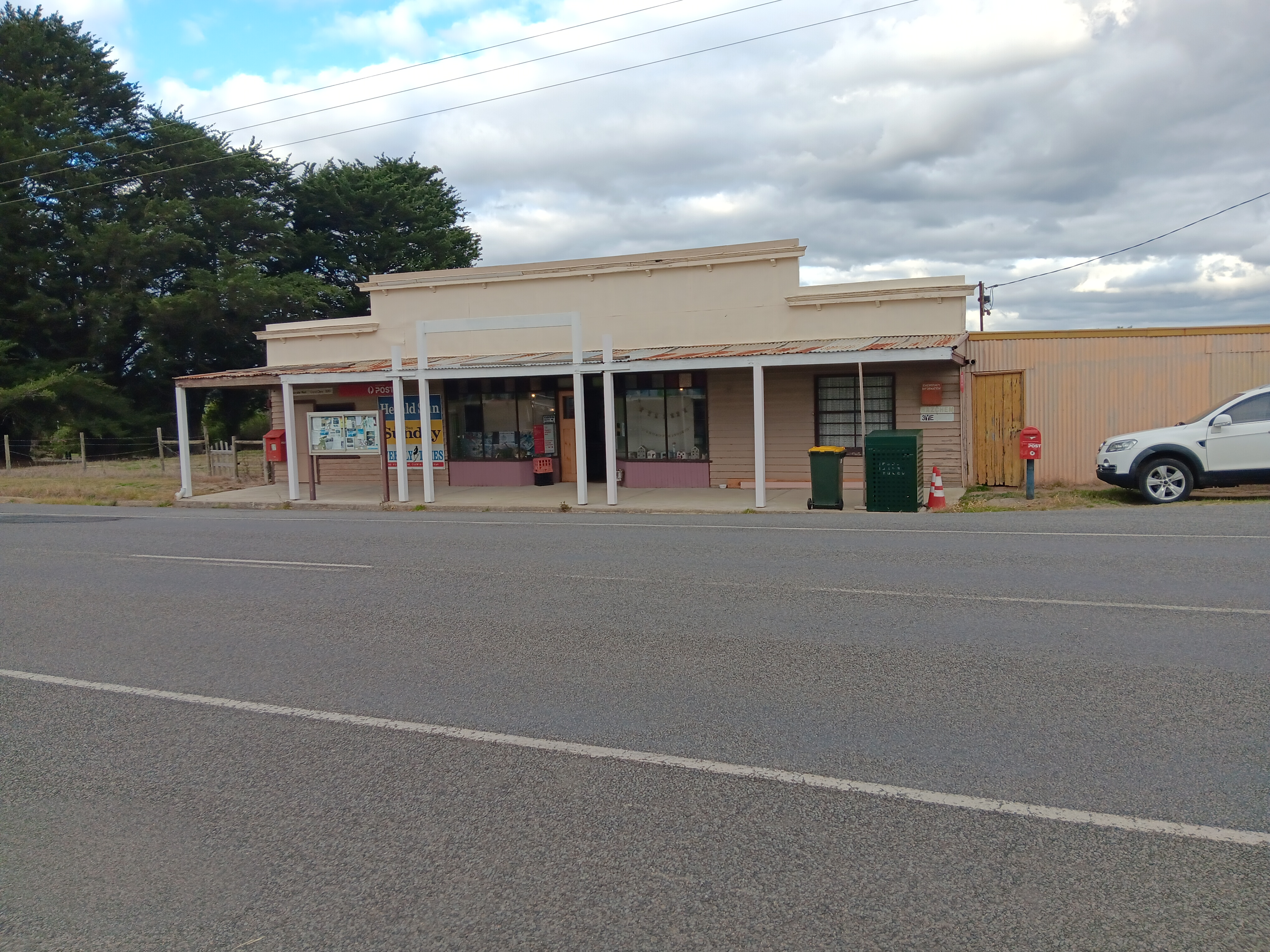
General Store, 2025

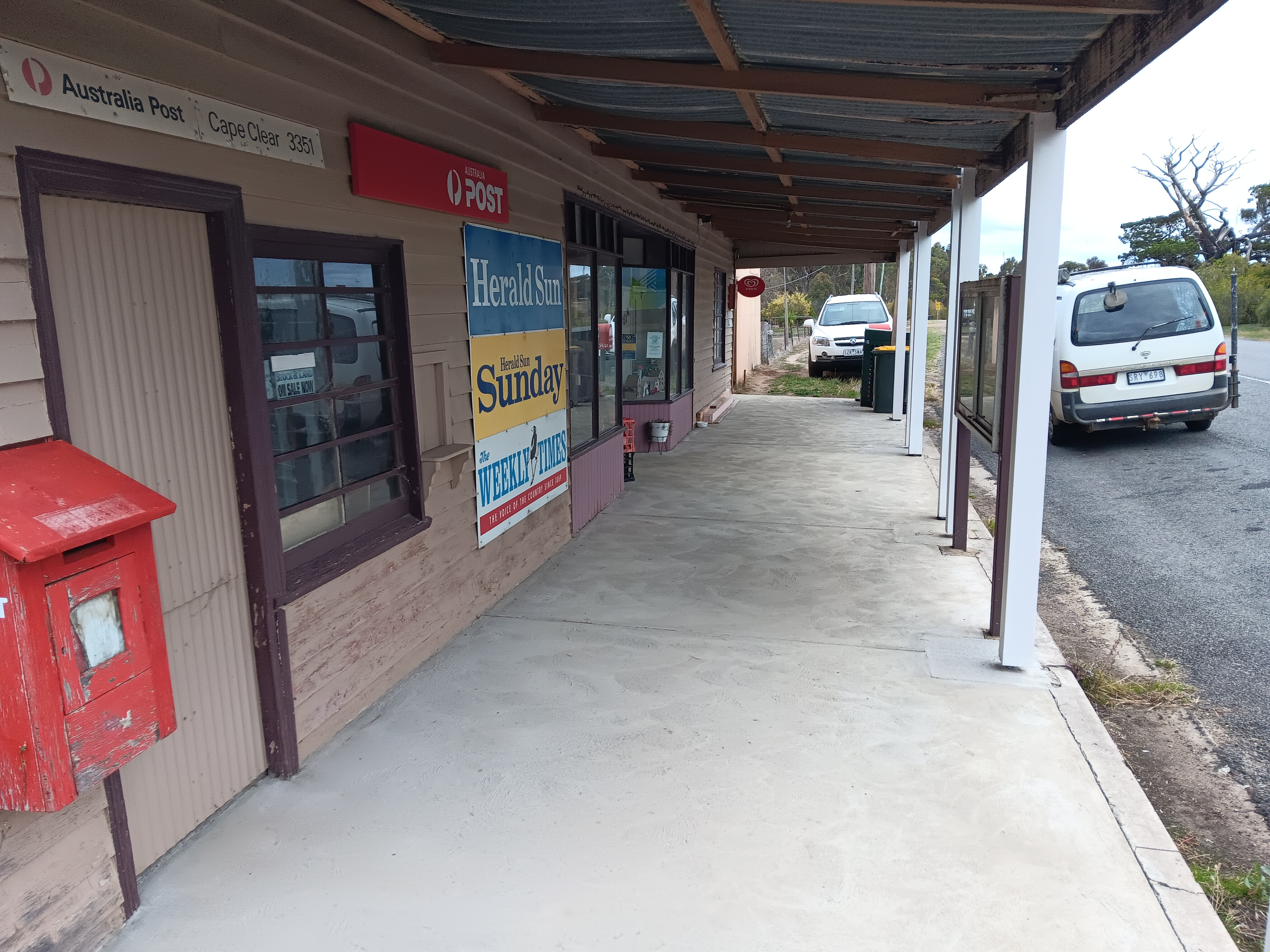
Post office section, 2025

The Cape Clear General Store was originally established in 1862 under the name Brown's Store and Bakery, and holds a significant place in the town's history. As the only general store in the town, it continues to serve as a vital hub for the local community, offering a diverse range of goods and everyday essentials. Over the years, it has maintained its role as a central gathering place for residents, reflecting both the history and enduring spirit of Cape Clear.

== Post Office ==
Cape Clear post office opened on 17 April 1865, and still owned and run by the same family. It is operated as part of the Cape Clear General Store. Beyond its practical function, the post office also helps maintain connections between residents and the wider region, supporting both personal and business communication. Its presence within the General Store adds to the store's significance as a hub for daily life in Cape Clear.

== Primary School ==
Cape Clear Primary School opened in January 1875. It is situated on the Pitfield-Scarsdale Road, next to the community hall and reserve.

== Recreation Reserve ==
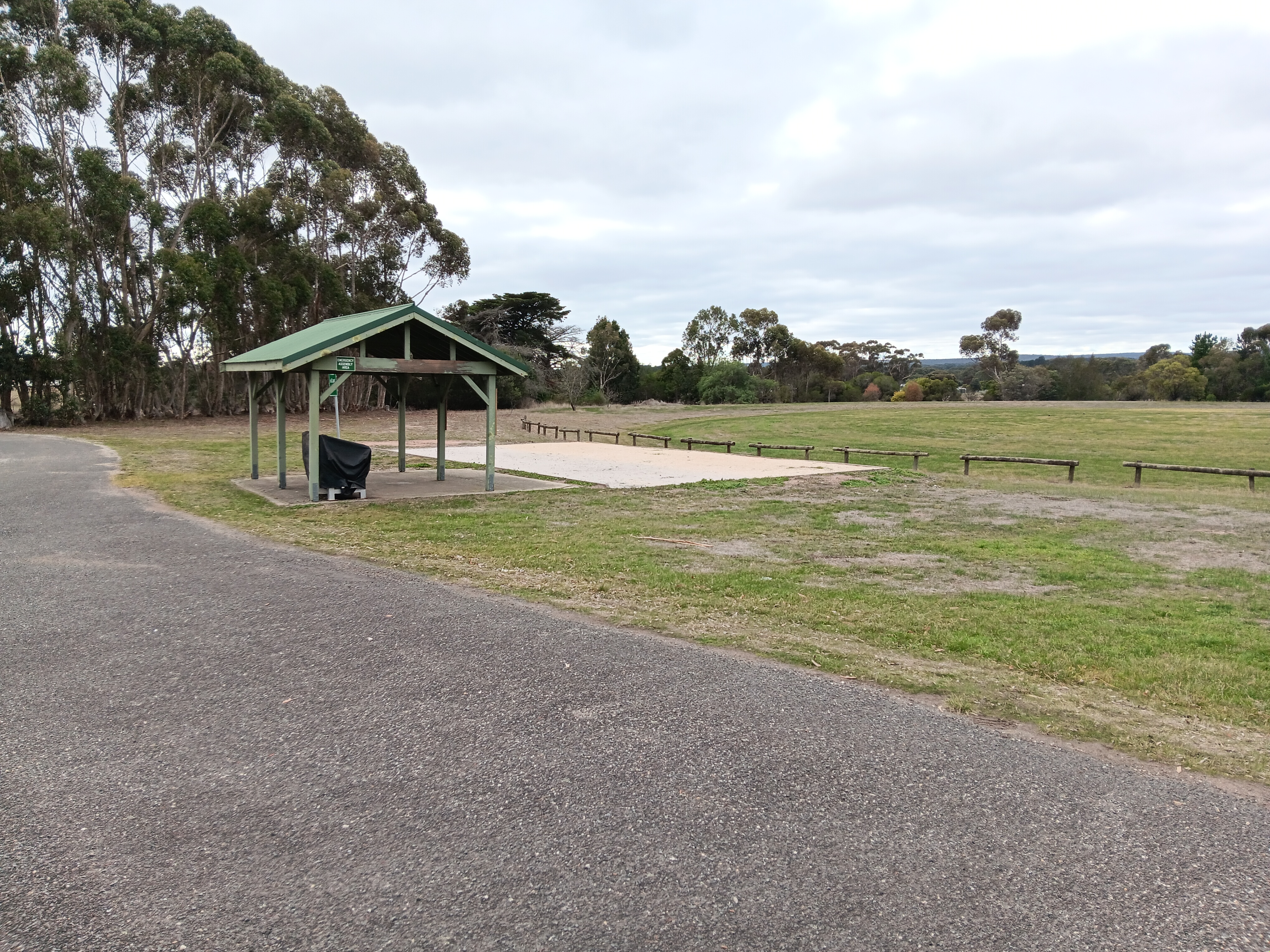
Recreation reserve, 2025

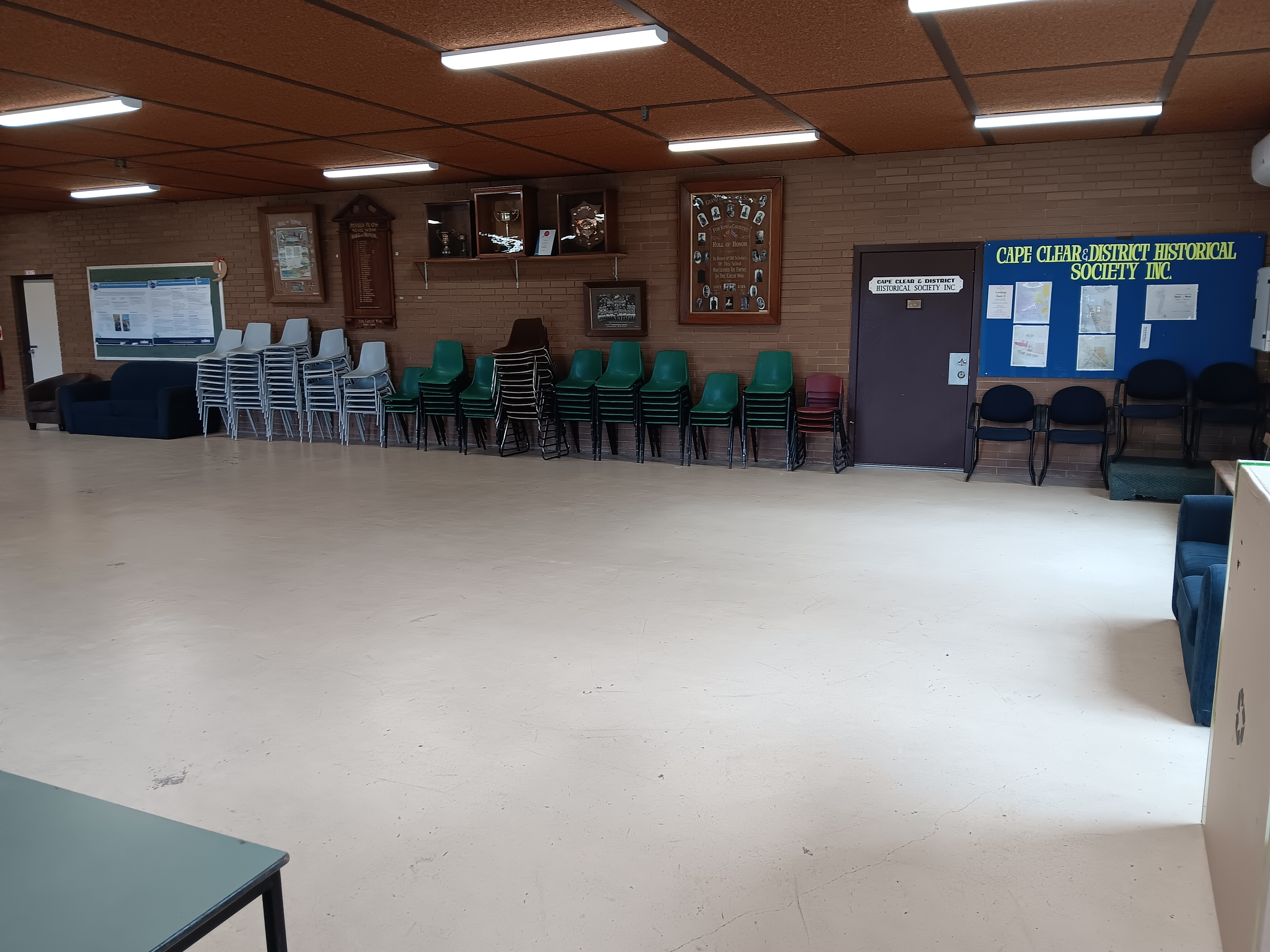
Recreation centre interior, 2025

The Cape Clear Recreation Reserve includes a sporting oval, with a small shelter, and the Cape Clear Recreation Reserve Hall, which is managed by the Cape Clear Recreation Reserve Committee of Management. The committee receives support from the Golden Plains Shire, which provides annual maintenance grants to help sustain the facility. The hall is powered by an off-the-grid solar system.

Image: https://timesnewsgroup.com.au/goldenplains/news/tai-chi-teachings-to-clear-the-mind/

The community holds regular gatherings every Thursday, offering a welcoming space for residents to enjoy coffee and conversation during the day, followed by hot, home-cooked meals in the evening.

The Victorian state government provided a grant to upgrade the hall and the surrounding reserve. The funding was to support a range of projects aimed at upgrading facilities, increasing accessibility and enhancing the overall environment for the benefit of all residents and visitors.

== The Bore ==
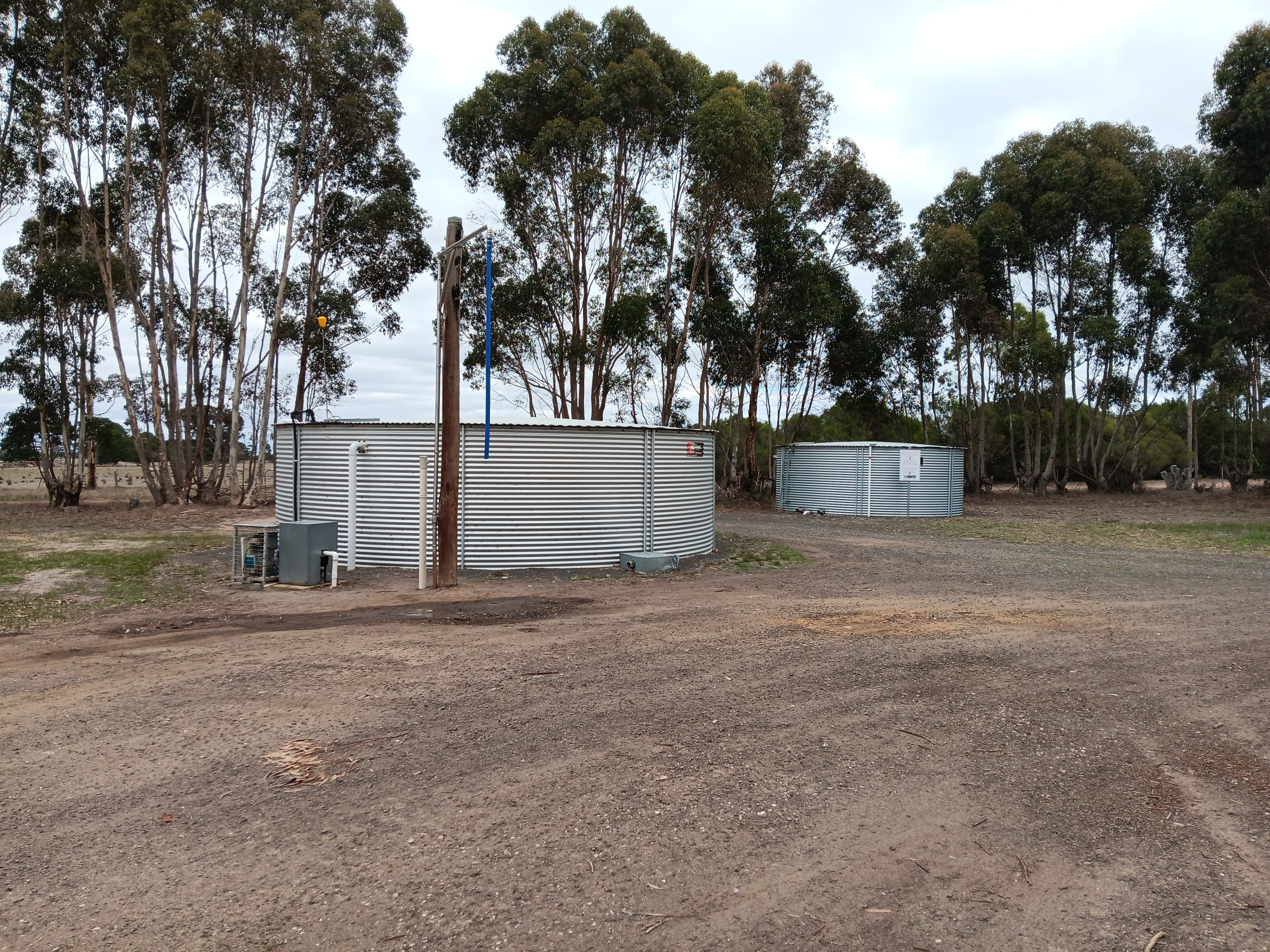
Water bore and storage tanks, 2025

A water bore is sited in the reserve, along with the original 100,000-litre storage tank. Recently, an additional 58,000-litre tank was installed to further enhance water storage capacity. A new standpipe was added to improve water access and distribution. As well as providing a water supply to the reserve, the facilities are part of the Golden Plains Shire Council network and are primarily used for stock and domestic water supply, available to residents through a permit system.

Image: http://www.capeclearfirebrigade.com/7/about

== Fire Brigade ==
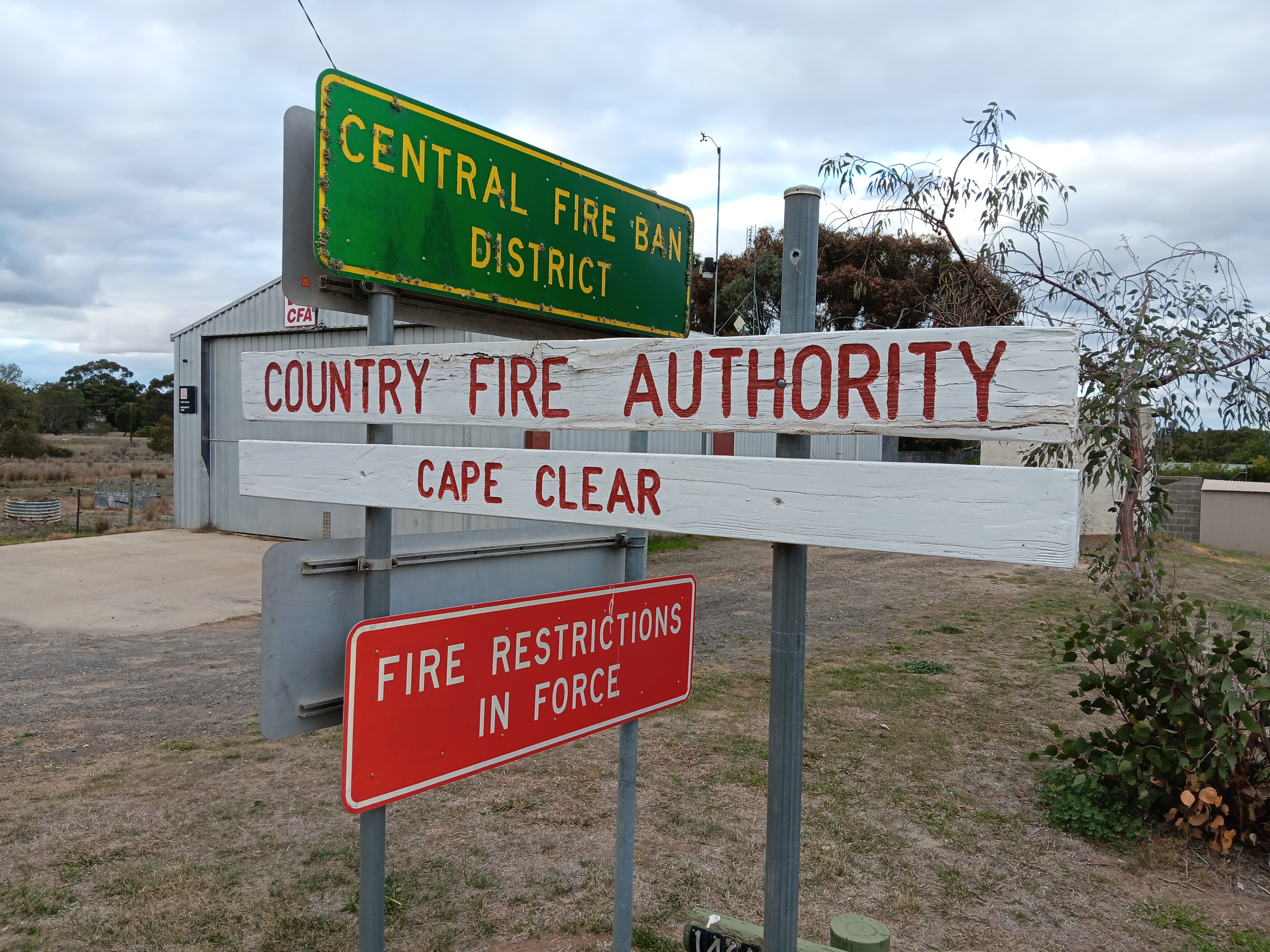
Fire brigade signage and garage, 2025

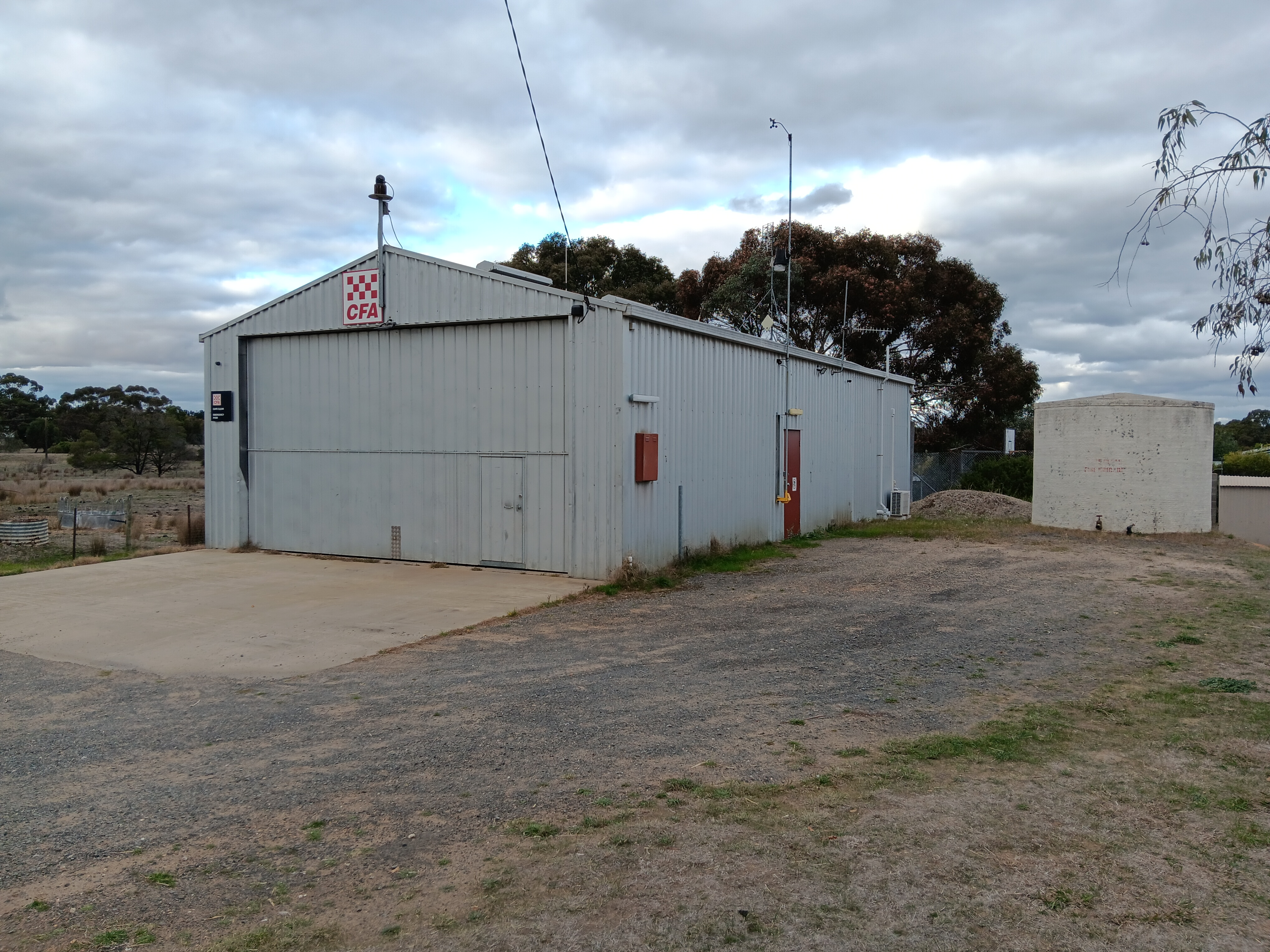
Fire brigade garage, 2025

The Cape Clear Rural Fire Brigade is a volunteer-based firefighting organization serving the adjacent rural communities of Cape Clear, Berringa, Staffordshire Reef, Piggoreet, Springdallah, and Pitfield. Operating under the Country Fire Authority (CFA), the brigade is an essential part of the region's emergency management infrastructure, dedicated to protecting the area from bushfires and structure fires, and dealing with other emergencies.

The brigade is primarily staffed by local volunteers who, in addition to their emergency response duties, engage in community education and fire prevention programs, aiming to raise awareness about fire safety and preparedness among local residents.

The brigade operates out of a depot which is equipped with several fire engines. Historical images related to the brigade are displayed at the Cape Clear Hotel, adding to the community's connection to the brigade's history.

== Reservoir ==
The Cape Clear Reservoir is a vital piece of local infrastructure, supplying water to most of the town. Its effectiveness depends on the elevation of individual properties, with those situated at lower levels receiving water directly from the reservoir. Properties located at higher elevations, however, typically rely on alternative sources such as their own tank water, the bore at the nearby reserve, or purchased water supplies.

== Church ==
The Cape Clear Methodist church, which opened in the 1860s, was sold into private ownership in 2019.

== Cemetery ==
The Cape Clear Cemetery is an active burial ground in Cape Clear, Victoria. Established in 1868, it contains the grave sites of early European settlers, local families, and miners. The cemetery is still open and reflects the region's heritage and the community's evolution over time.

== Temperature and Climate ==
The township frequently experiences strong winds during the month of August, with gusty conditions being a notable feature of the late winter season. While snowfall in the area is quite rare, there have been occasional instances in the past where the town has witnessed light snowfalls, adding a brief but memorable touch of winter to the local landscape.

Bush Fires 2026, As of Jan 9th the town as given an evacuate order when nearby fires threaten the surrounding area while the area is still on fire the town is no longer at risk.

== Watercourse ==
Illabarook Creek, which flows just to the east of the town, is a local landmark, crossed by a modern concrete bridge on the Cape Clear-Rokewood Road.

== Railway ==
The Newtown-Cressy railway ran to the east of the town. It was opened in 1911 and was closed in 1953. There was no station at Cape Clear, the nearest ones being Berringa to the north and Illabarook to the south. A number of former railway bridges remain in the area.

== Heritage listed sites ==
The township of Cape Clear contains several heritage sites, including:

- Annis & George Bills Horse Trough, Cape Clear-Rokewood Rd, Cape Clear VIC 3351
- Browns Store, Post Office and Bakery, 1475 Pitfield-Scarsdale Rd, Cape Clear VIC 3351
- Cape Clear Hotel, 1470 Scarsdale-Pitfield Road, Cape Clear, VIC 3351
- Cape Clear Bluestone Bridge
- Cape Clear Church, 900 Scarsdale - Pitfield Road, Springdallah, Vic 3351

== Gallery ==
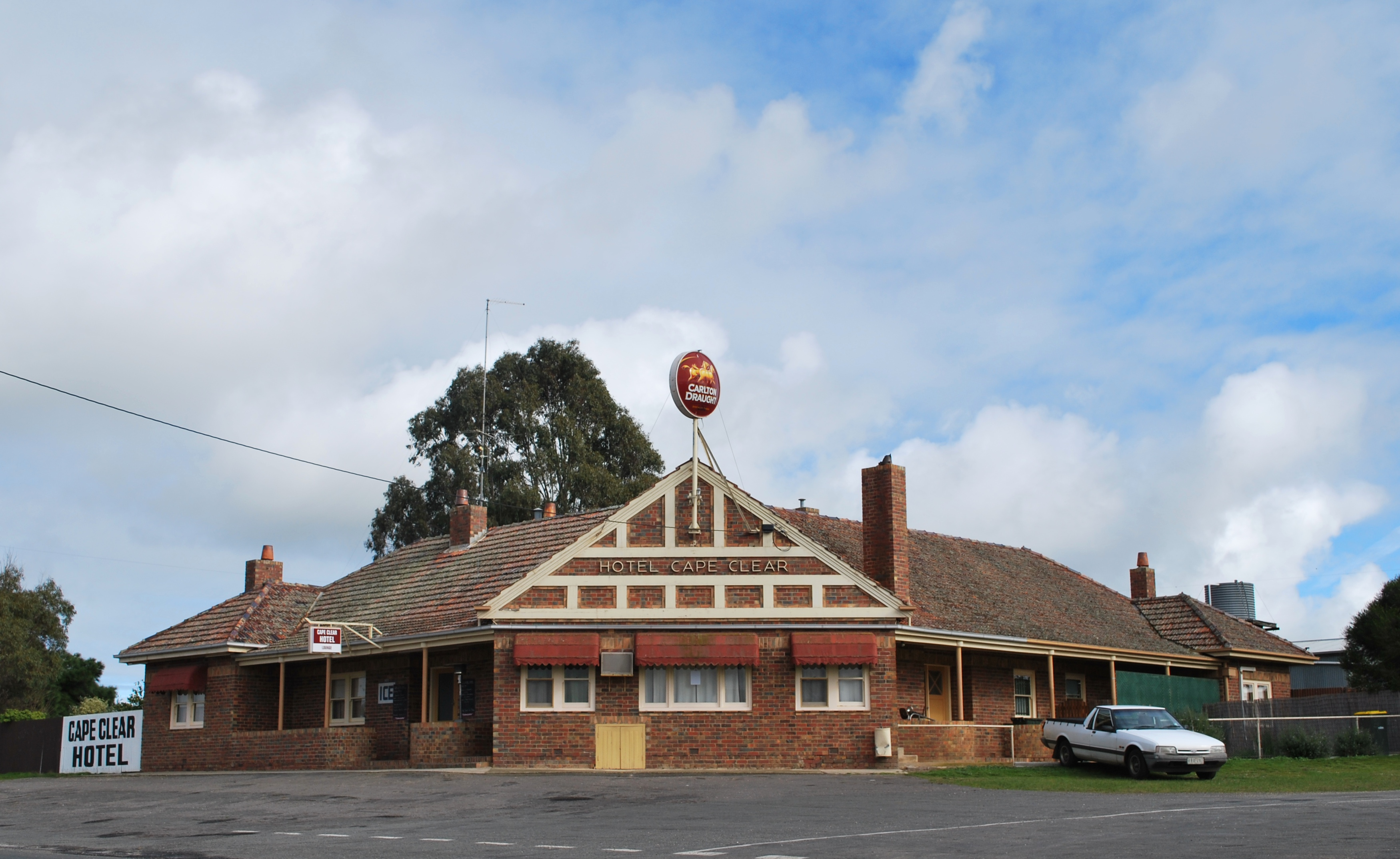
Cape Clear Hotel, 2010

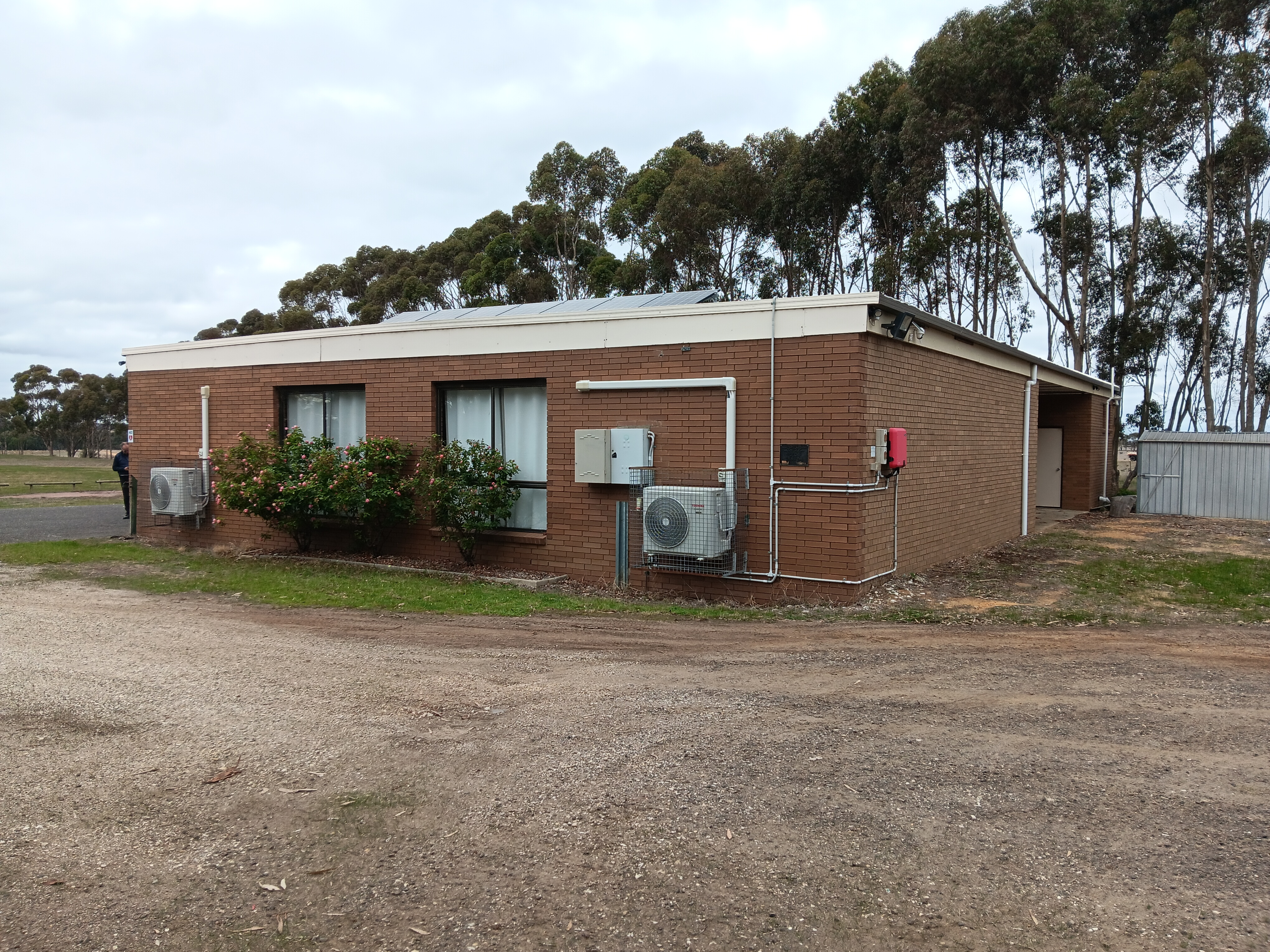
Recreation centre, 2025

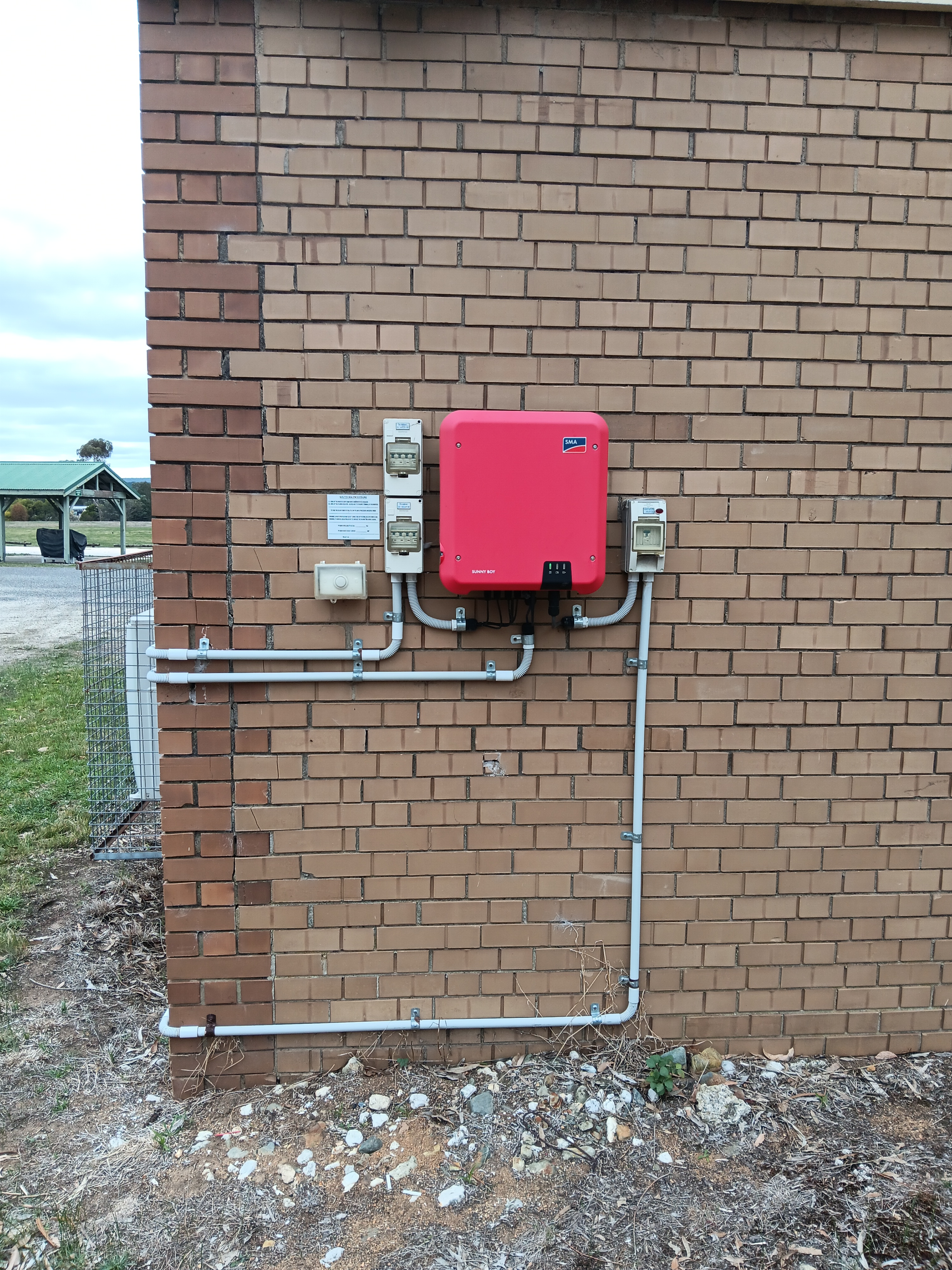
Close-up of recreation centre solar system controller, 2025

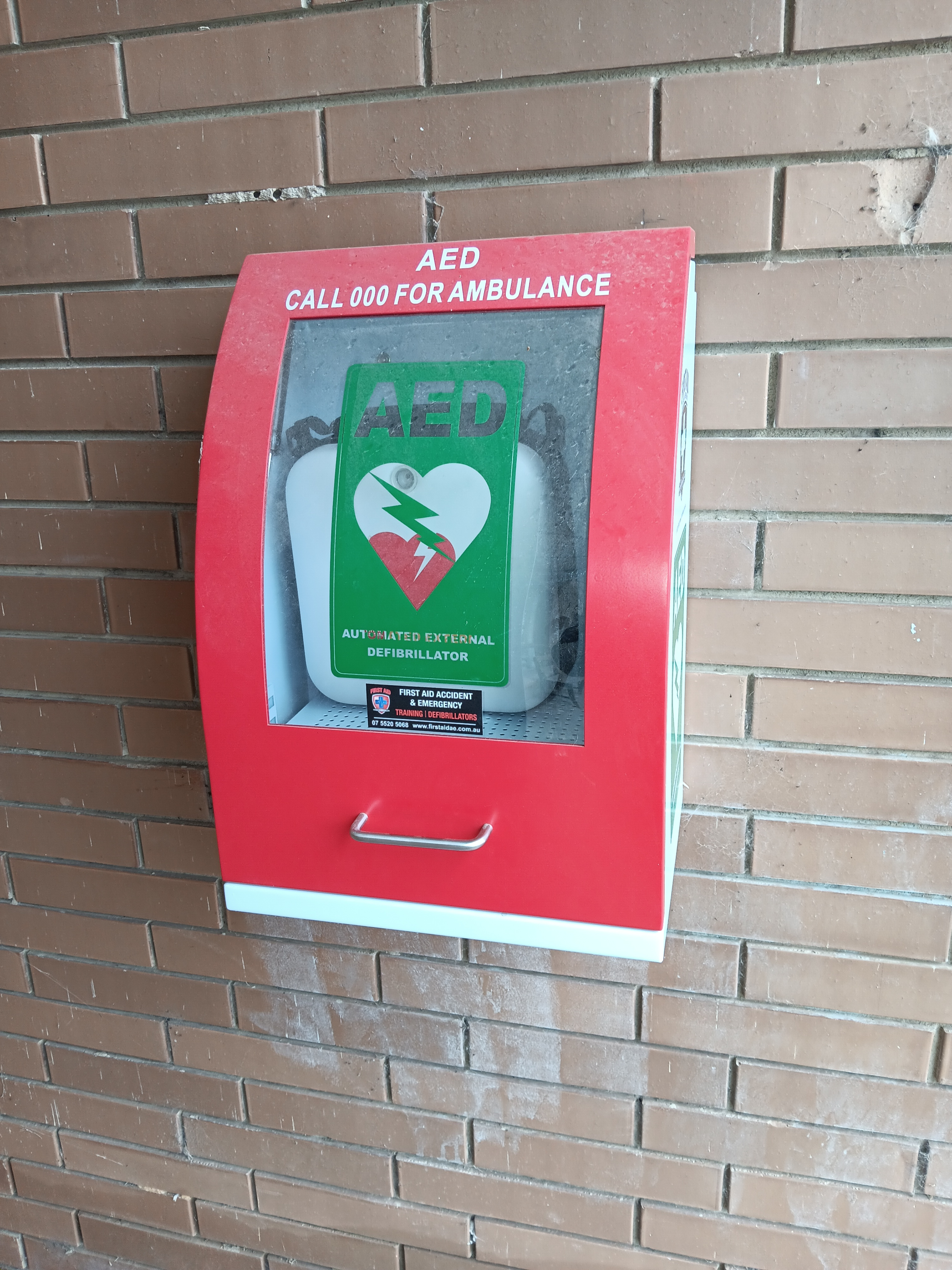
Defibrillator in recreation centre, 2025

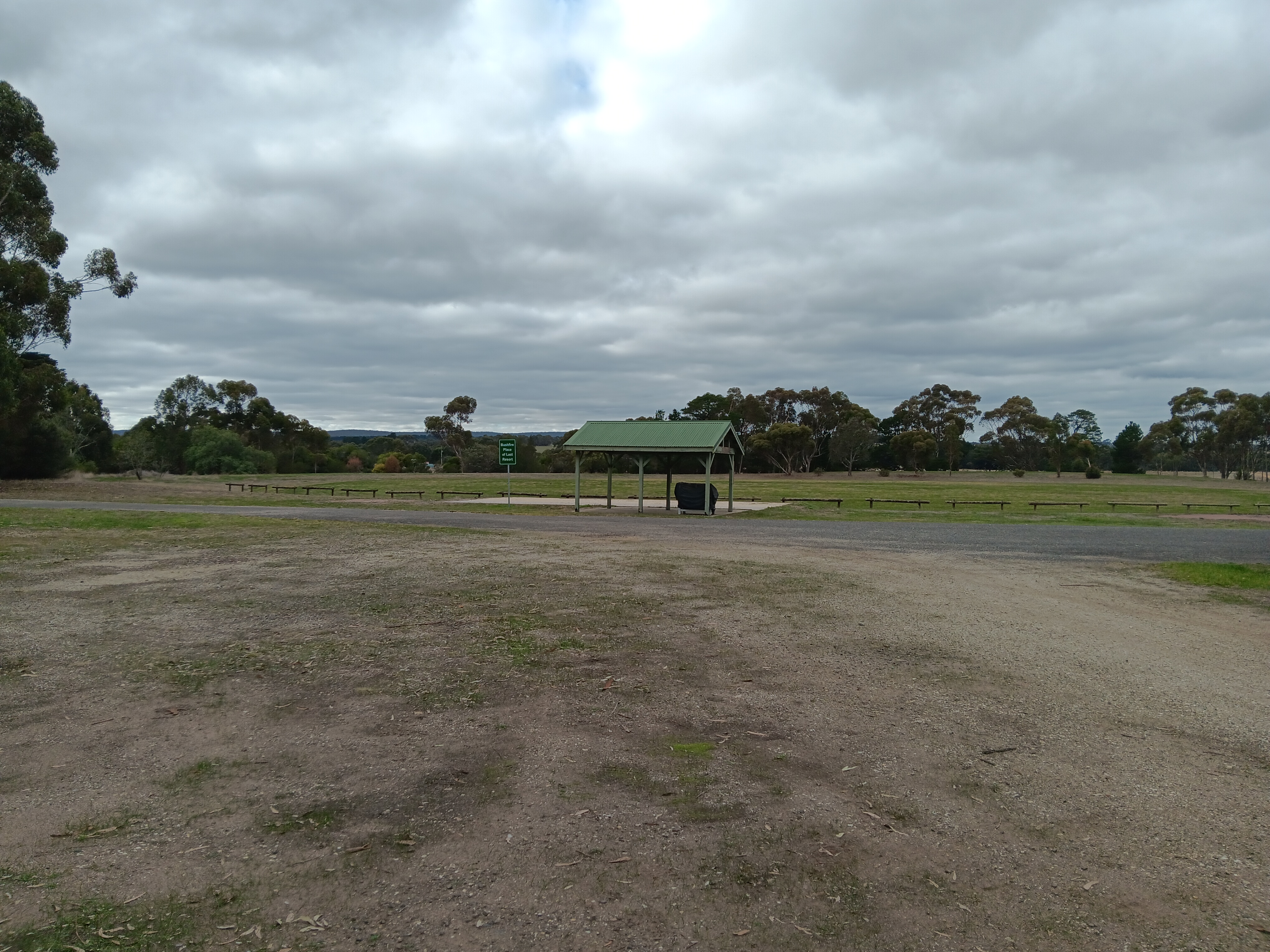
Cape Clear Reserve with shelter, 2025,

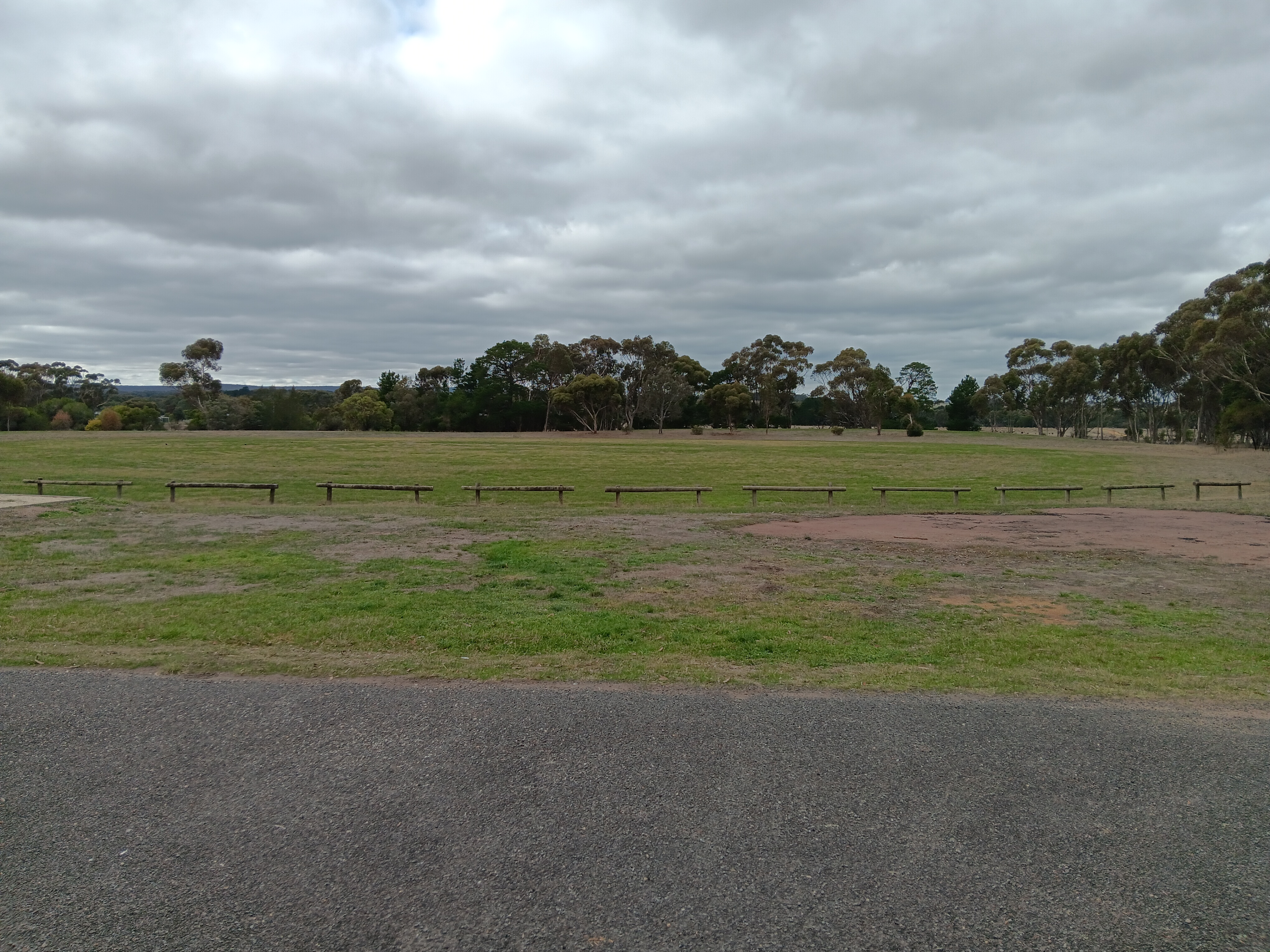
Cape Clear Reserve oval, 2025

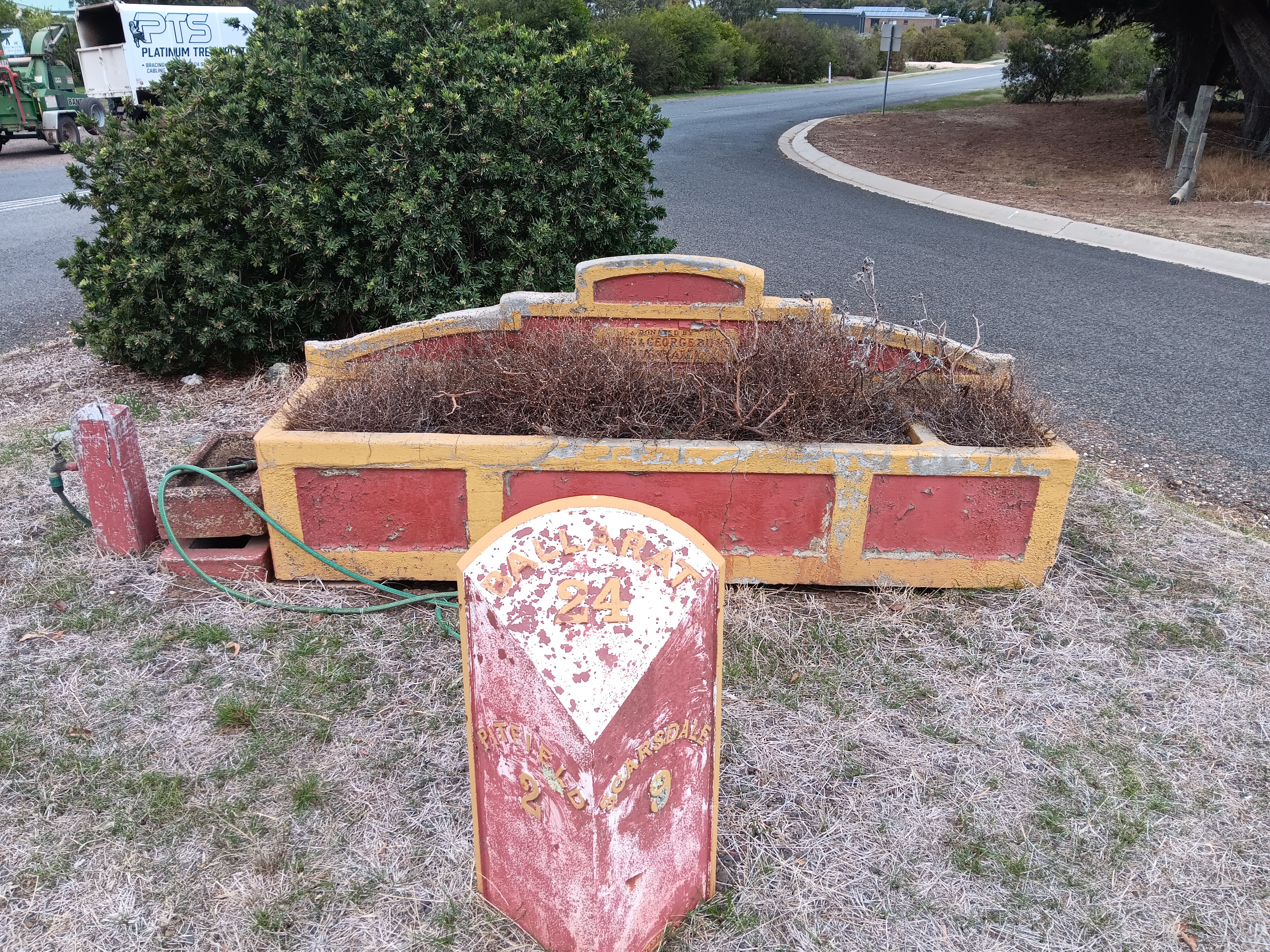
Annis & George Bills horse trough, 2025

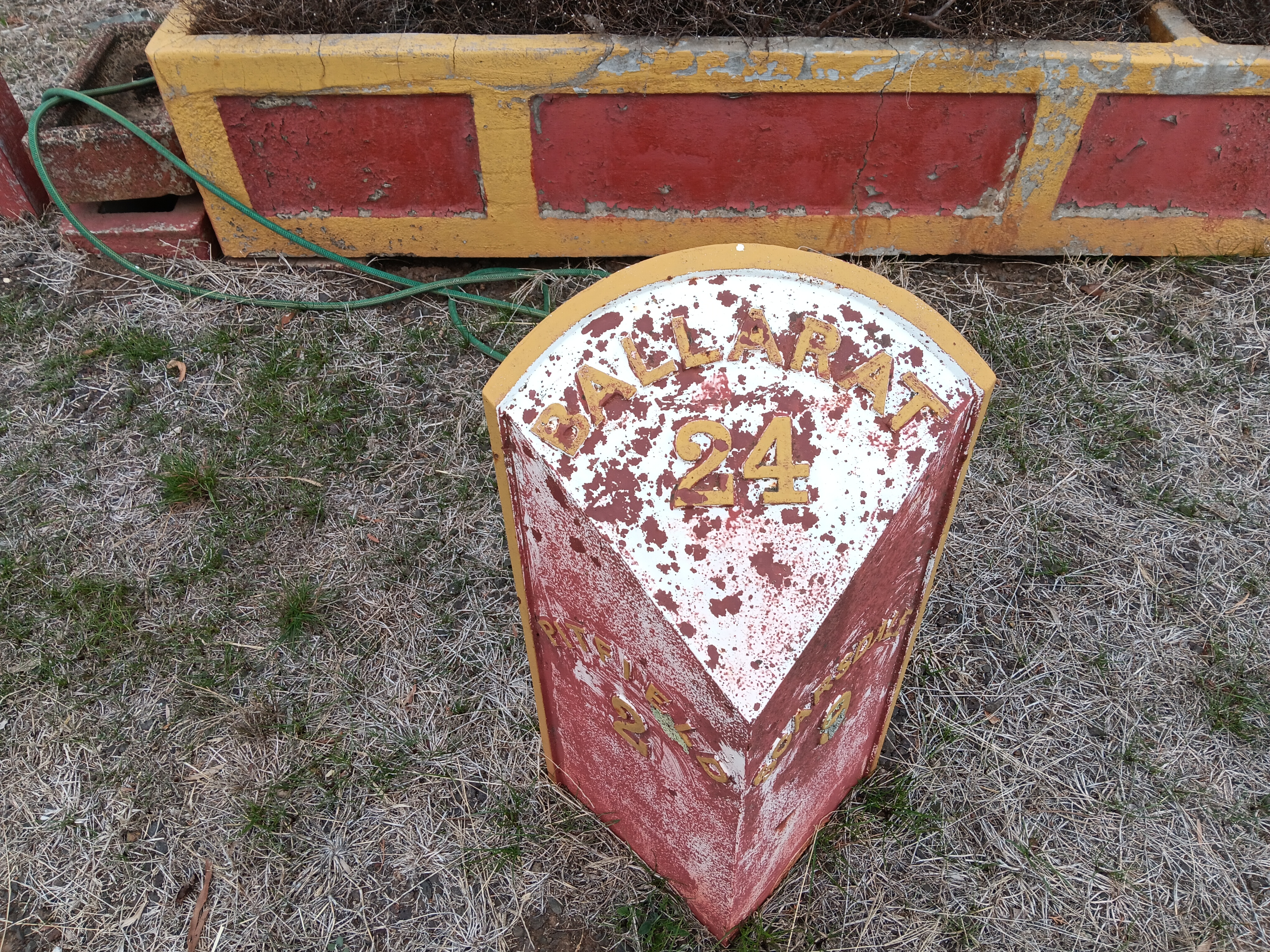
Annis & George Bills horse trough plaque, 2025

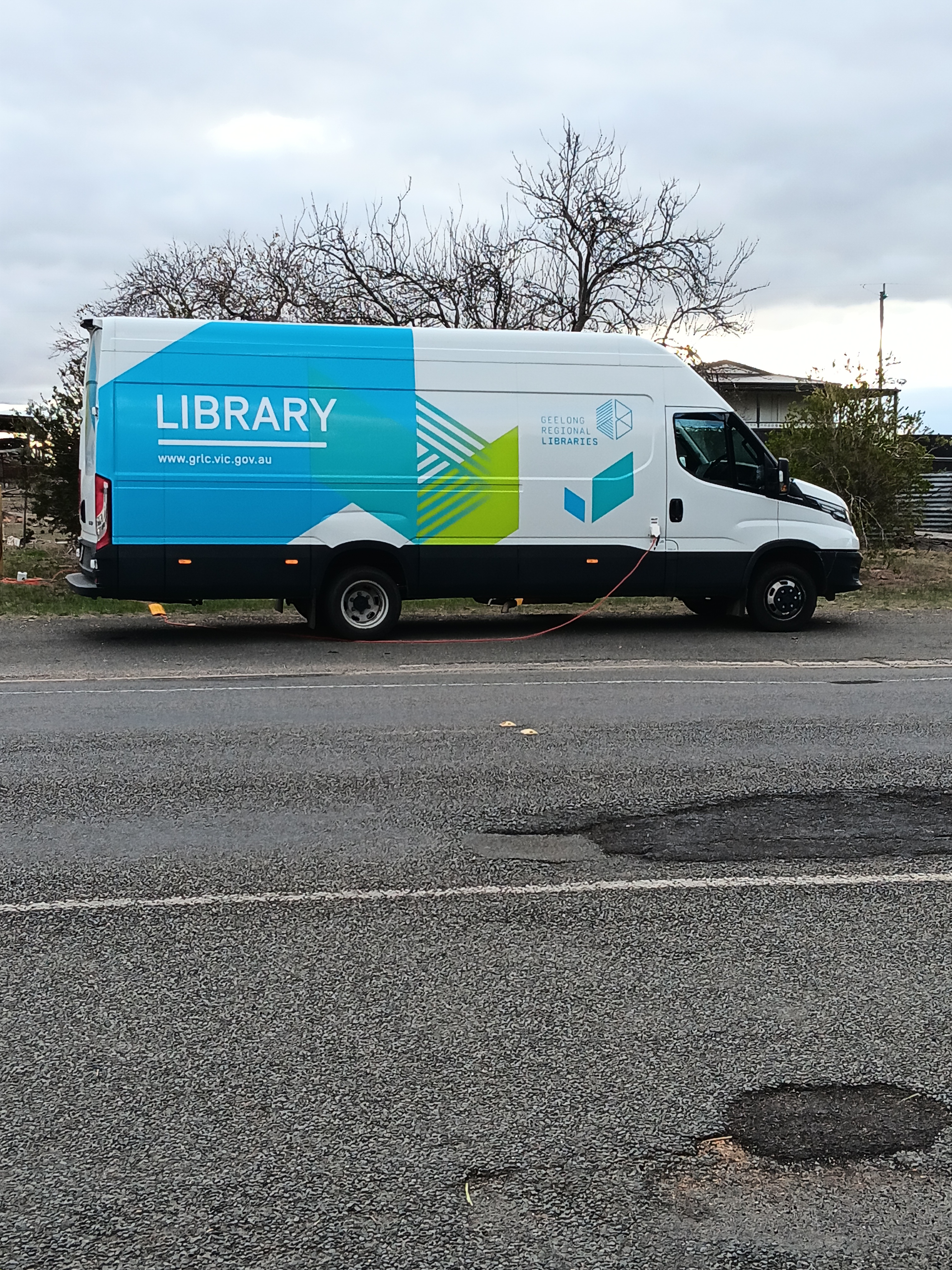
Geelong Regional Library mobile library at Cape Clear, 2025

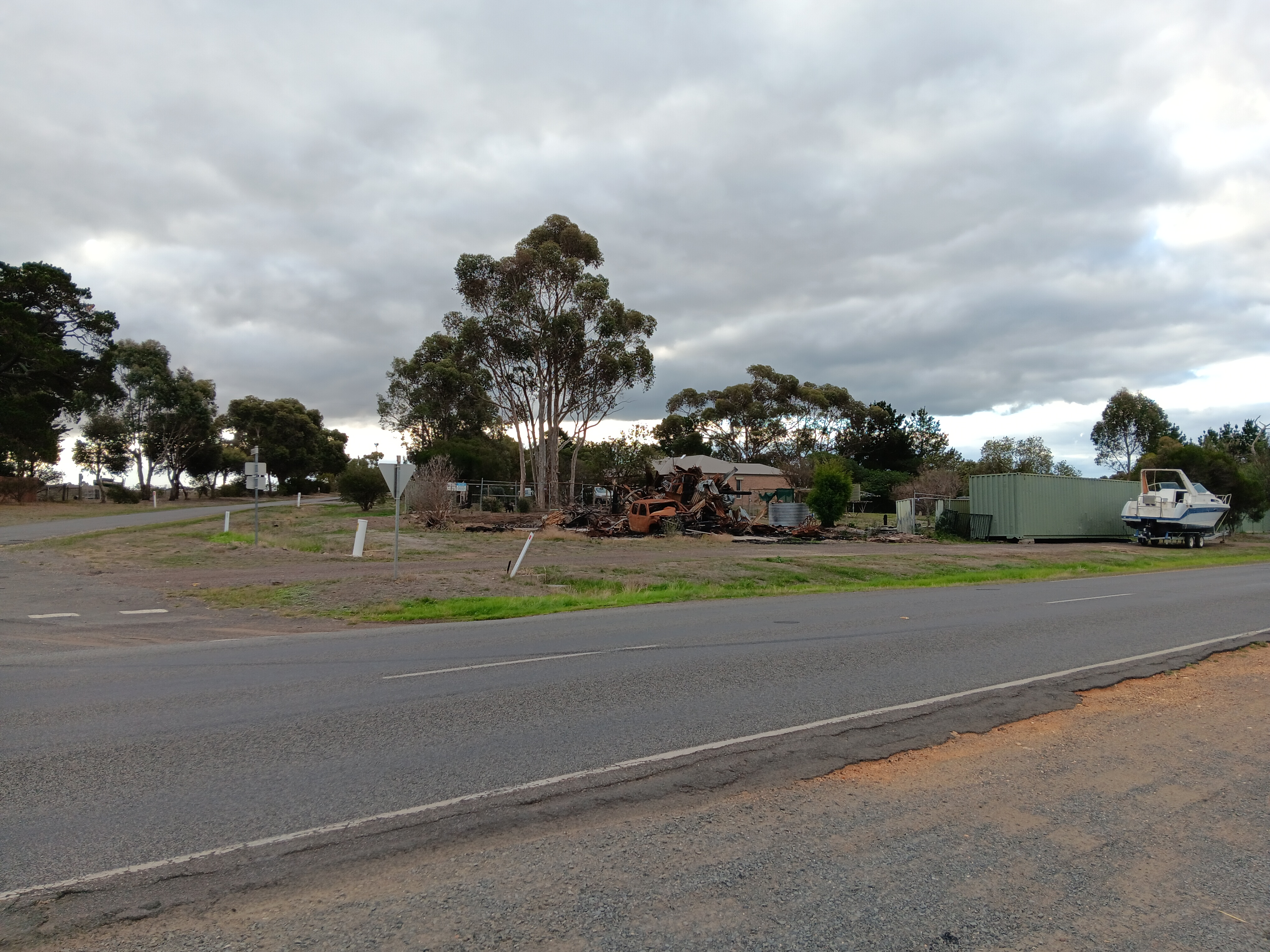
Remains of Cape Clear garage after fire, 2025

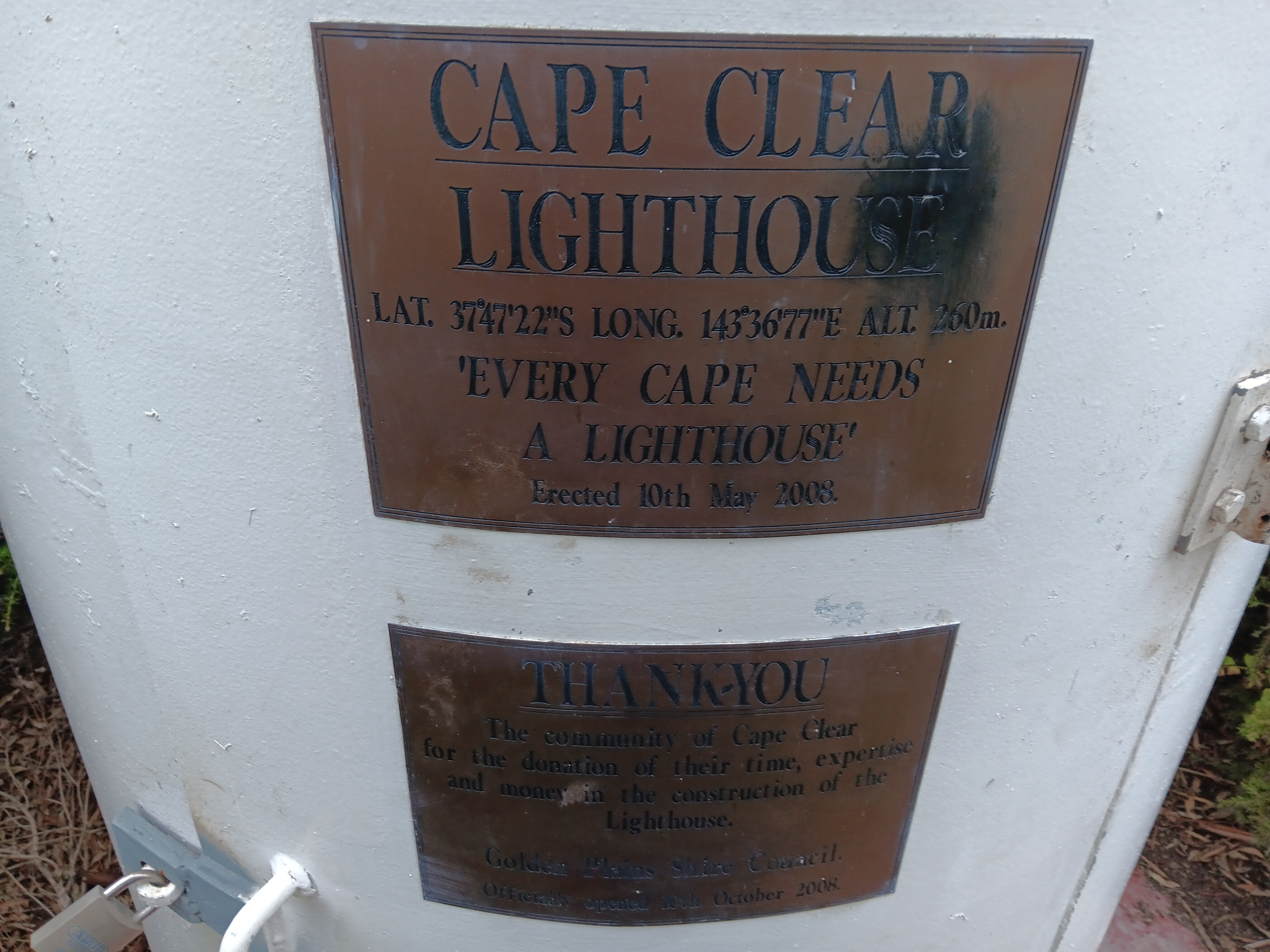
Lighthouse plaque, 2025

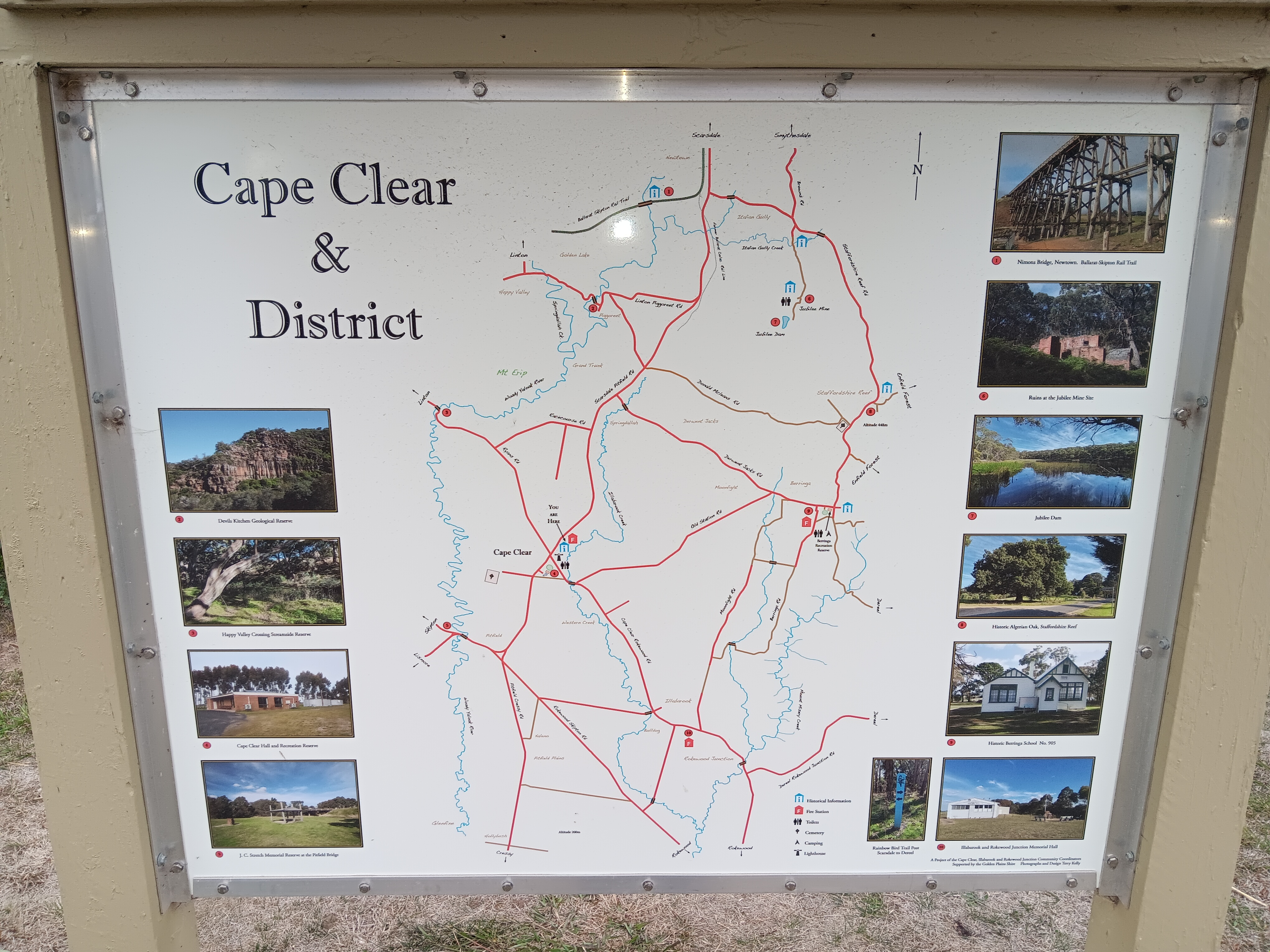
Cape Clear regional map, 2025

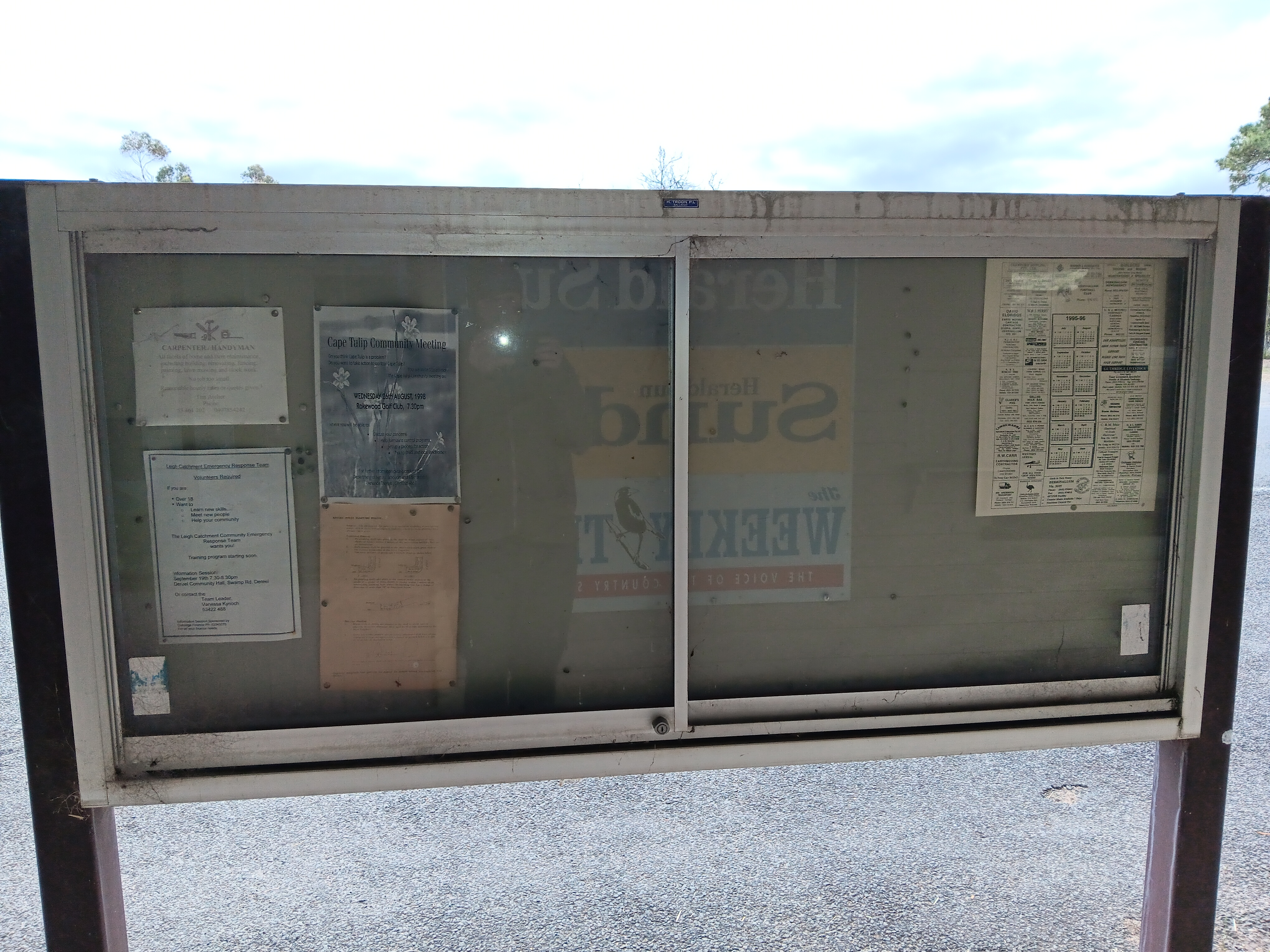
Cape Clear General Store notice board, 2025

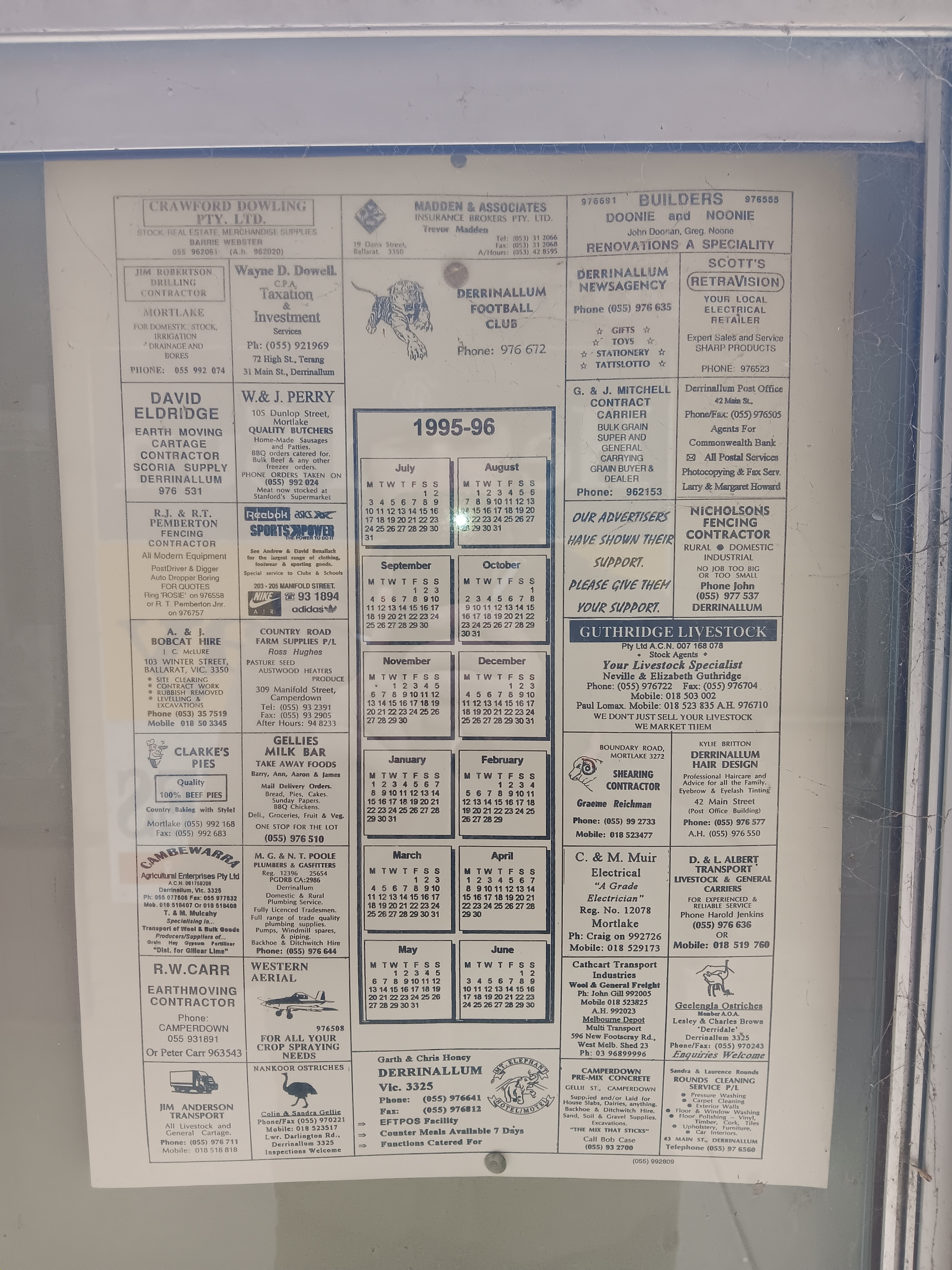
Close-up of notice board, 2025.
