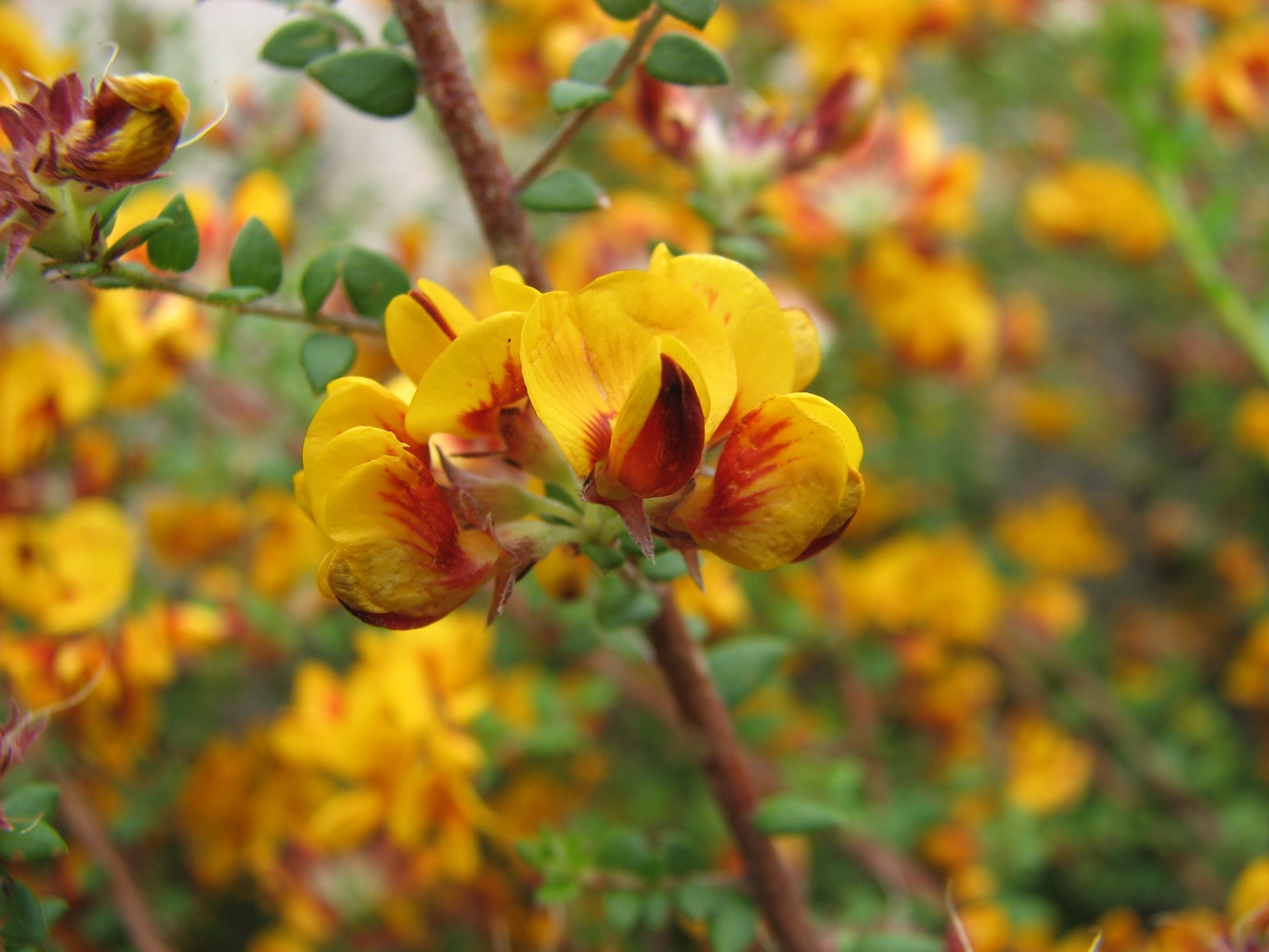
- Pultenaea gunnii in Kinglake National Park

Scientific classification
- Kingdom: Plantae
- Clade: Tracheophytes
- Clade: Angiosperms
- Clade: Eudicots
- Clade: Rosids
- Order: Fabales
- Family: Fabaceae
- Subfamily: Faboideae
- Genus: Pultenaea
- Species: P. gunnii

Binomial name
- Pultenaea gunnii Benth.

= Pultenaea gunnii =

Golden bush-pea

Species of legume

Pultenaea gunnii, commonly known as golden bush-pea, is a species of flowering plant in the family Fabaceae and is endemic to south-eastern Australia. It is a slender, erect to spreading shrub with hairy young stems, egg-shaped to lance-shaped leaves with lance-shaped stipules at the base, and bright yellow and dark red flowers.

== Description ==
Pultenaea graveolens is a slender, erect to spreading shrub that typically grows to a height of up to 2 m (6 ft 7 in) and stems that are sparsely hairy when young. The leaves are arranged alternately, egg-shaped to lance-shaped, 2–6 mm (0.079–0.236 in) long and 1–3 mm (0.039–0.118 in) wide with lance-shaped stipules about 0.75–1.5 mm (0.030–0.059 in) long at the base. The flowers are bright yellow to dark red and arranged in groups of more than three near the ends of short side branches. The sepals are silky-hairy, 5–7 mm (0.20–0.28 in) long with lance-shaped bracteoles 1–2 mm (0.039–0.079 in) long at the base of the sepal tube. The standard petal is 6–8 mm (0.24–0.31 in) long and the ovary is hairy. Flowering occurs from September to November and the fruit is a flattened pod.

== Taxonomy and naming ==
Pultenaea gunnii was first formally described in 1837 by George Bentham in the Commentationes de Leguminosarum Generibus from specimens collected by Ronald Campbell Gunn near Campbell Town in 1836.

In 1993 Margaret Corrick described two subspecies in the journal Muelleria and the names are accepted by the Australian Plant Census:

- Pultenaea gunnii Benth. subsp. gunnii has the edges of the leaves curved downwards;
- Pultenaea gunnii subsp. tuberculata Corrick has the edges of the leaves thickened, but not curved downwards.

== Distribution and habitat ==
Golden bush-pea is common and widespread in eastern Victoria and in Tasmania, where it grows in forest and woodland. It is also found on the south coast of New South Wales. Subspecies tuberculata is only known from the Brisbane Ranges in southern Victoria.
