= Ballaarat New Cemetery =

Cemetery in Victoria, Australia

- Interactive map of Ballaarat New Cemetery

Details
- Established: 1867
- Location: Ballarat, Victoria
- Country: Australia
- Coordinates: 37.5313°S 143.8622°E
- Size: 55 ha (140 acres)
- No. of graves: 78,000
- Website: Ballaarat New Cemetery
- Find a Grave: Ballaarat New Cemetery
- Footnotes: Ballarat New Cemetery - Billion Graves

Ballaarat New Cemetery is a cemetery located in the rural city of Ballarat, Victoria in Australia. The cemetery dates back to 1867.

== Notable Interments ==
- F. W. Commons, monumental mason, and sculptor of many of the headstones in the cemetery
- James Esmond, gold miner
- Brother Paul Nunan, educationalist
- James Oddie, merchant, banker, landowner, scientist, astronomer, patron of the arts, and philanthropist.

== War graves ==
The cemetery contains the war graves of 56 Commonwealth service personnel. There are 24 from World War I and 32 from World War II.

== Note ==
The archaic spelling of Ballaarat has been used as on the official Ballaarat General Cemeteries website.

== See also ==
- Ballaarat Old Cemetery
