= Luke Tonkin =

Australian actor

Luke Tonkin is an Australian actor who made his professional musical theatre debut in the Helpmann-nominated children's musical My Grandma Lived in Gooligulch and toured the show nationally. He also played the role of the Big Bopper in the Australian tour of Buddy - The Buddy Holly Story. He has toured Australia in Wombat Stew, Happy Birthday Peter Rabbit and "Stripey". Tonkin also toured South Korea in a Theatre in Education production of "Twelve Singing Animals" for LATT Children's Theatre. Currently, Tonkin is co-creator and host of comedy trivia game show "The Price Is Wrong" for Sutton's House of Music.

Tonkin is well known in his home town of Ballarat due to his work with the Sweet Monas Choir, Entertainers Anonymous and Sovereign Hill. He is also remembered as the "Cougar Guy" in the Australian television commercial "5 Cougars Thanks".
