= Linton, Victoria =

Linton Kayjup
- Town
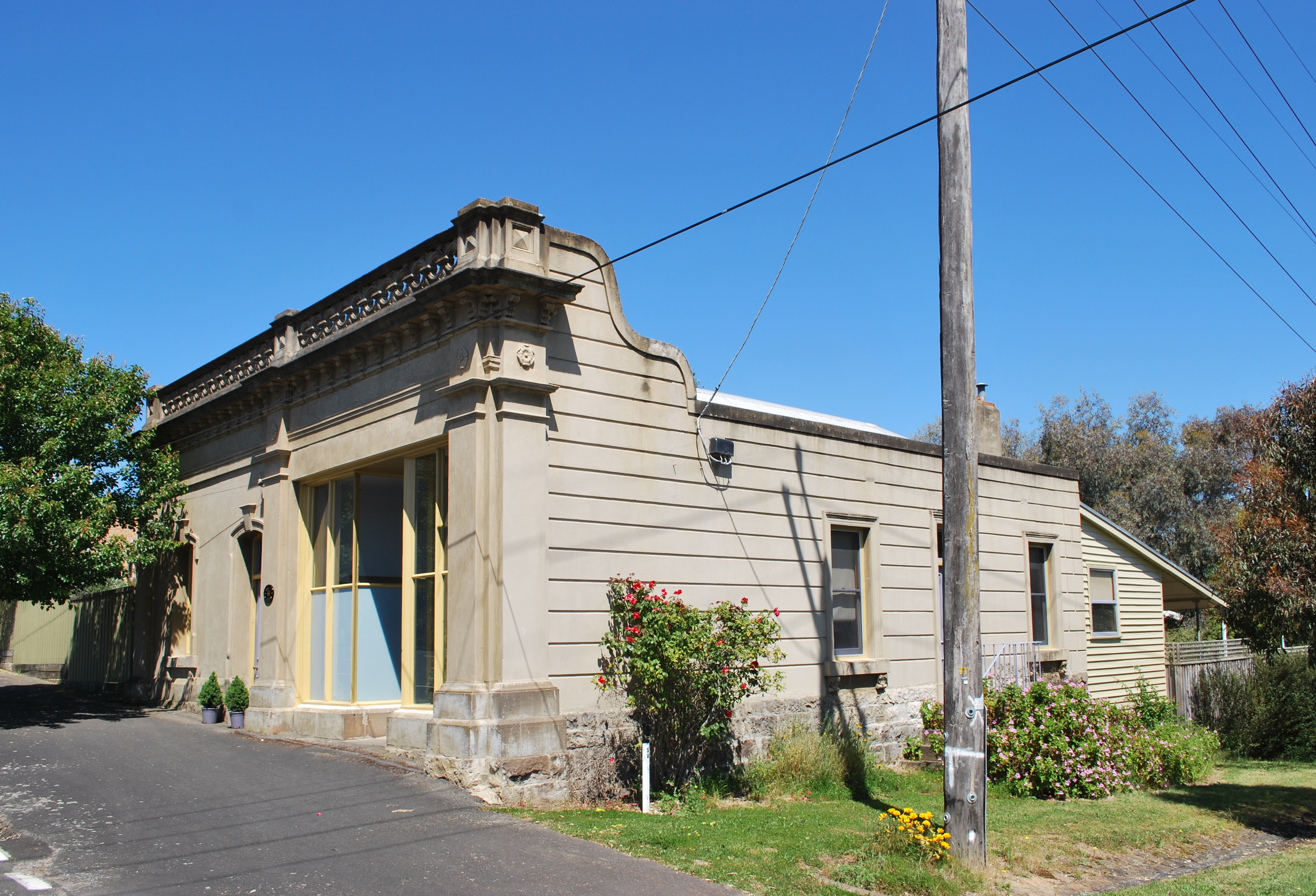
- The Barr building, once home to the local doctor's surgery and a haberdasher/glovemaker

- Coordinates: 37°41′0″S 143°34′0″E
- Country: Australia
- State: Victoria
- LGAs: Golden Plains Shire; Shire of Pyrenees
- Location: 149 km (93 mi) W of Melbourne; 33 km (21 mi) SW of Ballarat; 20 km (12 mi) E of Skipton

Government
  - State electorate: Ripon
  - Federal divisions: Wannon; Ballarat

Population
  - Total: 635 (2021 census)
- Postcode: 3360
Localities around Linton
Chepstowe	Snake Valley	Snake Valley
Pittong	Linton	Scarsdale; Happy Valley
Mannibadar	Mannibadar	Happy Valley

Linton is a town in Victoria, Australia, on the Glenelg Highway. Most of the town is located in Golden Plains Shire; however, a small section is in the Shire of Pyrenees. At the 2016 census, Linton and the surrounding area had a population of 580. The Clarkesdale Bird Sanctuary lies to the south-east of the township, near Springdallah Creek.

== History ==
Traditionally, the Wadawurrung people occupied the land around Linton and called the area "Kayjup". Today the park at Edinburgh Reserve recognises this history.

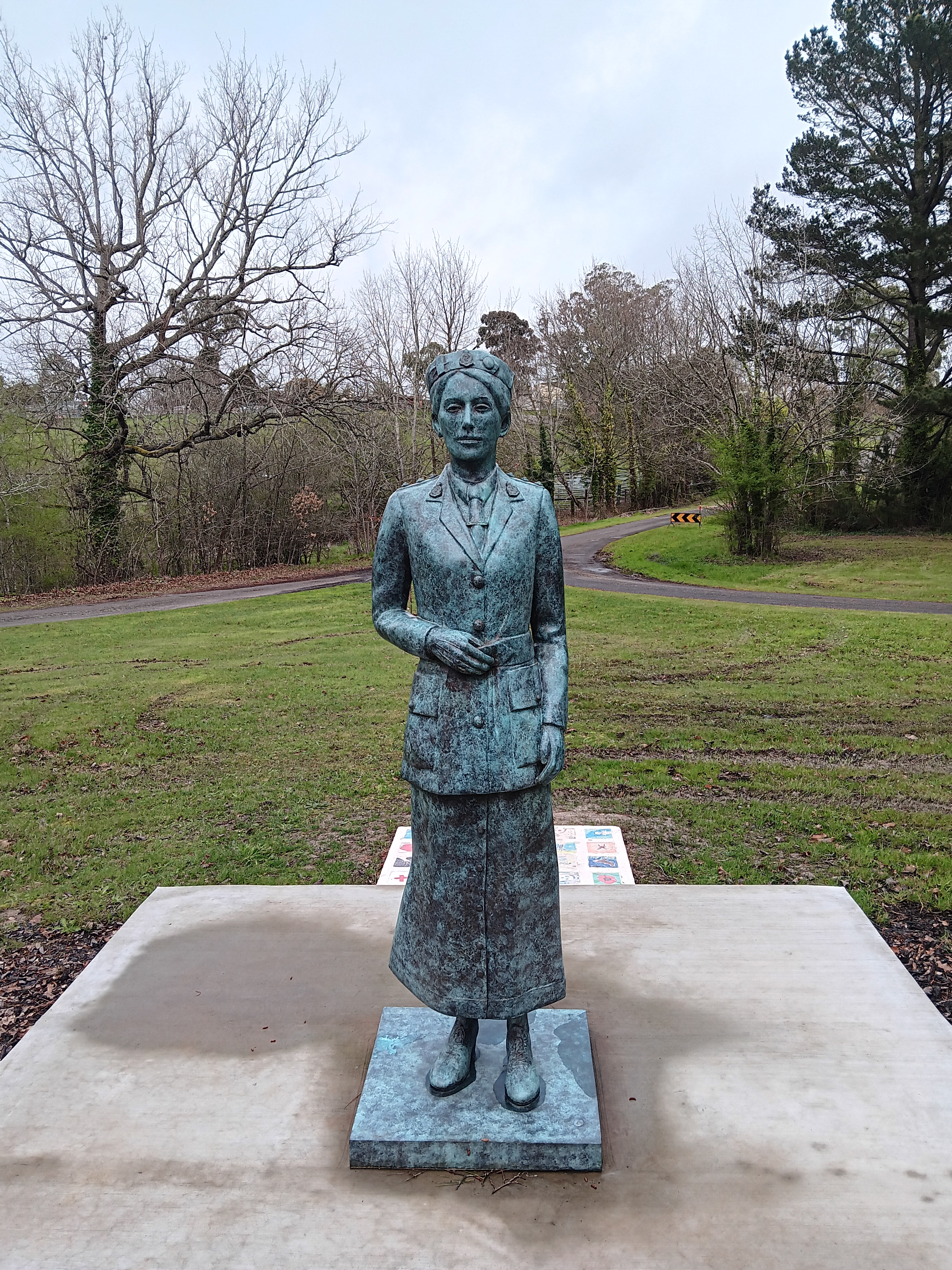
Statue of Dr Vera Scantlebury-Brown at Linton, Victoria

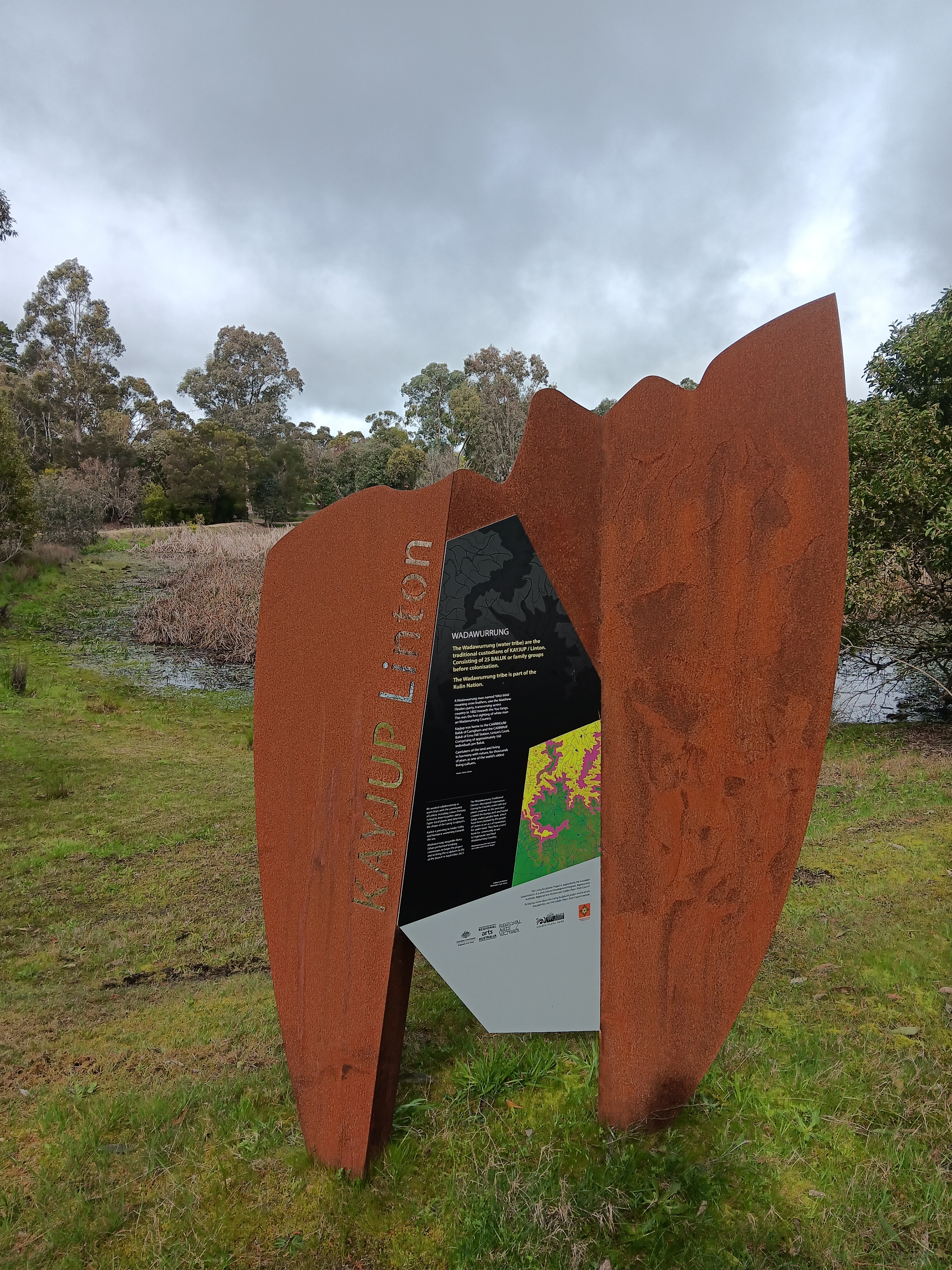
Kayjup signage at Edinburgh Reserve, Linton

Linton was then first settled by Europeans about 1840 and was named after a pioneer family in an area.

Gold was found in 1855 in what became known as Linton's Diggings, which subsequently became Old Linton's when a new township was built on Surface Hill in 1860. This was the beginning of the town we know today as Linton.. Chinese people, among others, mined the local shafts until the gold ran out. The miners remained in the area and set up market gardens. The Post Office opened on 5 November 1857 as Linton's and was renamed Linton around 1860. Much mining equipment can still be found in the Linton district.

The local Grenville Standard newspaper began publication in April 1895, and ran for 2,389 issues, ceasing 25 October 1941. The 1914–1918 years of the newspaper have been digitised as part of the Australian digitised newspapers project.

The ALP politician and Leader of the Federal Opposition 1922–28, Matthew Charlton, was born in Linton in 1866.

In December 1998, five firefighters were killed when they became trapped in a tanker while battling a bushfire near Linton.

== Arts & Culture ==
Edinburgh Reserve is home to the Living Sculptures project. The Living Sculptures are indigenous gardens designed by Wadawurrung Traditional Owners shaped as a Buniya (Eel) and Kadak (Snake).

In 2023, Golden Plains Shire commemorated Linton woman and acclaimed medical practitioner and pediatrician Vera Scantlebury Brown by commissioning a life-sized sculpture of her to be housed on the Avenue of Honour.

== Nature ==
Linton is home to the nearby Clarkesdale Bird Sanctuary which is a nature reserve focused on protecting and restoring habitat for woodland birds.
