= The Richmond River Express Examiner =

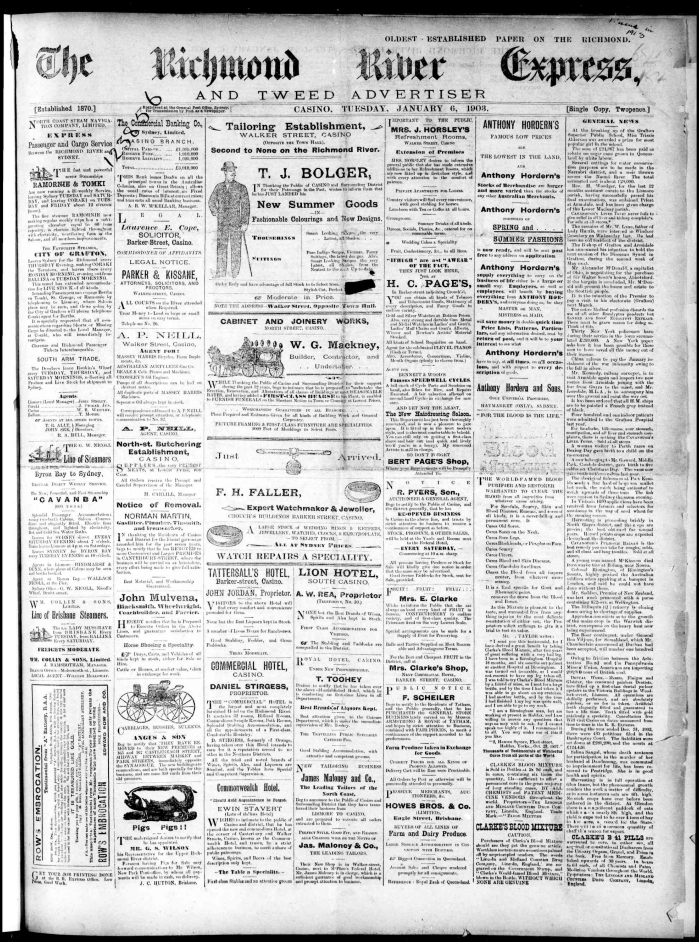
Front cover of The Richmond River Express and Tweed Advertiser on 6 January 1903.

The Richmond River Express Examiner was a weekly newspaper published in Casino, New South Wales, Australia. It has been previously published as The Richmond River Express, The Kyogle Examiner, The Rosolen Press, The Richmond River Express and Casino Kyogle Advertiser and The Richmond River Express and Tweed Advertiser.

== History ==
The Richmond River Express and Tweed Advertiser was Casino's first newspaper and was first published on 23 December 1870 by Robert Gordon Balmer. In 1904 the name was changed to The Richmond River Express and Casino Kyogle Advertiser which was shortened to The Richmond River Express in 1929. The Express was published as a daily from 1929 to 1955 when a fire destroyed the printing plant. In April 1943, The Walcha News reported that the Richmond River Express, Casino, after being the oldest North Coast paper covering the previous 73 years, had ceased publication. The editor had noted that this was due to wartime regulations rather than lack of local support.

In 1978 the Express merged with The Kyogle Examiner and became The Richmond River Express Examiner. The Examiner is currently published by The Northern Star. The current editor is Susanna Freymark.

== Digitisation ==
The paper has been digitised as part of the Australian Newspapers Digitisation Program project of the National Library of Australia.

== See also ==
- List of newspapers in Australia
- List of newspapers in New South Wales
