= Pikeman's dog =

Dog present at the Battle of the Eureka Stockade

During the Battle of the Eureka Stockade, there was a dog that remained at the side of one of the pikemen and even followed his dead body to the cemetery. Christopher Crook, who was a correspondent for the Geelong Advertiser, is quoted in William Wither's A History of Ballarat as saying:

A little terrier sat on the breast of the man I spoke of, and kept a continuous howl; it was removed, but always returned to the same spot, and when the miner's body was huddled, with the other corpses, into the cart, the little dog jumped in after him, and lying on his dead master's breast, began howling again.

The pikeman may have been William Emmerman or Edward Thonen. Eurekapedia references an unpublished diary that refers to Emmermann as the owner of the Pikeman's dog, although Peter Lalor said it may have belonged to Thonen. James Graham Smith's account suggests the dog belonged to Thonen, stating:

Police Constable Coulson, my shipmate, was expelling the faithful little dog and when I remonstrated with him for doing so he said, 'What do you think of your work, Smith?' .... I ... went into the hut where Thonen, the blacksmith, who made the pikes for the insurgents, lay dying with the late Dr Hobbson [sic] moistening the lips of the victim of a short sighted government.

== Awards and memorials ==
The Pikeman's dog was the fourth animal to be awarded the Purple Cross Award, named after the Purple Cross Society, founded by veterinarians during the First World War to care for horses. Administered by the RSPCA, the award recognises animals that have overcome their natural fear and instincts for self-preservation to assist humans. There was a ceremony that took place at the Art Gallery of Ballarat on 30 November 1997 where Detective Sergeant Peter Lalor, great-great-grandson of Peter Lalor, accepted the award on behalf of the Eureka trust with the "King" fragments of the Eureka Flag as the background.

There is also a life-size bronze sculpture of the Pikeman's dog that was unveiled in the courtyard of the interpretative centre at Eureka Stockade Memorial Park on 5 December 1999 in a ceremony that was attended by the Victorian premier Steve Bracks, former prime minister Gough Whitlam, and the Irish ambassador Richard O'Brien.

== See also ==
- Battle of the Eureka Stockade

== Bibliography ==
- Corfield, Justin; Wickham, Dorothy; Gervasoni, Clare (2004). The Eureka Encyclopedia. Ballarat: Ballarat Heritage Services. ISBN 978-1-87-647861-2.
