= The Kyogle Examiner =

Former English language newspaper

Front page of the Kyogle Examiner, 6 January 1912.

The Kyogle Examiner was an English language newspaper, published from 1905 in Kyogle, New South Wales, Australia.

== History ==
The first edition of the paper was published in December 1905. The paper was issued in twice weekly, Wednesday and Saturday editions, until 1971. After this time, the paper was issued weekly, until 1978. The paper was circulated throughout the Kyogle and Upper Richmond district, and early editions of the paper were issued with the subtitle "and Upper Richmond Advocate". The first proprietor of the paper was Ernest Lloyd Vincent, who owned the paper until 1935. In 1978, the paper was absorbed into the Richmond River Express Examiner, which is now published as The Northern Star, in Lismore, New South Wales.

== Digitisation ==
The Kyogle Examiner has been digitised as part of the Australian Newspapers Digitisation Program of the National Library of Australia.

== See also ==
- List of newspapers in New South Wales
