= Thaddeus Welch =

American landscape painter (1844–1919)

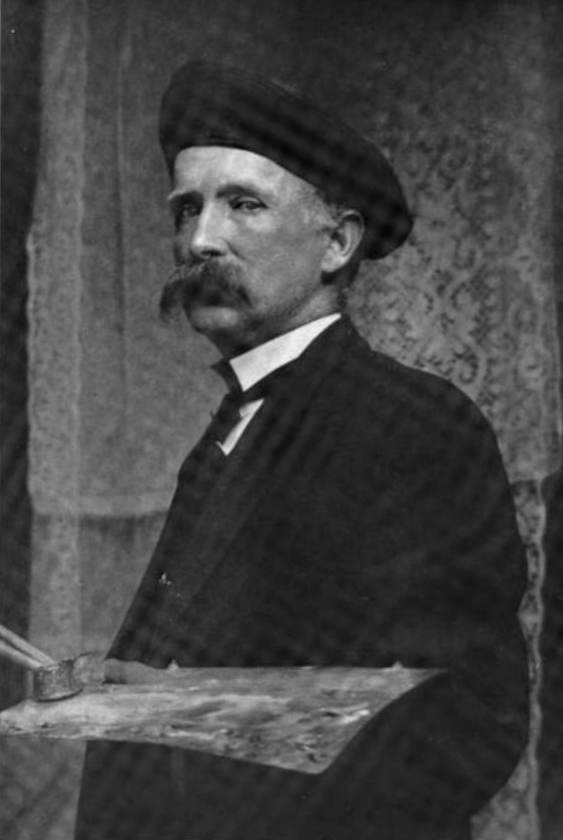
- Born: July 14, 1844; La Porte, Indiana
- Died: December 19, 1919 (aged 75); Santa Barbara, California, U.S.
- Occupation: Painter
- Spouse: Ludmilla Pilat Welch

Thaddeus Welch (July 14, 1844 – December 19, 1919) was an American landscape painter. Born in Missouri and reared in Oregon, he was trained at the Royal Academy in Munich, Germany. His paintings of Marin County, California became popular among members of the Bohemian Club in the 1890s. He retired in Santa Barbara, California with his wife, Ludmilla, who was also a painter. In his obituary in The San Francisco Chronicle, he was called "one of the greatest interpretative painters of California."
