= Samuel Griffith Society =

Australian conservative legal organization

The Samuel Griffith Society
- Established: 1992
- Executive Director: Mia Schlicht
- Website: www.samuelgriffith.org

The Samuel Griffith Society is an Australian conservative legal organisation founded in 1992 by a group led by former Chief Justice of Australia Sir Harry Gibbs, former Senator John Stone, businessman Hugh Morgan and legal academic Greg Craven. Named after Sir Samuel Griffith, one of the architects of the Australian Constitution, the society describes its aims as being: "to undertake and support research into [Australia's] constitutional arrangements, to encourage and promote widespread debate about the benefits of federalism, and to defend the present Constitution." It holds annual conferences, runs an annual national constitutional law essay competition and publishes an annual journal of conference proceedings entitled "Upholding the Australian Constitution".

It is one of a number of groups including the H. R. Nicholls Society, Bennelong Society and Lavoisier Group, that were promoted by Australian business leader and political activist Ray Evans.

== Aims and objectives ==
- To oppose the further centralisation of power in Canberra.
- To restore the authority of Parliament as against that of the Executive.
- To defend the independence of the Judiciary.
- To foster and support any reforms of Australia's constitutional arrangements which would help achieve these objectives.
- To promote discussion on constitutional matters to establish a clear position in support of the decentralisation of government power.
- To encourage a wider understanding throughout the community of the Constitution and the nation's achievement under it.

The Society's aims have been described by author Dominic Kelly as to pursue "a renewed federalism" and to oppose "the Mabo judgment and the proposed Australian republic."

== Current activities ==
The Samuel Griffith Society has held more than thirty conferences since 1992. Recent conference speakers have included former Prime Minister Tony Abbott, Chief Justice Susan Kiefel, Senator Amanda Stoker and Senator James Paterson. Conference discussion topics have included the Mabo decision, Australia remaining a constitutional monarchy, the possible introduction of a Bill of rights and the controversial section 18C of the Racial Discrimination Act.

In 2019, the Society was granted deductible gift recipient status. This was soon followed by the appointment of the Society's first full-time Executive Director.

According to James Allan: "The Society's members remain stalwart supporters of federalism, in line with the clear and unmistakable intentions of those who drafted our Constitution and worked to see it ratified, and despite the truly abysmal track record of our High Court in federalism disputes since 1920." In recent times, the Society has spoken out against the High Court's decision in Love v Commonwealth. In October 2021, Executive Director Xavier Boffa called for the decision to be reconsidered, describing it as "quite a surprise to many in the legal community, introducing a controversial new notion of nationality detached from birth or naturalisation".

The Society has been described as "a temperamentally conservative body concerned with dry constitutional matters." In 2021, the Society's decision to invite controversial One Nation MP Mark Latham to speak at its 32nd conference was derided for failing "to mention his current political party, or the decade he spent representing Labor in Federal Parliament". It has also been linked to conservative efforts to influence judicial appointments in Australia, including the appointment of Justice Simon Steward to the High Court of Australia.

== See also ==
- H. R. Nicholls Society
- Bennelong Society
- Lavoisier Group
