= Racism and the Eureka Rebellion =

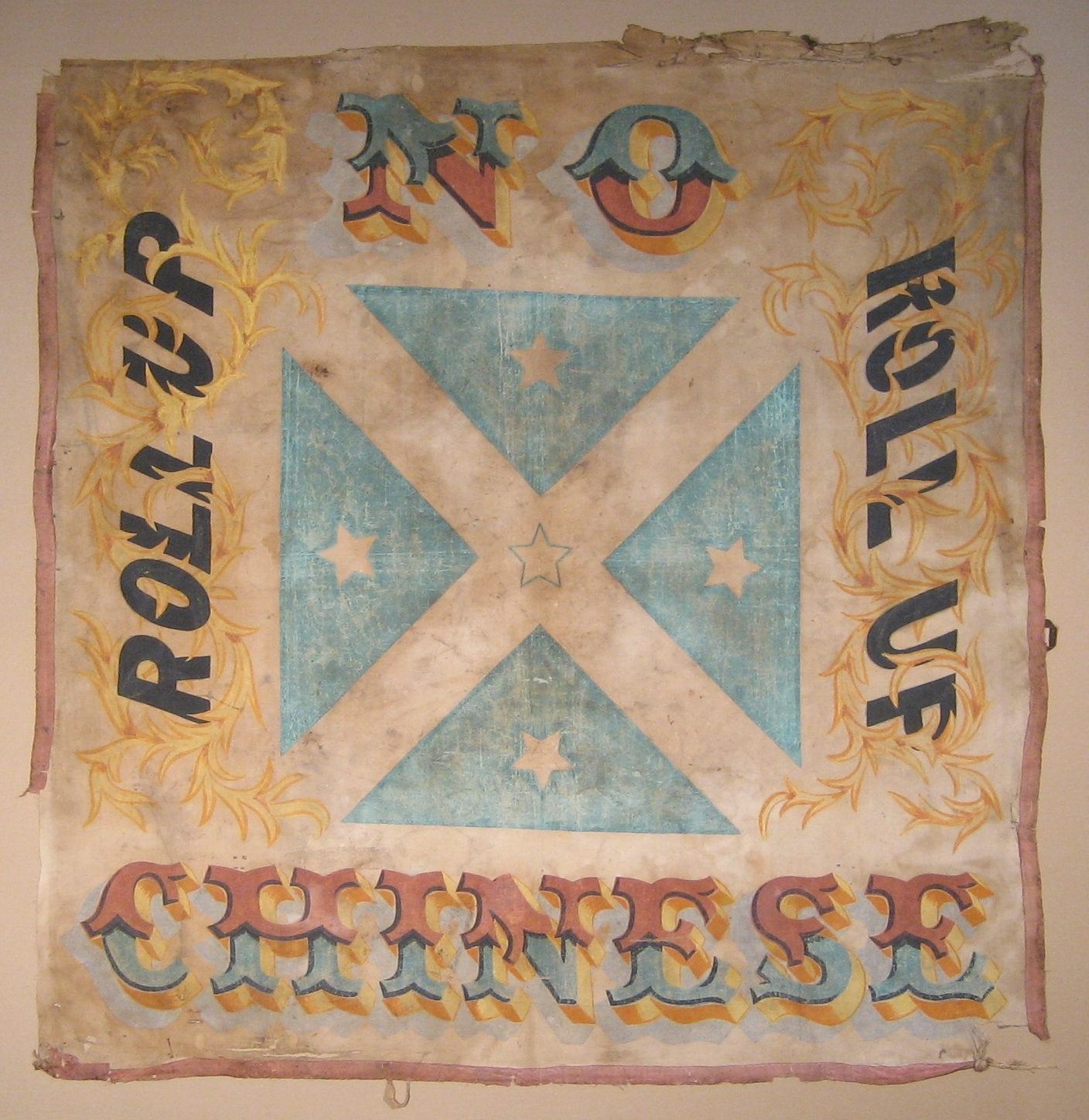
The Roll Up Banner was devised during the Lambing Flat riots in 1861

White nationalists in Australia recall the Eureka Rebellion and the eventual implementation of Victoria's Chinese poll tax in 1855 as a milestone in the formation of the 1901 Immigration Restriction Act that enshrined the White Australia Policy of the 20th century. The Eureka Flag is often featured on bumper stickers with white nationalist political slogans, and the Australia First Party has incorporated it into their official logo. Many, including Peter FitzSimons, have criticised such use by "those who ludicrously brandish it as a symbol of white Australia". However, the Lambing Flat banner that features the Southern Cross superimposed over a Saint Andrew's cross with the inscription "ROLL UP. ROLL UP. NO CHINESE". It has been claimed that the banner, which served as an advertisement for a public meeting held prior to the Lambing Flat riots, was inspired by the Eureka Flag. Nationalists have also maintained an oral tradition where the Eureka Flag was seen again on display outside NSW parliament house in 1878 at a protest brought about by the use of Chinese labour on ships at Circular Quay. Another flag similar to the Eureka Flag was seen prominently flown over a camp during the 1894 Australian shearers' strike at Barcaldine, Queensland.

== Victorian colonial attitudes towards the Chinese ==
Numerous authors have mentioned the antipathy of the European miners towards the presence of Asiatics on the goldfields, including Russel Ward, who has noted: "The Chinese ... were conspicuous by their absence at Eureka".

Marjorie Barnard, in her short history of Australia, says that the trouble began in 1853 when the Chinese began to arrive, many of whom "were coolies sent by their masters at a low wage to mine in Australia. All the gold they won went out of the country. Their industry, their frugal habit of life, their unwillingness to take any part in the community, all offended the diggers. They accused them of immortality, of wasting water, of making no contribution to the common weal".

C.N. Connelly has observed that "While the Chinese remained almost as rare as Maoris and Negroes, they had little trouble. When they began to assemble in large groups... attitudes changed".

Weston Bate stated that:

Of all foreigners on the Victorian goldfields, none were as quaint, as numerous or as self-contained as the Chinese. And none posed as great a social problem ... Of the fervour of Australian nationalism and the social aspirations which had brought Europeans in quest of gold they were ignorant ... Because they came en masse as assisted migrants into an alien culture, the Chinese tended to live and work together and, mostly having been bonded in China to work in parties of ten or so for Chinese merchants, they lacked conspicuously the individualism of Westerners ... They had crowded together at Ballarat by March 1854, over a year before official moves were made to segregated them ... Few could speak English - and even fewer Englishmen understood Chinese ... they were a threat to the independence of the diggers; they moved in swarms across old workings that Europeans reserved for bad times ... They also offended by washing for gold at waterholes set aside by general agreement for domestic purposes. Their overwhelming numbers and the way they drew upon their national tradition as irrigators meant that they were anyway large users of water ... Numbers alone made the Chinese a formidable economic and social threat.

In his local history of Ballarat William Withers has stated: "The Chinese were detested as an inferior race, as the harbingers of degrading pagan immorality, and as alien competitors for the bread which the miners required for themselves and families."

== Commission of Inquiry report and the Chinese poll tax ==
In the aftermath of the Battle of the Eureka Stockade, the final report of the Victorian Goldfields Commission was presented to Lieutenant Governor Charles Hotham on 27 March 1855. Concerning the tensions caused by the presence of Chinese miners on the goldfields, the report states inter alia:

A most serious social question with reference to the gold-fields, and one that has lately crept on with rapid but almost unobserved steps, is with reference to the great number of the Chinese. This number, although already almost incredible, yet appears to be still fast increasing ... The question of the influx of such large numbers of a pagan and inferior race is a very serious one ... The statement of one of this people, that "all" were coming, comprises an unpleasant possibility of the future, that a comparative handful of colonists may be buried in a countless throng of Chinamen ... some step is here necessary, if not to prohibit, at least to check and diminish this influx.

The legislative remedy came in the form of a poll tax, assented to on 12 June 1855, made payable by Chinese immigrants.

== See also ==
- Eureka Rebellion
- White Australia Policy
- Australia First Party

== Bibliography ==
- Anderson, Hugh, ed. (1978). Report from the Commission Appointed to Inquire into the Condition of the Goldfields. Melbourne: Red Rooster Press. ISBN 0-9596490-1-8.
- Barnard, Marjorie (1962). A History of Australia. Sydney: Angus and Robertson.
- Bate, Weston (1978). Lucky City, The First Generation at Ballarat, 1851–1901. Carlton: Melbourne University Press. ISBN 978-0-52-284157-2.
- Cayley, Frank (1966). Flag of Stars. Adelaide: Rigby. ISBN 978-9-04-010451-0.
- Connelly, C.N. (1978). 'Miners' Rights, Who Are Our Enemies?: Racism and the Working Class in Australia'. Neutral Bay: Hale and Ironmonger.
- FitzSimons, Peter (2012). Eureka: The Unfinished Revolution. Sydney: Random House Australia. ISBN 978-1-74-275525-0.
- Gold, Geoffrey (1977). Eureka: Rebellion Beneath the Southern Cross. Adelaide: Rigby. ISBN 978-0-72-700256-3.
- Kieza, Grantlee (2014). Sons of the Southern Cross. Sydney: HarperCollins. ISBN 978-0-73-333156-5.
- Smith, Whitney (1975a). Flags Through the Ages and Across the World. Maidenhead: McGraw-Hill. ISBN 978-0-07-059093-9.
- Ward, Russel (1979). Australia: A short history. Sydney: Ure Smith. ISBN 978-0-72-540473-4.
- Withers, William (1999). History of Ballarat and Some Ballarat Reminiscences. Ballarat: Ballarat Heritage Service. ISBN 978-1-87-647878-0.
