= Bibliography of the Eureka Rebellion =

Notable sources concerning the Eureka Rebellion

The following bibliography includes notable sources concerning the Eureka Rebellion. This article is currently being expanded and revised.

== Bibliography ==
=== Historiography ===
==== General histories ====
- Barnard, Marjorie (1962). A History of Australia. Sydney: Angus and Robertson.
- Blainey, Geoffrey (1983). A Land Half Won. Melbourne: Sun Books. ISBN 0-7251-0411-2.
- Clark, Manning (1987). A History of Australia. Vol. IV: The Earth Abideth Forever 1851-1888. Carlton: Melbourne University Press. ISBN 9780522841473.
- Clark, Manning, A Short History of Australia (MacMillan, Melbourne, reprinted illustrated 2nd edition, 1982).
- Lewis, Wendy; Balderstone, Simon; Bowman, John (2006). Events That Shaped Australia. Wahroonga: New Holland. ISBN 978-1-74110-492-9.
- Ward, Russel, Australia: A short history (Ure Smith, Sydney, 1979).

==== Surveys of the period ====
- Blee, Jill (2010). Eureka: The Story of Australia's Most Famous Rebellion. Gosford: Exisle Publishing. ISBN 978-1-92-149776-6.
- Broome, Richard (1984). The Victorians: Arriving. McMahons Point: Syme & Weldon Associates. ISBN 0-9492-8801-2.
- Goodman, David, Gold Seeking: Victoria and California in the 1850s, Allen & Unwin, 1994.
- Keesing, Nancy, History of the Australian Goldrushes, Lloyd O’Neil Pty. Ltd. 1971.
- O'Brien, Bob (1992). Massacre at Eureka: The untold story. Kew: Australian Scholarly Publishing. ISBN 978-1-87-560604-7.
- Parry, Ann (2007). Riots, Robberies and Rebellions. South Yarra: Macmillan Education. ISBN 978-1-42-020516-9.
- Serle, Geoffrey (1963). The Golden Age: A History of the Colony of Victoria, 1851-1861. Melbourne: Melbourne University Press. ISBN 978-0-52-284143-5.
- Bert and Bon Strange, Eureka: Gold Graft and Grievances, B&B Strange, Ballarat, 1973.
- Sunter, Anne Beggs and Livingston, Kevin (eds) The Legacy of Eureka; Past, Present and Future. Ballarat, Australian Studies Centre, University of Ballarat, 1998.
- Wickham, Dorothy, Eureka, BHS Publishing, 2014.

==== Local histories ====
- Bate, Weston (1978). Lucky City, The First Generation at Ballarat, 1851–1901. Carlton: Melbourne University Press. ISBN 978-0-52-284157-2.
- Stacpoole, H.J., Gold at Ballarat: The Ballarat East Goldfield Its Discovery and Development, Lowden Publishing Co., 1971.
- Strange, W, Ballarat, A Brief History, Lowden Publishing Co., 1971.
- Withers, William (1999). History of Ballarat and Some Ballarat Reminiscences. Ballarat: Ballarat Heritage Service. ISBN 978-1-87-647878-0.

==== Popular histories ====
===== Pictorial histories =====
- Hocking, Geoff (2004). Eureka Stockade a pictorial history: the events leading to the attack in the pre-dawn of 3 December 1854. Rowville: Five Mile Press. ISBN 1-7412-4426-9.
- Wenban, Ray (1958). The Revolt at Eureka. Pictorial Social Studies. Vol. 16. Sydney: Australian Visual Education.

===== Narrative histories =====
- FitzSimons, Peter (2012). Eureka: The Unfinished Revolution. Sydney: Random House Australia. ISBN 978-1-74-275525-0.
- Kieza, Grantlee (2014). Sons of the Southern Cross. Sydney: HarperCollins. ISBN 978-0-73-333156-5.

==== Military histories ====
- Blake, Gregory (2012). Eureka Stockade: A ferocious and bloody battle. Newport: Big Sky Publishing. ISBN 978-1-92-213204-8.
- Blake, Gregory (2009). To Pierce the Tyrant's Heart: The Battle for the Eureka Stockade. Loftus, ACT: Australian Army History Unit. ISBN 978-0-98-047532-6.

==== Social histories ====
- Connelly, C.N., Miners' Rights, Who Are Our Enemies?: Racism and the Working Class in Australia, (Hale and Ironmonger, Neutral Bay, 1978).
- Currey, C.H. (1954). The Irish at Eureka. Sydney: Angus and Robertson.
- Inglis, Ken (2015). The Australian Colonists: An Exploration of Social History, 1788-1870. Melbourne: Melbourne University Publishing. ISBN 978-1-42-020516-9.
- Potts, E. Daniel & Potts Annette, 'American Republicanism and Disturbances on the Victorian Goldfields' (1968) Vol. 13, No. 50: pp. 145–164 Historical Studies.
- Potts, Daniel; Potts, Annette (1974). Young America and Australian Gold. St Lucia: University of Queensland Press. ISBN 0-7022-0894-9.

==== Political histories ====
- Gold, Geoffrey (1977). Eureka: Rebellion Beneath the Southern Cross. Adelaide: Rigby. ISBN 978-0-72-700256-3.
- Molony, John (1984). Eureka. Ringwood: Viking. ISBN 978-0-67-080085-8.
- Ross, R.S. (1914). Freedom's Fight of '54. Fraser and Jenkinson.
- Spence, W.G. (1909). Australia's Awakening. Sydney and Melbourne: The Worker Trustees.
- Walshe, R. D., The Eureka Stockade, 1854-1954 (Current Book Distributors, Sydney, 1954).

==== Feminist histories ====
- Wickham, Dorothy, Eureka's Women, BHS Publishing, 2014.
- Wickham, Dorothy, Women of the Diggings: Ballarat 1854, BHS Publishing, 2009.
- Wright, Clare (2013). The Forgotten Rebels of Eureka. Melbourne: Text Publishing. ISBN 978-1-92214-737-0.

==== Other specialised studies ====
- Blainey, Geoffrey (1963). The Rush That Never Ended: A history of Australian mining. Melbourne: Melbourne University Press.
- Gervasoni, Clare, Outbreak at Ballarat, BHS Publishing, 1998.
- Gervasoni & Wickham, Among the Diggers, BHS Publishing, 1999.
- Darlington, Robert (1983). Eric Campbell and the New Guard. Sydney: Kangaroo Press. ISBN 978-0-94-992434-6.
- Gervasoni, Clare, Outbreak at Ballarat: Eureka from the Mount Alexander Mail.
- Oddie, James (1904), From Tent to Parliament: The Life of Peter Lalor and his Coadjutors, and History of the Eureka Stockade (Second Edition), Ballarat: Berry, Anderson & Co.
- Sidney, Samuel, The Three Colonies of Australia, NSW, Victoria, South Australia, Their Pastures, Copper Mines and Gold Fields, Ingram. Cooke & Co, London, 1852.
- Stanley, Peter, The Remote Garrison, The British Army in Australia, Kangaroo Press, 1986.
- Stoljar, Jeremy (2011). The Australian Book of Great Trials: The Cases That Shaped a Nation. Millers Point: Murdoch Books. ISBN 978-1-74-266131-5.
- Wickham, Dorothy (1996). Deaths at Eureka. Ballarat: The Author. ISBN 0-646-30283-3.
- Wickham, Dorothy, Shot in the Dark, BHS Publishing, 1998.
- Wickham, Dorothy, St Alipus: Ballarat's First Church, self-published, 1997.

==== Commemorative publications ====
- Rich, Margaret (ed), Eureka: The event and its continuing impact on the nation (Ballarat Fine Art Gallery, Ballarat, 1994).

=== Biography ===
- Blake, Les (1979). Peter Lalor: the man from Eureka. Belmont: Neptune Press. ISBN 978-0-90-913140-1.
- O'Grady, Desmond, Raffaello! Raffaello!: A Biography of Raffaello Carboni (Hale and Iremonger, Sydney, 1985).
- O'Grady, Desmond, Stages of Revolution: A biography of the Eureka Stockade's Raffaello Carboni (Hardie Grant Books, Prahan, 2004).
- Bamberger, Daniel; Young, Anne, Edward Thonen. A forgotten Eureka rebel. Zeitgeschichtliche Sammlung, Zentrum für Stadtgeschichte und Industriekultur (Wuppertal, 2023).
- Potts, Daniel; Potts, Annette (1970). A Yankee Merchant in Goldrush Australia: The Letters of George Francis Train 1853-55. Melbourne: William Heinemann. ISBN 978-0-85-561010-4.
- Turnbull, Clive (1965). Australian Lives, Bonanza: The Story of George Francis Train. Melbourne: F.W. Cheshire.
- Turnbull, Clive (1946). Eureka: The Story of Peter Lalor. Melbourne: Hawthorne Press.

=== Battlefield archaeology ===
- Harvey, Jack (1994). Eureka Rediscovered: In search of the site of the historic stockade. Ballarat: University of Ballarat. ISBN 978-0-90-802664-7.
- Harvey, J. T. (May 2003). "Locating the Eureka Stockade: Use of a Geographical Information System (GIS) in a Historiographical Research Context". Computers and the Humanities. 37 (2): 229–234. doi:10.1023/A:1022617505636. hdl:1959.17/45170. JSTOR 30204893. S2CID 41012673.

=== Vexillology ===
- Australian Flags (3rd ed.). Canberra: Australian Government Publishing Service. 2006. ISBN 0-642-47134-7.
- Cayley, Frank (1966). Flag of Stars. Adelaide: Rigby. ISBN 978-9-04-010451-0.
- Fox, Len (1973). Eureka and its flag. Canterbury, Victoria: Mullaya Publications. ISBN 978-0-85-914004-1.
- Fox, Len (1992). The Eureka Flag. Potts Point: The Author. ISBN 978-0-95-892395-8.
- Fox, Len (1963). The strange story of the Eureka flag. Darlinghurst: The Author.
- Kwan, Elizabeth (2006). Flag and Nation: Australians and their National Flags since 1901. Sydney: University of New South Wales. ISBN 0-86840-567-1.
- Smith, Whitney (1975a). Flags Through the Ages and Across the World. Maidenhead: McGraw-Hill. ISBN 978-0-07-059093-9.
- Smith, Whitney (1975b). The Flag Book of the United States: The Story of the Stars and Stripes and the Flags of the Fifty States. New York: William Morrow. ISBN 978-0-68-802977-7.
- Wickham, Dorothy; Gervasoni, Clare; D'Angri, Val (2000). The Eureka Flag: Our Starry Banner. Ballarat: Ballarat Heritage Services. ISBN 978-1-87-647813-1.

=== Primary sources ===
==== Memoirs ====
- Carboni, Raffaello (1855). The Eureka Stockade: The Consequence of Some Pirates Wanting a Quarterdeck Rebellion. Melbourne: J. P. Atkinson and Co. – via Project Gutenberg.
- Craig, William (1903). My Adventures on the Australian Goldfields. London: Cassell and Company.
- Ferguson, Charles (1979). The Experiences of a Forty-Niner in Australia and New Zealand. Melbourne: Gaston Renard. ISBN 978-0-95-998994-6.
- Huyghue, Samuel Douglas Smyth The Ballarat Riots, 1854 held at the Mitchell Library, Sydney.
- Lynch, John (1940). Story of the Eureka Stockade: Epic Days of the Early Fifties at Ballarat (Reprint ed.). Melbourne: Australian Catholic Truth Society.
- Nicholls, H.R (May 1890). Reminiscences of the Eureka Stockade. The Centennial Magazine: An Australian Monthly. II: August 1889 to July 1890 (available in an annual compilation).
- R.E. Johns Papers, MS10075, Manuscript Collection, La Trobe Library, State Library of Victoria.
- Train, George (1902). My Life in Many States and in Foreign Lands. London: William Heinemann.
- Twain, Mark (1925). Following the Equator. New York: Harper and Brothers.
- Wilson, John W. (1963). The Starry Banner of Australia: An Episode in Colonial History. Brisbane: Brian Donaghey.

==== Diaries ====
- Evans, Charles, diary, 24 September 1853 – 21 January 1855, SLV, MS 11484, Box 1777/4.
- Pierson, Thomas, diary, SLV, MS 11646, Box 2178/4-5.
- Taylor, Theophilus, diary, 23 September 1853 – 1 August 1856, Ballarat Genealogy Society.

==== Letters ====
- Pasley, Charles: 1855, Letter to his father. FM 3/359 B1564 6-46A, Mitchell Library, State Library of New South Wales.
- Smyth, Patrick: 13 December 1854, Ballarat. Letter to William Henry Archer, Melbourne Diocesan Historical Commission.
- Wilson, John: 1856, Letter from Mt. Egerton. ML DOC 2771 6-660c, Mitchell Library, State Library of New South Wales.

==== Affidavits ====
- King, Hugh (7 December 1854). "Deposition of Witness: Hugh King". Archived from the original on 12 November 2013 – via Public Record Office Victoria.

==== Official reports ====
- Anderson, Hugh, ed. (1978). Report from the Commission Appointed to Inquire into the Condition of the Goldfields. Melbourne: Red Rooster Press. ISBN 0-9596490-1-8.
- Thomas, John Wellesley (3 December 1854). Captain Thomas reports on the attack on the Eureka Stockade to the Major Adjutant General (Report). Archived from the original on 4 April 2019 – via Public Record Office Victoria.
- Thomas, John Wellesley (14 December 1854). Capt. Thomas' report - Flag captured (Report). Colonial Secretary's Office. Archived from the original on 12 April 2019 – via Public Record Office Victoria.
- Three Despatches From Sir Charles Hotham. Melbourne: Public Record Office. 1978. ISBN 978-0-72-411706-2.

==== Other contemporaneous reports ====
===== The Argus =====
- The Argus, 19 August 1853, 4.
- "ARRIVAL OF THE QUEEN OF THE SOUTH". The Argus. Melbourne. 22 June 1854. p. 4 – via Trove.
- "By Express. Fatal Collision at Ballaarat". The Argus. Melbourne. 4 December 1854. p. 5 – via Trove.
- "GEELONG. (FROM OUR OWN CORRESPONDENT.)". The Argus. Melbourne. 5 December 1854. p. 4 – via Trove.
- "DEFENCE OF THE CITY". The Argus. Melbourne. 6 December 1854. p. 7 – via Trove.
- "MEETING FOR THE PROTECTION OF CONSTITUTIONAL LIBERTY". The Argus. Melbourne. 7 December 1854. p. 5 – via Trove.
- "BALLAARAT". The Argus. Melbourne. 9 December 1854. p. 5 – via Trove.
- "DISCONTENT AT THE GOLD-FIELDS.— APPOINTMENT OF A COMMISSION OF INQUIRY". The Argus. Melbourne. 9 December 1854. p. 5 – via Trove.
- "TO THE COLONISTS OF VICTORIA". The Argus. Melbourne. 10 April 1855. p. 7 – via Trove.
- "POLICE IN SERIOUS CLASH WITH STRIKERS: Battle over Eureka flag". The Argus. Melbourne. 18 March 1948. p. 3 – via Trove.

===== The Age =====
- "AFFAIRS AT BALLARAT". The Age. Melbourne. 28 November 1854. p. 5 – via Trove.
- "BALLARAT. (From the Correspondent of the Geelong Advertiser.)". The Age. Melbourne. 4 December 1854. p. 5 – via Trove.

===== The Geelong Advertiser and Intelligencer =====
- Geelong Advertiser, 2 December 1854, 4.
- "THE EUREKA MASSACRE". Geelong Advertiser and Intelligencer. Geelong. 6 December 1854. p. 4 – via Trove.

===== The Sydney Morning Herald =====
- "CONTINUATION OF THE STATE TRIALS". The Sydney Morning Herald. Sydney. 5 March 1855. p. 3 – via Trove.

===== The Kyogle Examiner =====
- "EUREKA STOCKADE RECALLED: William Edward Atherdon, (96)". The Kyogle Examiner. Kyogle. 29 May 1934. p. 3 – via Trove.

===== Daily Mercury =====
- "LAST SURVIVOR OF EUREKA STOCKADE". Daily Mercury. Mackay. 15 May 1934. p. 6 – via Trove.

==== Legislation ====
- An Act for the Better Government of Her Majesty's Australian Colonies 1850 (UK).
- The Victoria Electoral Act of 1851 No 3a (NSW).
- An Act to extend the Elective Franchise 1854 (Vic).
- An Act for granting duties of Customs upon Gold exported from Victoria 1855 (Vic).
- An Act to make provision for certain Immigrants 1855 (Vic).
- Victoria Constitution Act 1855 (UK).
- Legislative Council Reform Act 1950 (Vic).

==== Proclamations ====
- Supplement to the Victorian Government Gazette, No 6, 13 August 1851, 209.
- Victorian Government Gazette, No. 8, 27 August 1851, 307.
- Victorian Government Gazette, No 22, 3 December 1851, 825.
- Victorian Government Gazette, No 25, 24 December 1851, 871.

==== Cases ====
- The Queen v Joseph (Supreme Court of Victoria 1855), Text.
- The Queen v Hayes (Supreme Court of Victoria 1855), Text.

==== Other documents ====
- Ballarat Reform League Charter, 11 November 1854, VPRS 4066/P Unit 1, November no. 69, VA 466 Governor (including Lieutenant Governor 1851–1855 and Governor's Office), Public Record Office Victoria.

=== Reference Books ===
- Australian Dictionary of Biography Vol 5: 1851-1890, K-Q. Carlton: Melbourne University Press. 1974. ISBN 978-0-52-284061-2.
- Australian Encyclopaedia Volume Four ELE-GIB (4th ed.). Sydney: Grolier Society. 1983. ISBN 978-0-95-966042-5.
- Corfield, Justin; Wickham, Dorothy; Gervasoni, Clare (2004). The Eureka Encyclopedia. Ballarat: Ballarat Heritage Services. ISBN 978-1-87-647861-2.
- MacFarlane, Ian (1995). Eureka from the Official Records. Melbourne: Public Record Office Victoria. ISBN 978-0-73-066011-8.
- The International Encyclopedia of Revolution and Protest, London, Blackwell Publishing, 2009.

=== Journals ===
- Beggs-Sunter, Anne (2008). "Eureka; Gathering 'the Oppressed of All Nations'". Journal of Australian Colonial History. 10 (1): 15–34.
- Blainey, Geoffrey (2008). "Introduction". Journal of Australian Colonial History. 10 (1): 1–14.
- Historical Studies: Eureka Supplement (2nd ed.). Melbourne: Melbourne University Press. 1965.

=== Historical magazines ===
- Ross, C. Stuart (July 1919). "Two American Types that left their Stamp on Victorian History". The Victorian Historical Magazine. Melbourne.
- "The Defence of the Eureka Stockade". Look and Learn. London: Fleetway Publications Ltd. 14 February 1970.

=== Other media reports ===
- John Bailey, 'Flagging the truth,' The Sunday Age, 8 January 2012, Extra, p. 13.
- Jo Roberts, 'The art of the uprising,' The Age, 29 November 2004, A3, p. 7.
- John Huxley, 'Birth of a notion,' Sydney Morning Herald Weekend Edition, 27–28 November 2004, p. 34.
- James Button, 'Children of rebellion maintain the rage,' The Age, 27 November 2004, pp. 1, 10.

==== Book reviews ====
- 'Book pushes Eureka as new Independence Day,' The Courier, 15 July 2004.
- Raise the Standard, Sydney Morning Herald, 5 January 2013 <https://www.smh.com.au/entertainment/books/raise-the-standard-20130104-2c8fn.html>.

==== Eureka commemorations ====
- Best, Catherine, 'Flag should move to Eureka Centre,' The Courier, 13 May 2004 <http://www.thecourier.com.au/story/578530/flag-should-move-to-eureka-centre-report>.
- Bottams, Tim (2 June 2022). "Eureka's new memorial walk revealed". Ballarat Times. Ballarat.
- 'Eureka Day in Jeopardy,' The Courier, 31 August 2004, p. 1-2.
- Henderson, Fiona (23 December 2014). "Reward offered for evidence of battle's Union Jack flag". The Courier. Ballarat. p. 5.
- 'Latham says he'll fly Eureka flag at parliament,' The Courier, 15 July 2004.
- Murphy, Matthew, 'Time's up at last for railway landmark,' The Age, 14 December 2005, p. 13.
- 'New structure proposed for Eureka Centre,' The Courier, 9 May 2011 <http://www.thecourier.com.au/story/556730/new-structure-proposed-for-eureka-centre>
- 'Revamp upgrades Eureka story,' The Courier, 4 June 2003 <http://www.thecourier.com.au/story/331240/revamp-upgrades-eureka-story?>

==== Opinion pieces ====
- Cassin, Ray 'Eureka flag: appropriated or not, it's appropriate,' The Sunday Age, 16 December 2001.
- MacGregor Duncan, Andrew Leigh, Peter Tynan, 'Time to reclaim this legend as our driving force,' Sydney Morning Herald, 29 November 2004, p. 15 <https://www.smh.com.au/national/time-to-reclaim-this-legend-as-our-driving-force-20041129-gdk7jk.html>.
- Huxley, John (26 January 2016). "Eureka? An answer to that Jack in the corner gets a little bit warmer". Sydney Morning Herald. Sydney.
- Henderson, Gerard 'Libs should battle for Eureka,' Sydney Morning Herald, 30 November 2004, p. 13.
- Murray, Robert, 'The unromantic truth about the Eureka Stockade,' The Age, 26 December 2003, p. 13.
- Ramsay, Alan, 'Room for all in the stockade, bar one,' 18 December 2004, Sydney Morning Herald, p. 33.
- Sheridan, Greg, 'Army salutes tank order,' The Australian, 17 February 2005, p. 15.

==== Society and culture ====
- Australian Broadcasting Corporation, 'Anderson flags Eureka debate,' ABC news, 10 September 2004 (John Anderson).
- David Ellery, 'Sword of Gallipoli: the mystery and the myth,' Canberra Times, 24 April 2013 <http://www.canberratimes.com.au/act-news/sword-of-gallipoli-the-mystery-and-the-myth-20130424-2if8x.html>.
- Cowie, Tom (22 October 2013). "$10,000 reward to track down 'other' Eureka flag". The Courier. Ballarat. p. 3.
- "Is the Eureka Flag racist? Unley Council rejects request to fly Eureka flag amid racism concerns". News Corp Australia. Sydney. 28 October 2020.

=== Newsletters ===
- Benwell, Phillip, 'Eureka. Be not misled! The Eureka Stockade has nothing to do with a republic or the Labor Party but everything to do with the Ultimate Supremacy of Law and Justice Under the Crown' (2004), Australian Monarchist League.

=== Seminars ===
- Beggs-Sunter, Anne (2004). "Contesting the Flag: the mixed messages of the Eureka Flag". In Mayne, Alan (ed.). Eureka: reappraising an Australian Legend. Paper originally presented at Eureka Seminar, University of Melbourne History Department, 1 December 2004. Perth, Australia: Network Books. pp. 45–60. ISBN 978-1-92-084536-0.
- Beggs-Sunter, Anne (2014). Contesting the making of the Eureka Flag. Australian Historical Association Conference. Brisbane.
- Beggs-Sunter, Anne (November 2004). Eureka; Gathering 'the Oppressed of All Nations'. Eureka Conference. University of Ballarat.

=== Interviews ===
- "Historians discuss Eureka legend". Lateline. 7 May 2001. Australian Broadcasting Corporation.
- "The Eureka Rebellion". 7.30 Report. 14 December 1999. Australian Broadcasting Corporation.

=== Speeches ===
- Eureka: Saga of Australian history. Canberra: Department of Immigration. 1974. ISBN 978-0-64-293997-5.
- Geoffrey Blainey (26 November 2004). Eureka - its many meanings (Speech). 2004 Democracy Conference. University of Ballarat.
- Steve Bracks (26 November 2004). Opening address to Eureka 150 Democracy Conference (Speech). 2004 Democracy Conference. University of Ballarat.

=== Compilations ===
- Clark, Manning, ed. (1966). Sources of Australian History. Melbourne: Oxford University Press.
- Eureka Reminiscences. Ballarat: Ballarat Heritage Service. 1998. ISBN 0-646-35238-5.
- Mayne, Alan (ed), Eureka: reappraising an Australian Legend (Network Books, Perth, 2007).
