= Bennelong (disambiguation) =

Bennelong was a senior Eora Aboriginal man in the Sydney area, at the time of British settlement of Australia in 1788.

Bennelong may also refer to:

- Bennelong Point, New South Wales, a promontory in Sydney, Australia and location of the Sydney Opera House
- Division of Bennelong, an electoral division of the Australian Parliament, located in New South Wales, Australia
- Bennelong Society, a society in Australia dedicated to Aboriginal causes
- Bennelong Medal, a medal given yearly to a person who has aided the Aboriginal cause
- Bennelong Funds Management, an investment management business owned by Jeff Chapman's Bangarra Group
