= Jeff Chapman =

Jeff(rey) or Geoff(rey) Chapman may refer to:

- Jeff Chapman a.k.a. Ninjalicious (1973–2005), Canadian urban explorer and fountaineer
- Jeff Chapman (politician) (born 1959), American state senator
- Jeff Chapman (singer) (born 1969), American Gospel singer
- Jeff Chapman (footballer) (born 1948), Australian rules footballer
- Jeffrey Chapman (lawyer) (born 1958), American attorney
- Geoffrey Chapman (1930–2010), publisher
- Geoff Chapman (rugby union) (born 1939), Australian rugby union player

== See also ==
- Jeffrey Bowyer-Chapman (born 1984), Canadian-American actor and fashion model
