= Timeline of the Eureka Rebellion =

The following is a comprehensive timeline of the Eureka Rebellion.

== 1851 ==
- 1 July 1851: The colony of Victoria separates from New South Wales, as the Port Phillip District gains autonomy as a British colony.
- 8 August 1851: The Geelong Advertiser reports that gold deposits had been discovered outside of Buninyong in central Victoria by Mr Thomas Hiscock.
- 16 August 1851: Lieutenant Governor Charles Joseph Latrobe issues a proclamation providing for a gold mining licence fee of 30 shillings per month, effective 1 September 1851.
- 26 August 1851: In Buninyong, a protest against the new mining tax is attended by 40-50 demonstrators.
- 19-20 September 1851: Dissent was felt across the mining settlements, including at the Ballarat, upon the arrival of gold commissioner D.C. Doveton, but appeals for civil disobedience go unheeded as most prospectors comply with the new mining regulations.
- 1 December 1851: It was announced that the licence fee would be raised from one pound to three pounds a month, effective 1 January 1852.
- 8 December 1851: An anti-mining tax banner is put on public display strung across trees at Forrest Creek.
- 13 December 1851: After remonstrations, particularly in Melbourne and Geelong, the previous mining tax increase was rescinded.
- 15 December 1851: "The Great Meeting of Diggers" takes place in Bendigo as up to 14,000 miners turn out in a massive display of support for repealing the mining tax.

== 1852 ==
- 14 August 1852: An affray breaks out among 150 men over land rights in Bendigo. An inquiry recommends increasing police numbers in the colony's mining settlements. Around this time, the first gold deposits at the Eureka lead in Ballarat are found.
- 2 September 1852: La Trobe receives a petition from the people of Bendigo drawing attention to the need for improvements in the road from Melbourne.
- 2 October 1852: At Lever Flat near Bendigo, the miners would attempt to respond to rising crime levels by forming a "Mutual Protection Association" with a pledge to withhold the licence fee and build detention centres so that nightly armed patrols could begin, with vigilantes dispensing summary justice to those suspected of a crime.
- 23 October 1852: La Trobe receives a petition from Lever Flat, Forrest Creek and Mount Alexander on the subject of policing levels as the colony continues to strain under the weight of the Victorian gold rush.
- 25 November 1852: There was an assault on a police officer by a mob of miners who wrongly believed they were obliged to take out a whole month's subscription for seven days at Oven's field, Bendigo.

== 1853 ==
- 3 February 1853: After a policeman accidentally caused the death of Mr William Guest, assistant commissioner James Clow had to diffuse a difficult situation with a promise to conduct an inquiry into the circumstances, as a group of one thousand angry miners at Reid's Creek overruns the government camp and relieved the constabulary of their sidearms and weapons, and they destroy a cache.
- 11 February 1853: George Black assisted Dr John Owens in chairing a public meeting at Ovens field to protest that the alleged wrongful death of William Guest had not been fully investigated.
- 2 April 1853: Black and Owens again argue in favour of chartism in the colony at a meeting of 800 convened at Ovens Field.
- 6 June 1853: The anti-gold licence association was formed in Bendigo, where a mass petition was launched that attracted 23,000 signatures, including 8,000 from the mining settlement at McIvor.
- 22 June 1853: La Trobe was petitioned for land reform to make it easier to obtain an interest in land adjoining the goldfields in Bendigo.
- 2 July 1853: Police are assaulted in the vicinity of an anti-licence meeting at the Sandhurst gold field in Bendigo with rocks being thrown as they escort an intoxicated miner to the holding cells. The unlawful but peaceful strategy of the Red Ribbon Movement was for supporters to only hand over the agreed sum of only 10 shillings, with the sheer number of protesters in custody causing an administrative meltdown for the colonial authorities.
- 16 July 1853: An anti-licence demonstration in Sandhurst attracted 6000 people where the issue of lack of electoral rights was raised. The high commissioner of the goldfields, William Wright, advised La Trobe of his support for an export duty on gold found rather than the current universal tax on all prospectors based on time stayed.
- 3 August 1853: The Bendigo petition is placed before LaTrobe by delegates Brown, Jones and Thomson.
- 12 August 1853: The Bendigo digger's flag is unfurled at a rally held at View Point, where it was reported there was a multinational display of ethnic and revolutionary flags paraded as a crowd of between 4,000-12,000 demonstrators hear reports from a delegation sent to meet La Trobe.
- 18 August 1853: Ballarat resident commissioner James Clow reported that the rabble-rousing of orators from the Sandhurst diggings had fallen flat at the segregated and multinational Canadian Gully and the Eureka lead.
- 20 August 1853: Just as an angry mob of 500-600 miners went to assemble outside the Government Camp at Waranga, the authorities caved in as a convenient legal technicality was found to release some mining licence evaders. A meeting in Beechworth calls for reducing the licence fee to ten shillings and voting rights for the mining settlements. La Trobe fails to respond to the miner’s July petition by addressing their grievances.
- 21 August 1853: A 20,000-strong crowd was out in force at Hospital Hill, where it was resolved to support a mining tax fee of 10 shillings per month.
- 22 August 1853: At the red ribbon turnout at Waranga, it was resolved to petition the lieutenant governor for a licence renewal fee set at 10 shillings.
- 27 August 1853: A second multinational-style gathering is held at View Point, and a mining tax protest in Castlemaine draws 300. The Red Ribbon movement grew as miners started placing them in their hats as a symbol of protest.
- 28 August 1853: At Sandhurst, a parade of around 2,000 miners passes by the government camp with the sounds of bands and shouting and fifty pistol rounds.
- 29 August 1853: Assistant commissioner Robert Rede at Jones Creek, which along with Sandhurst were known hotbeds of activity for the Red Ribbon movement, counsels that a peaceful, political solution can still be found. In Ballarat, activists offered to surround the guard tent to protect gold reserves amid rumours of a planned robbery.
- 30 August 1853: Anti Gold Licence Society meets at Jones Creek.
- 6 September 1853: The goldfields committee of the legislative council sitting in Melbourne hears from goldfields activists Dr William Carr and messers W Fraser and William Jones.
- 24 September 1853: An Act for the better management of the Gold Fields in the Colony of Victoria. (17 Vict. No. 4 (Vic.)) is passed, which upon receiving royal assent on 1 December, reduces the licence fee to 40 shillings for three months. There is a scale of fines in the order of 5, 10 and 15 pounds for repeat offenders, with goldfields residents required to carry their permits that are to be open for immediate inspection at all times. The reduction is welcomed by the malcontents, thereby temporarily relieving tensions in the colony. In November, the select committee bill proposes a licence fee of 1 pound for one month, 2 pounds for three months, 3 for six months and 5 pounds for 12 months, extending the franchise and land rights for miners. La Trobe amends the scheme by increasing the six monthly licences to 4 pounds, with a fee of 8 pounds for 12 months.
- 3 December 1853: A crowd of 2,000-3,000 attended an anti-licence rally at Sandhurst, Bendigo.
- 9-10 December 1853: Affrays involving several stakeholders in the English and Irish quarters of the Eureka golf reef take place. Several people were wounded by gunfire on 27 December after another sizeable conflagration which was believed to be the result of a drunken brawl.
- 31 December 1853: At View Point, Sandhurst, about 500 individuals elected a so-called "Diggers Congress."

== 1854 ==
- 13 March 1854: There are further tensions after another affray between English and Irish nationals at the Eureka lead almost erupts.
- 20 March 1854: A knife and gunfight at the Chinese quarter of Eureka takes place leaving many stakeholders wounded.
- March 1854: The Bill to Extend the Elective Franchise, which as proposed and passed by the legislature on 19 January, attaches voting rights to 12 month mining licences subject to certain residency requirements, is drawn up by the Legislative Council and sent to London for the assent of the British Parliament.
- 28 March 1854: The combined forces of Britain and France declare war on Russia as the Crimean conflict begins.
- 6 May 1854: Colonial Secretary John Forster acts as interim Lieutenant Governor as LaTrobe leaves Victoria for England after announcing his intentions the previous July.
- 16 May 1854: Robert Rede was recommended by William Wright as the next resident gold commissioner for Ballarat. He replaces James Clow in June.
- 22 June 1854: Sir Charles Hotham takes up his commission as lieutenant governor of Victoria amid high hopes by the aggrieved miners as the financial situation of the colony continues to worsen.
- 5 July 1854: Rede describes the Eureka lead as the most densely populated and lawless part of the Ballarat precinct. On 11 July, he asked the government for more hospital funding as local chairman.
- 22 July 1854: Hotham calls for submissions from resident commissioners about how to arrest the colony's declining fortunes.
- 16 August 1854: In a scene from the wild west, an American by the name of Clarke accidentally kills the publican of the Albion Hotel in a dispute over a card game.
- 26 August 1854: Lieutenant Governor and Lady Hotham are well received in Ballarat during a tour of the Victorian-era goldfields, with many still optimistic about the possibility of a political solution. About 1,500 turn out to hear speakers decry the mining tax and gold commissioners.
- 13 September 1854: Hotham orders a cycle of twice weekly licence hunts as the budget situation becomes critical.
- 17 September 1854: The American restaurateur Frank Cary is imprisoned for bootlegging amid allegations he was fraudulently incriminated by the disliked police officer sergeant major Robert Milne.
- 3 October 1854: Rede reports on a visit to Fiery Creek, Beaufort, on vigilante punishment beatings and recommends an increased police presence after a man was given 12 lashes on suspicion of theft.
- 7 October 1854: Murder of James Scobie outside the Eureka Hotel at around 1 am. A colonial inquiry held later that day finds allegations of murder against the owner James Bently, cannot be supported by reliable identification evidence. Rede reports that the licence inspections at increased intervals would only cause more discontent over the mining tax itself and among all involved.
- 9 October 1854: Rede orders that a transcript of all future public meetings of subversives will be recorded by a magistrate and up to two reliable agents.
- 10 October 1854: A disabled servant in the employ of the parish priest Father Smyth is subjected to police brutality for licence evasion.
- 12 October 1854: An coronial inquest conducted by Magistrate Dews and commissioners Rede and Johnstone finds no evidence of culpability by the Bently Hotel owners for the fatal injuries amid allegations the Magistrate had a conflict of interest presiding over a case involving Bently, a friend and indebted business partner.
- 16 October 1854: Banker robbers who covered their faces with black crepe paper stage a heist in Ballarat at the Sturt Street branch of the Bank of Victoria.
- 17 October 1854: Peter Lalor acted as secretary for the committee, convening a mass meeting to call for a reinvestigation of the James Scobie murder case. Around 10,000 people were in attendance. As the afternoon progressed, the assembly culminated in the Eureka Hotel arson attack as security forces found themselves impotent in the face of the mob, who threw eggs and rubbish at Commissioner Rede. The government camp was rumoured to be the next target as Rede gave the order to excavate women and children and issued his garrison with live ammunition.
- 19 October 1854: Foot police reinforcements arrive, with a further detachment of the 40th Regiment a few days behind.
- 21 October 1854: Arrests begin in the Eureka Hotel case as Andrew McIntyre and Thomas Fletcher are taken into custody to answer allegations of arson. A third man, Westerby, would also be indicted. A meeting of miners on Bakery Hill agrees to indemnify the bail sureties for McIntyre and Fletcher.
- 22 October 1854: A mass meeting of predominantly Catholic miners takes place on Bakery Hill in protest over the treatment of Father Smyth’s servant and resolves to send Timothy Hayes to meet with commissioner Rede. At the meeting, the delegation was informed of the dismissal of constable Lord from the local command. However, another much objected-to official, assistant commissioner Johnstone, would be retaining his assignment. At 2 pm, a crowd of 10,000-15,000 appeared on Bakery Hill, where it was resolved to appropriate funds for the legal defence of McIntyre and Fletcher and censure the local officialdom for the Eureka Hotel fire. In the evening, there were reports received that another large body of miners was on the move towards the government outpost, as the police and military remained on high alert.
- 23 October 1854: A delegation is sent to Rede which seeks to have the police officers involved in the arrest of Father Smyth’s servant (Gregorious) dismissed.
- 25 October 1854: Another crowd of predominantly Roman Catholics attends a meeting convened by Hayes and Manning, which reports on the result of the deputation to Commissioner Rede. The meeting resolves to petition the Hotham seeking a retrial of Gregorius and the removal of assistant commissioner Johnston from Ballarat.
- 27 October 1854: Captain Thomas draws up contingency plans for low-intensity civil war in Ballarat and the defence of the government outpost.
- 28 October 1854: Rede reports through the chain of command that Westerby had been committed for trial for allegedly being one of the principal agitators at the burning of Bently's hotel.
- 30 October 1854: Hotham appoints a board of enquiry into the murder of James Scobie, which will sit in Ballarat on the 2nd and the 10th of November. The panel includes Melbourne magistrate Evelyn Sturt, assisted by his local magistrate Hackett and William McCrea. After receiving representations from the US consul, Hotham releases James Tarleton from custody.
- 1 November 1854: At a gathering of 5,000 miners in Bendigo, a plan is drawn up to organise the diggers at all the mining settlements, as speakers openly advocating physical force address the crowd.
- 10 November 1854: The Ballarat Reform League submits a statement to the commission of enquiry made by John Basson Humffray, Fredrick Vern, 'Captain' Henry Ross and Samuel Irwin of the Geelong Advertiser. The immediate dismissal of Magistrate Dewes and sergeant major Milne of the constabulary was carried out as recommended in a report which blamed the authorities for the outbreak of rioting in Ballarat.
- 11 November 1854: It is formally moved at a public meeting on Bakery Hill that the Ballarat Reform League be established at a meeting of up to 10,000 people. The political ideals enunciated by the approved charter were inspired by 19th-century English Chartism and the right to vote. They also supported the immediate abolition of all mining and trading licences and the end of the gold commission.
- 16 November 1854: Hotham sends a message to England which reveals his intention to establish an inquiry into goldfields grievances. Notes to the royal commissioners had already been made on 6 November, where Hotham stated his opposition to an export duty on gold replacing the universal mining tax. W.C. Haines MLC was to be the chairman, serving alongside lawmakers John Fawkner, John O'Shanassy, and William Westgarth, as well as chief gold commissioner William Wright.
- 18 November 1854: On trial over the death of James Scobie, James Bently, Thomas Farrell and William Hance are convicted of manslaughter and sentenced to three years of hard labour on a road crew. Catherine Bently was acquitted.
- 20 November 1854: The miners Westerby, Fletcher and McIntyre are convicted for the burning of the Eureka Hotel and, in turn, were sentenced to jail terms of six, four and three months. The jury recommended the prerogative of mercy be involved and noted that they held the local authorities in Ballarat responsible for the loss of property.
- 25 November 1854: Commissioner Rede receives information that the government camp may be in danger if the convicted men are not released and that he and his gold commissioners would be expelled.
- 27 November 1854: A Ballarat Reform League delegation, including Humffray, Black and Kennedy, meets with Hotham, Attorney General Stawell and Colonial Secretary Foster to negotiate the release of the three Eureka Hotel rioters. Hotham does not accede to the miner’s request, taking exception to the approach that was made being framed as a “demand”. Father Smyth confines to commissioner Rede in secret that the government camp is in danger of attack and claims the dissidents could easily procure up to 1,000 rifles.
- 28 November 1854: More British redcoats arrive as elements, including the 12th regiment, are called in to reinforce the town garrison. As they moved alongside where the Eureka Stockade was to be erected, the military convoy was looted. A drummer boy and several other members of the convoy were attacked by the mob.
- 29 November 1854: A mass "monster" meeting takes place on Bakery Hill with over 10,000 supporters in attendance to hear that the three convicted men will continue to serve their sentence. Humffray continues to champion his "moral force" argument, as his call for non-violent resistance was supported by Catholic Bishop Gould of Victoria and fathers Dowling and Smyth. However, with the Eureka flag making its first appearance on the platform, the men of peace were drowned out by a largely unsympathetic audience. According to the folklore, Fredrick Vern incited a number of diggers to burn their mining permits on a bonfire as spies from the government camp looked on.
- 30 November 1854: After ordering a licence hunt under commissioner Johnstone which was fiercely resisted by the miners who send a hail of rocks showering down from the gravel pits on the Eureka lead, Rede appears to read the riot act as miners, who from that morning had started refusing en masse to produce their licences. Government forces fire a warning volley over the miner's heads as a number are taken into custody and held at the government camp. With Ross acting as the standard bearer for the Eureka flag, rebel columns approach Bakery Hill. About 1,000 desperate and angry men under Lalor, Ross, Vern and Carboni begin constructing a rudimentary entrenchment of diagonal spikes and overturned horse carts. In the afternoon, prospecting on the Eureka lead ceases as another meeting takes place as Lalor, who was the only leading light of the mining tax protest movement in attendance, takes the initiative by mounting the stump at the masthead and proclaiming liberty. And then, according to Hotham's words: "the Australian flag of independence was solemnly consecrated and vows proffered for its defence". Rede receives intelligence that the outpost may be attacked at 4 pm the next day. Captain Pasley also shares fears the situation is coming to a violent head and asks his commanders for more men and a battery of cannons.
- 1 December 1854: At 4 am, the rebels were observed to be massing on Bakery Hill, but a government raiding party found the area vacated. Again Rede orders the riot act read to a mob that had gathered around Bath's Hotel, with mounted police breaking up the unlawful assembly. The rebels continue to fortify their position as 300-400 men arrive from Creswick Creek to join the struggle. The arrival of this group, who must be armed, fed and housed, places great strain on the stockade's resources. Major General Sir Robert Nickle leaves Melbourne for Ballarat with 800 men. Raffaello Carboni, George Black and Father Smyth meet with Commissioner Rede to present a peace proposal. Rede is suspicious of the chartist undercurrent of the anti-mining tax movement and rejects the proposals as being the way forward. In his book, Carboni would seem to recall this meeting as taking place on 30 November.
- 2 December 1854: Father Smyth issues a plea for Catholics to down their arms and attend mass the following day. In the vicinity of the Eureka Stockade, Assistant commissioner Gilbert Amos had his horse confiscated by the rebel garrison and was briefly held hostage. The Independent Californian Rangers under James McGill arrive at the stockade in the late afternoon. In a fateful decision, McGill would eventually take most of his force on a mission to intercept rumoured British reinforcements en route from the capital. A meeting of around 600 people in Pall Mall, Sandhurst, hears a report on the unfolding events in Ballarat. A local speaker calls for the miners to wear the red ribbon in their hats as a sign of solidarity with the Eureka rebels.
- 3 December 1854: The Battle of the Eureka Stockade takes place in Ballarat. A 15-minute siege ensues as 276 soldiers and foot police under Captain Thomas make their way to the rebel position at 3.30 am to besiege a rebel garrison that was down to 120-200 armed insurgents. Based on information, including figures from Lalor's letter to the colonists of Victoria, up to 30 rebels and non-combatants are said to have been killed during what the British commander Captain Thomas would describe as "a trifling affair," with an official total of four soldiers losing their lives. Around 120 prisoners are taken captive and marched to the government camp.
- 4 December 1854: The first newspaper report of the battle appeared in The Argus which mentions that two rebel battle flags were captured at the fall of the Eureka Stockade. A state of martial law is declared in Ballarat. The editor of the Ballarat Times, Henry Seekamp, is arrested and indicted for seditious libel and held with the rebel detainees.
- 5 December 1854: Major General Nickle joins the government camp in Ballarat. A crowd attending a public meeting in Melbourne called in support of Hotham instead condemns the police action, and the meeting is hastily adjourned.
- 6 December 1854: Committal proceedings in relation to the rebel prisoners begin in Ballarat with Magistrate E. P. S. Sturt presiding. A 6000-strong gathering at Saint Paul’s Cathedral disapproves of the government response, and there is much approval of certain demands made by the chartists. Similar meetings would be held around the colony. Hotham receives messages of support from his principal allies among the land-owning class known as squatters.
- 8 December 1854: Thirteen accused rebel prisoners are committed for trial on counts of high treason.
- 9 December 1854: The previously declared state of martial law is repealed. Crowds of 600 and 2000 people attend meetings in Sandhurst and Castlemaine, respectively, to protest against the government over the Eureka riots and for the repeal of the mining tax.
- 11 December 1854: John Forster, the colonial secretary, resigns to be replaced by W.C. Haines. An inquest into the death of Henty Powell, who, while mortally wounded, makes an affidavit to the effect he was an innocent bystander and a considerable distance away when he was fired at by clerk of the peace Arthur Akehurst, who also struck at him with a sword. On 18 January 1855, Akehurst was found not guilty of manslaughter.
- 14 December 1854: The Gold Fields Commission sits for the first time. The first Ballarat session of the Gold Fields Commission was held at Bath’s Hotel on 18 December 1854, with the miners allowed representation at all open hearings. Westgarth is made the chairman as Hanies' place on the commission is taken by John Hodgson MLC.
- 16 December 1854: After death threats against several police officers are made, Inspector Forster recommends a complete watch rotation for the Ballarat outpost as a precaution.
- 23 December 1854: Hotham informs the head of the gold commission William Wright that the ambit of the royal inquiry should not include the events of 3 December at Bakery Hill or claims for compensation. He would later say that there had been a miscommunication after complaints from members of the panel, who were nevertheless advised the judiciary was the most appropriate forum to hear claims for damages and also that in the interests of preserving the peace, it may be unwise to criticise the administration for regrettable actions made during the heat of the battle.

== 1855 ==
- 8 January 1855: The Gold Fields Commission meets with Hotham and unanimously recommends that the mining tax be lifted.
- 10 January 1855: Hotham refuses a recommendation from the Gold Fields Commission that a general amnesty be granted in relation to all those persons criminally liable for their association with the Eureka Rebellion.
- 23 January 1855: The trial of Henry Seekamp results in a finding of guilt for seditious libel. On 26 March 1855, he was sentenced to serve a term of imprisonment for six months.
- 5 February 1855: Government House receives a petition from the Ovens goldfield calling for the end of the existing mining tax regulations.
- 17 February 1855: The Victorian Attorney-General is burnt in effigy as 400 people attend a drive-in Sandhurst to raise money to meet the legal costs of the men indicted for high treason.
- 22 February 1855: The trial of John Joseph begins as he becomes the first rebel to answer charges of high treason. Throughout February and March, all the defendants are acquitted with the crown case against Dignum being withdrawn.
- 24 February 1855: New Ballarat gold commissioner, Charles Sherard, reports that political tensions had largely subsided in his district.
- 27 March 1855: The final report of the Royal Commission into the Victorian goldfields is presented to Hotham. The key recommendations are that: the existing arrangements be terminated, the gold licence replaced by an export duty on gold, extending voting rights to holders of a current mining permit and the scrapping of the gold commission, and laws to protect workers against competition from Chinese labourers.
- 4 April 1855: At the Alma diggings, a mob of 5,000 miners gather for the ostensible purpose of lynching a murder suspect.
- 20 April 1855: Royal assent is granted to An Act for granting duties of Customs upon Gold exported from Victoria (18 Vict. No. 27 (Vic)).
- 9 May 1855: A general amnesty is granted to Peter Lalor and the other rebels on the run from the Eureka Stockade.
- 12 May 1855: Another mutual protection society forms at Alma with the aim of lawfully safeguarding the lives and property of individual members.
- 22 May 1855: A new Victorian electoral act gives mining permit holders the right to contest and vote in elections for the legislative council.
- 29 May 1855: A Maryborough mutual protection society is formed along the same lines as its counterpart in Alma.
- 12 June 1855: Royal assent is granted to An Act to make provision for certain Immigrants (18 Vict. No. 39 (Vic)).
- 14 July 1855: Carboni is one of nine miners elected to a special local court, an early form of alternative dispute resolution established to adjudicate on mining-related matters.
- 16 July 1855: Victorian Constitution enacted at Westminster. Hotham received a transmission signed by Lord Russell on 20 July with the Constitution Act and the order in council from Queen Victoria's 21 July royal assent. On 23 November, Hotham proclaimed the enactment of the new colonial constitution in Melbourne.
- 10 November 1855: Lalor and Hummfray win seats in the Victorian Legislative Council at the general elections.
- 31 December 1855: Hotham, who was promoted on 22 May when the official title of the chief executive of the colony was changed from lieutenant governor to governor, died in Melbourne after catching a cold.

== See also ==
- Bibliography of the Eureka Rebellion

== Bibliography ==
=== Books ===
- Clark, Manning (1987). A History of Australia. Vol. IV: The Earth Abideth Forever 1851-1888. Carlton: Melbourne University Press. ISBN 9780522841473.
- Corfield, Justin; Wickham, Dorothy; Gervasoni, Clare (2004). The Eureka Encyclopedia. Ballarat: Ballarat Heritage Services. ISBN 978-1-87-647861-2.
- Hocking, Geoff (2004). Eureka Stockade a pictorial history: the events leading to the attack in the pre-dawn of 3 December 1854. Rowville: Five Mile Press. ISBN 1-7412-4426-9.
- MacFarlane, Ian (1995). Eureka from the Official Records. Melbourne: Public Record Office Victoria. ISBN 978-0-73-066011-8.

=== Newspaper reports ===
- "MORE GOLD". Geelong Advertiser. 12 August 1851. p. 2 – via Trove.
- Serle, Geoffrey (1963). The Golden Age: A History of the Colony of Victoria, 1851-1861. Melbourne: Melbourne University Press. ISBN 978-0-52-284143-5.
