= William Bramwell Withers =

Anglo-Australian historian and journalist

W. B. Withers
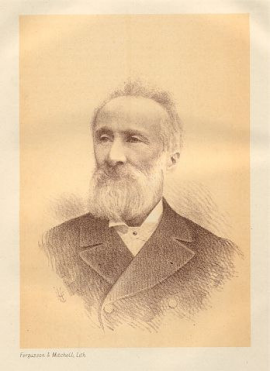
- A photograph of Withers in Australian Representative Men (1887)
- Born: William Bramwell Withers; 27 July 1823; Whitchurch, Hampshire, England
- Died: 14 July 1913 (aged 89); Dulwich Hill, Sydney, Australia
- Occupations: Journalist; historian; novelist
- Known for: A History of Ballarat (1870)

William Bramwell Withers (27 July 1823 – 14 July 1913) was a journalist and novelist best known for writing the first history of Ballarat, Victoria. Born in England, Withers moved to the Colony of Natal in 1849 and contributed to local newspapers. He moved to Victoria in 1852, working odd jobs before becoming a reporter for the Argus and the Herald in Melbourne.

By 1855, Withers was living in Ballarat, where he worked as a journalist for the Ballarat Times, the Ballarat Star, the Miner and Weekly Star and later the Ballarat Courier. Withers endeavored to write a history of Ballarat, spending five years of research before the first edition was published in 1870 to great praise. A second edition was published in 1887. He also served on the first committee of the mechanics' institute, was a co-proprietor of the Ballarat Star from 1875–1880 and wrote two novels. In 1901, Withers left for Sydney, where he died in 1913.

== Early life ==
William Bramwell Withers was born on 27 July 1823 in Whitchurch, Hampshire, England. He was the youngest son of tenant farmer and Wesleyan lay preacher Jason Withers and his second wife, Elizabeth née Hendy, who died in 1929. Withers was educated at a grammar school until the age of thirteen, when he was apprenticed by his uncle, a storekeeper in Winchester. A lifelong opponent of capital punishment, he wrote articles in temperance and vegetarian journals.

After his father died in 1946, Withers used the £300 left to him to buy 300 acres (121 ha) in Natal, South Africa. He moved there in 1849 and contributed to the Natal Witness and Natal Standard. After he and James Ellis bought a farm of 6,000 acres (2,428 ha), Withers sold it to him and moved to Pietermaritzburg, where he worked as a journalist and learned to set type in Dutch and English.

== Australia ==
=== Melbourne and Ballarat ===
==== Journalism ====
In November 1952, Withers reached Melbourne in Victoria, Australia in the Hannah, attracted by the Australian gold rushes. He walked to Ballarat, but failed as a gold prospector and returned to Melbourne. He was employed as a roadmaker, a drayman and a clerk on the wharves before joining the Argus as a reader and later reporter in 1854, then transferring to the Herald.

By June 1855, Withers had returned to Ballarat but his failure to find gold continued. He worked as a reporter and part-time compositor at the Ballarat Times before joining the newly founded Ballarat Star on 22 September 1855, and was the mining correspondent for both the Star and the Miner and Weekly Star. Austin McCallum, in Withers' entry in the Australian Dictionary of Biography, said that he "proved a fluent and scholarly journalist" and added "appealing humour" to his reporting. Withers was elected to the first committee of the mechanics' institute in 1859 and was a founder of the Ballarat Bowling Club in 1865, becoming the first champion bowler. He lived on Lyons Street with Mary Ann Dusatoy. From 1875–1880, Withers, Henry Richard Nicholls and E. E. Campbell (H. R. Nicholls and Co.) were co-proprietors of the Ballarat Star.

==== Works ====
Endeavoring to write a history of Ballarat, Withers spent five years researching and contacting surviving squatters, mining pioneers and those involved with the Eureka Rebellion. His History of Ballarat, in full A History of Ballarat from the first pastoral settlement to the present time, was published by the Star in twelve weekly parts from 11 June 1870. Bound volumes were sold from 9 August and two other editions were published. A History of Ballarat was praised by reviewers for Withers' thorough research, objectivity and style. Eureka Rebellion participant Montague Miller wrote that during the event, "[Withers] was continually over all the diggings, securing each day and being fully informed on every incident of importance for his daily paper."

One of the first major accounts of the Eureka Rebellion, Kent Ball, a librarian at the State Library Victoria, described A History of Ballarat as a "classic research resource". The first edition credited Thomas Brown of Conner's Party and Thomas Dunn and George Wilson of the Geelong Mutual Association with almost simultaneously discovering gold on the Ballarat goldfield on August 24 or 25, 1851. In 1971, Henry James Stacpoole wrote that this account was widely but not universally accepted and gave evidence that James Regan and his partner James Dunlop discovered gold several days earlier at Poverty Point. He attributed the error to the tradition that Golden Point and Poverty Point were separate goldfields, that Withers did not then have access to the newspaper files at the La Trobe Library and that Withers based the book on oral accounts nineteen years later. According to historian Clare Wright, the History first perpetuated the myth that the Australian goldfields were exclusively male, despite this only applying to the earlies days of the gold rush.

He wrote two novels which were widely serialized: Eustace Hopkins (1882), which won second place in a competition of 120 sponsored by The Age, and The Westons (1883), which was published in the Melbourne World and Federal Australian. After the Star was sold, Withers was hired by the Ballarat Courier. In 1887, Francis Niven published a second edition of A History of Ballarat, which was revised and illustrated. 10,200 copies were printed for one guinea, but sales were slow. He also wrote Ballarat Chronicles and Pictures and Reminiscences of the '50's and '60's.

=== Sydney ===
Withers moved to Sydney in 1901, but continued to write for the Courier. Withers visited England and returned to Winchester, leaving on 19 March 1903. He wrote about his experiences in the Star, which were published as 'A Pilgrim Pioneer' from September to December. The Dictionary notes that his writing had become "pedantic". Withers died of a cerebral hemorrhage on 14 July 1913 in Dulwich Hill and was buried at Rookwood Cemetery, leaving his estate of £90 to Mary Ann Dusatoy.

== Character ==
The Dictionary described Withers as "short, bristly whiskered, long-striding, frock-coated" with an umbrella "always [...] under arm" and having a "gentle character".

== Personal life ==
Withers never married. In Ballarat, he lived on Lyons Street with Mary Ann Dusatoy. By 1907, he was living in Dulwich Hill, Sydney, with her and her son William Leslie Withers Dusatoy. Withers died of a cerebral hemorrhage on 14 July 1913 in Dulwich Hill and was buried at Rookwood Cemetery, leaving his estate of £90 to Mary Ann Dusatoy.

== Works ==
- Withers, William Bramwell (1870). A History of Ballarat from the first pastoral settlement to the present time. Ballarat.
- ——— (1882). Eustace Hopkins: His Friends and Foes.
- ——— (1883). The Westons.
- ——— (1887). The History of Ballarat, From the First Pastoral Settlement to the Present Time (2nd ed.). Ballarat: F. W. Niven and Co.
- ———. Ballarat Chronicles and Pictures.
- ———. Reminiscences of the '50s and '60s.

== Bibliography and further reading ==
- Bate, Weston (1978). Lucky City: The First Generation at Ballarat: 1851–1901. Carlton: Melbourne University Press. ISBN 9780522841572.
- Corfield, Justin; Wickham, Dorothy; Gervasoni, Clare (2004). "WITHERS, WILLIAM BRAMWELL (1823–1913)". The Eureka Encyclopedia. Ballarat: Ballarat Heritage Services. ISBN 1-876478-61-6.
- Gay, Robert (1935). Some Ballarat Pioneers. Mentone.
- Leavitt, T. W. H., ed. (1887). Australian Representative Men. Vol. 1. Melbourne: Wells and Leavitt.
- Mennell, Philip (1892). "Withers, William Bramwell" . The Dictionary of Australasian Biography. London: Hutchinson & Co – via Wikisource.
- McCallum, Austin (1976). "Withers, William Bramwell (1823–1913)". Australian Dictionary of Biography. National Centre of Biography, Australian National University. ISBN 978-0-522-84459-7. ISSN 1833-7538. OCLC 70677943.
- Miller, Montague (20 October 1917). "RECOLLECTIONS OF THE BALLARAT INSURRECTION PERSONAL EXPERIENCES OF THOSE HEROIC DAYS. DOINGS OF CAPTAIN DANA'S BLACK POLICE". Truth.
- Stacpoole, Henry James (1971). Gold at Ballarat; the Ballarat East goldfield; its discovery and development. Kilmore, Victoria: Lowden Publishing Co. ISBN 0909706115.
- Wright, Clare (2013). The Forgotten Rebels of Eureka. Melbourne: Text Publishing. ISBN 9781922148407.
- "DEATH OF MR. W. B. WITHERS". The Ballarat Star. 16 July 1913. p. 6 – via Trove.
