= Bennelong Society =

Former think-tank for Indigenous Australians

The Bennelong Society was a conservative think-tank dedicated to Indigenous Australian affairs. The society was named after the Eora man Bennelong, who served as an interlocutor between the Indigenous Australian and British cultures, both in Sydney and in the United Kingdom almost from the start of British settlement of Australia in 1788. It was affiliated with conservative commentators in debates on Indigenous affairs. The society was established to:

- promote debate and analysis of Aboriginal policy in Australia, both contemporary and historical;
- inquire into the causes of the present appalling plight of many contemporary Aboriginal people;
- seek to influence public opinion so that the prospects for amelioration of the condition of these people are improved;
- encourage research into the history of the interaction between Australia's Indigenous people and the Europeans and others who settled in Australia from 1788 onwards, and of the ideas through which this interaction was interpreted by both Europeans and Aborigines;
- make available to the Australian community, particularly through the Internet, the results of these activities.

The Bennelong Society website was officially launched by Senator the Hon. John Herron with a speech at Parliament House, Canberra on 15 May 2001.

It was one of a number of groups, including the H. R. Nicholls Society, Samuel Griffith Society and Lavoisier Group, promoted by Australian business leader and political activist Ray Evans. The president was Gary Johns.

The Society was wound up in 2011 but its work was partly continued by a "Bennelong papers" section of the Quadrant magazine website.

== Bennelong Medal ==
The Society held an annual conference and awarded the Bennelong Medal from 2002. Recipients of the medal have been:

- 2002: Professor Boni Robertson, who had chaired the Aboriginal and Torres Strait Islander Women's Task Force on Violence. Citation: "awarded for her leadership in the difficult area of family violence and her courage in pursuing actions by both State and Federal governments to ameliorate this grave problem."
- 2003: Dulcie and Dorothy Wilson, members of the Ngarrindjeri community of South Australia, and significant dissidents in the Hindmarsh Island bridge controversy. Citation: "Hindmarsh Island is in the end a story of heroism. It is about the courage of the dissident women who saw their culture being abused and decided to do something about it."
- 2004: Pastor Paul Albrecht AM, Director of the Finke River (Hermannsburg) Mission from 1970 to 1998. Citation: "He was awarded the Bennelong Medal in recognition of his long and dedicated service as missionary and translator to the Aboriginal people of Central Australia, and as wise councillor to all Australians on Aboriginal Affairs."
- 2005: Warren Mundine, vice-president of the Australian Labor Party. Citation: "Warren has been a brave advocate for change. His proposal to change the way community owned land is controlled was aimed quite squarely at improving the wealth and well-being of his people."
- 2006: Dr Sue Gordon, AM, Chair of the National Indigenous Council and a Western Australian magistrate. Citation: for her devotion and commitment to the well-being of Aboriginal Australians
- 2007: Louis Nowra, a respected and established Australian playwright. Citation: 31 August 2007 by John Reeves QC, a member of the NT Emergency Response Task Force, for his courage in writing about Aboriginal men's violence towards Aboriginal women in his book, Bad Dreaming
- 2008: Hon. Mal Brough who was the Minister for Indigenous Affairs in the Howard Government that initiated the Northern Territory National Emergency Response. Citation: 'for bringing hope to the women and children living in remote Aboriginal communities, for a future free from violence and appalling abuse
- 2009: Bess Price, indigenous Alice Springs activist who has criticised indigenous violence. Citation: 'for her forthright defence of the Northern Territory National Emergency Response and her challenge to "white students and cranky Kooris and Murris from down south who know nothing about Aboriginal people and who hate whitefellas"' .
