= James Oddie =

Ballarat merchant, banker, landowner, patron of the arts, and philanthropist (1824–1911)

- James Oddie (1884)
- Born: March 31, 1824; Clitheroe, Lancashire, England
- Died: March 3, 1911 (aged 86); Ballarat, Victoria, Australia

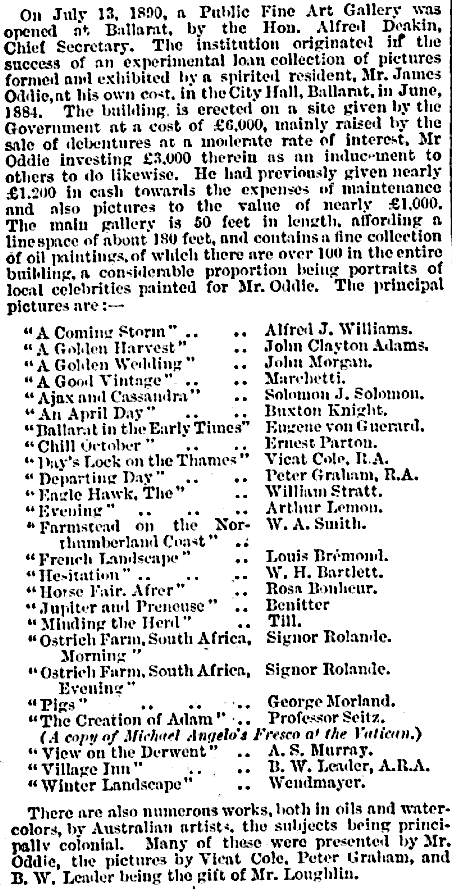
Opening of Ballarat Fine Art Gallery (1890).

James Oddie (31 March 1824 – 3 March 1911) was an Australian merchant, banker, landowner, scientist, astronomer, and patron of the arts, who had been a direct witness of the events leading up to and involving the Eureka Stockade on 3 December, 1854.

As a Wesleyan Methodist, Sabbatarian and lifelong abstainer, he was an active lay Methodist. As a former gold digger and scientist, he was an advocate for technical education and scientific research. As "one of Ballarat's wealthiest citizens", he was also a benefactor and philanthropist who contributed to many aspects of his community.

== Family ==
The oldest of the four children of James Oddie, and Margaret Oddie, née Hargreaves, James Oddie was born at Clitheroe, Lancashire, England, on 31 March 1824.

He married Rachel Riding in 1847. Their daughter Alice was born in 1848. James, Rachel, and Alice, as well as Oppie's younger brother, Thomas Ralph Oddie (1830–1927), Rev. Dr. W.H. Fitchett, and one Mary McCormick (who later became Oddie's second wife) were all on the notorious typhoid-affected voyage of Rev. Dr. John Dunmore Lang's Port Phillip Colonisation Company's chartered immigrant ship The Larpent that arrived in Geelong on 28 June 1849.

Both his wife, Rachel, and his daughter, Alice, died in Geelong on 13 July 1849 (a fortnight later) of the typhoid they had contracted on the voyage to Australia. Oppie never forgot the generosity, care, and compassion that had been displayed by the Rev. Francis Tuckfield (1808–1865), and his wife, Sarah (1808–1854), of the Yarra Street Methodist Church in Geelong, who threw their house open to those Larpent passengers, such as Rachel and Alice, afflicted by the typhoid they had contracted on board. In 1906, Oppie, "the senior surviving passenger of the ship", contributed to the memorial tablet that was unveiled in the Tuckfield's Geelong church on the 56th anniversary of the Larpent's arrival in Geelong.

He married Mary McCormick, in Geelong in 1850. They had no children.

James Oddie and the Eureka Stockade

Mr. Oddie is a, native of Preston, in Lancashire. He arrived in the
colony on the 28th June, 1849; by the Larpent, and for a time carried
on business as an ironfounder at Geelong. On the discovery of gold
being reported he came to Ballarat in September, 1851, and was an
eye witness of all that occurred on the diggings during the Stockade
epoch. He witnessed the arrival of Commissioner [Francis] Doveton,
Assistant Commissioner [David] Armstrong, Police Inspector Captain
[William] Dana and their contingent of black and white constabulary.
It was when this bevy had taken up their quarters on the gold fields
that the official tyranny commenced, and it was Mr. Oddie, then the
proprietor of the Kossuth store on the Eureka [goldfield], who heard
[what] Commissioner Doveton said, in reply to the diggers' appeal
for fair play, "I have come here not to make law, but to administer it,
and if you don't put up with it I'll d— soon make you."
The Age, 27 January 1893.

== Career ==
Originally apprenticed as a tinsmith, Oddie went on to work as a foundryman and journeyman moulder at the Bridgewater Foundry in Patricroft, near Manchester where he observed James Nasmyth's early trials in the development of his steam hammer.

== Inventions ==
He had many interests, including the early developments of the telephone; and he was the very first subscriber to the Ballarat telephone system in February 1883. His inventions included:

- The Shackleton Polarizer (a,k.a. The Shackleton Vaporizer): Mechanical apparatus, demonstrated to a group of his scientific colleagues — Dr Thomas Cherry, Director, Victorian Department of Agriculture; Mr. Benjamin Deakin, Manager, Electric Supply Company of Victoria Mr. Thomas Percy Long, President, Ballarat Benevolent Asylum Committee; Mr. Frederick J. Martell, Director, Ballarat School of Mines; Professor Alfred Mica Smith, Ballarat School of Mines; and Professor Daniel Walker, Ballarat School of Mines (Note: N.B. The information supplied with the photograph at mistakenly locates the group at the Ballarat School of Mines, rather than at Oddie's Macarthur street residence. It identifies the seven of the eight individuals as follows (left to right): Deakin, Walker, Martell, Cherry, Long, Smith, unknown, Oddie.) — at Oddie's residence on 29 April 1910.
  In principle, rather like a Coolgardie safe, the apparatus contained an electric fan that forced air over 12 concentric rows of steel netting, each covered with dampened hessian. It was designed to cool the atmosphere within a house "during the oppressive weather". During Oddie's April 1910 demonstration the room's air temperature reduced from 102 °F (39°Celsius) to 86 °F (30°Celsius).
  Oddie also noted that James Young Simpson, the Physician to the Queen in Scotland, had expressed the view that "at no distant date medicine would be taken by respiration, and so direct into the circulation"; and, from this, in addition to its value as "a house cooler", Oddie suggested the equipment could also be used in the treatment of "miners' complaints" (Note: In many cases, rather than being (a) dust-related Miner's phthisis (silicosis), or (b) sanitation-related respiratory conditions such as tuberculosis, pneumonia, bronchitis, and influenza, these "miners' complaints" were often due to (i) the "foul air"-related respiratory conditions from a lack of oxygen due to poor ventilation, or the carbon monoxide or carbon dioxide generated by rotting vegetation/food scraps left in the mine by miners, or (ii) the "acrid fume"-related respiratory conditions caused by either the explosive blasting within the mines, or the poisons used to refine the ore produced from the mining.) in health facilities "as a dispenser of vaporised sanatives, including oxygen".

== Philanthropy and benefaction ==
=== Lalor statue ===
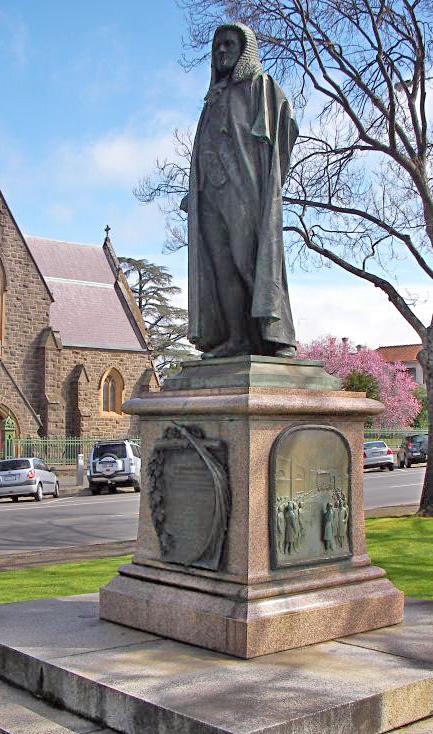
The statue of Peter Lalor, Sturt Street, Ballarat.

In April 1890, Oddie announced that he had commissioned a bronze statue of Peter Lalor, which he would donate to the people of Ballarat and place "in a prominent site in Sturt-street".
The 3-metre-high statue, created by the London sculptor, Thomas Nelson McLean (1845–1894), was unveiled on 26 January 1893 by Duncan Gillies, the former Premier of Victoria (who had "worked as mate" with Lalor on the Ballarat goldfields in 1853), in the presence of Lalor's son and grandson. Richard Everist (2006, p. 121) noting that "many of the surviving diggers stayed away from the unveiling", observed that "perhaps they wanted to remember Lalor at the height of his radical glory on the diggings, not as the conservative parliamentarian in robes and a wig that he became (and that the statue represent[ed])."

== Offices and Affiliations ==
=== Offices ===
- Chairman: First-ever chairman of the Ballarat Municipal Council.
- President and Member of Committee of Management: Ballarat Benevolent Asylum.
- Founder, First President, and Patron: Art Gallery of Ballarat.
- President: Ballarat Field Club and Science Society.
- Vice-President: Ballarat School of Mines (1881).

=== Affiliations ===
- Associate member: Institution of Electrical Engineers, London (1891).
- Country member: Royal Society of Victoria (1882).
- Fellow: Geological Society of London, (1888).
- Fellow: Royal Geographical Society, London (1888).
- Fellow: Royal Astronomical Society, England (1889).
- Member: Zoological and Acclimatization Society of Victoria (1874).
- Member: Society of Chemical Industry, London (1887).
- Member: The Australian Historical Records Society (1896).

== Death ==
Oddie died (suddenly) following a "paralytic seizure" at his Ballarat residence on 3 March 1911. At the time of his death Oddie was Ballarat's "oldest pioneer". Oddie's funeral was held on 5 March, and he was buried at the Ballaarat New Cemetery.

=== Tributes ===
One of the many tributes to his memory was a poem by Bella Guerin-Lavender (1858-1923), the daughter of Patrick Guerin (1824-1893), Governor of Ballarat Gaol from 1881 to 1891. She had taught Matriculation classes at the Ballarat School of Mines over five years (from 1887 to 1891). Another was from the former Mayor of Ballarat William Little (1839–1916).

=== Will ===
"Enquiries made yesterday with regard to the wealth of the late Mr James Oddie showed that he was not nearly as well off as many people supposed. In the early days he amassed a small fortune, but most of it was lost when the bank crash occurred many years ago. It has also to be borne in mind that Mr Oddie spent a large sum of money on Ballarat; and during his lifetime he always gave liberally to local charitable institutions."
The Ballarat Star, 10 March 1911.

The main beneficiary of his will was his niece, Mrs. Alice Oddie Blandford (1850–1940), née Davies (the daughter of his youngest sister, Jane). One of the legacies he provided was that "£100 [was] to be invested and the income to be used for the purpose of keeping the graves of the diggers who fell in the Eureka Stockade fight in good order".

== See also ==
- Bibliography of the Eureka Rebellion
- Mount Stromlo Observatory
