= Ray Evans (Australian businessman) =

Australian businessman (1939–2014)

- Born: 10 September 1939
- Died: 17 June 2014 (aged 74)
- Education: University of Melbourne
- Occupations: Businessman, political conservative, and campaigner
- Known for: Campaign against climate change mitigation efforts

Ray Evans (10 September 1939 – 17 June 2014) was an Australian businessman, political conservative, and campaigner against climate change mitigation efforts.

== Early years and education ==
Ray Evans was educated at Melbourne High School. He attended the University of Melbourne, from which he graduated in electrical and mechanical engineering. During university, he was president of the Melbourne University ALP Club, and a delegate from the Federated Fodder and Fuel Trades Union to Victorian Australian Labor Party (ALP) state conferences.

He resigned from the ALP to act as campaign manager for Sam Benson in the latter's successful campaign to retain the federal seat of Batman as an independent in 1966. In the 1960s, Evans worked as an engineer in the production planning section of the State Electricity Commission of Victoria.

== Career ==
He taught electrical engineering at Deakin University, Victoria. From 1982 until 2001, he was executive officer at Western Mining Corporation in Australia, under Hugh Morgan. From July 2001 to June 2014, he was the director of Ray Evans & Associates, a consultancy specialising in political and economic advice.

== Political advocacy ==
In January 1986, Evans, along with former federal Treasurer Peter Costello and two others, founded the H R Nicholls Society, a think tank of the New Right, of which he became president. The Society has had considerable influence over Liberal Party policies. The initial motivation for founding the Society was industrial relations – a commitment to "freedom in the labour market", and opposition to the Australian industrial relations mechanism, represented by the establishment of the minimum wage by Justice Henry Bourne Higgins in the 1905 "Harvester Judgement".

=== Global warming scepticism ===
Evans was a founder of the Lavoisier Group, which opposed the ratification of the Kyoto Protocol treaty, believing that the science associated with global warming was uncertain. He was instrumental in establishing a number of other right-wing organisations, such as the Bennelong Society, and the Samuel Griffith Society, serving as either president or treasurer of each; according to author Clive Hamilton, many of these groups "shared the same post office box". A supporter of the "Greenhouse Mafia", he campaigned against climate change initiatives.

In collaboration with Morgan, Evans worked against the Kyoto treaty, and was central to the campaign to prevent the former Federal Liberal government from taking actions to cut emissions.

In February 2006, Evans published Nine Lies About Global Warming, wherein he quotes a 1992 work by political scientist Aaron Wildavsky that states, "Global warming is the mother of environmental scares."

He appeared on the ABC's discussion panel, The Great Global Warming Swindle, which questioned the science behind global warming. He has stated that environmentalism is a "religious belief", and published a book Nine Facts About Climate Change in 2007.

Evans was quoted in The Age as saying that Al Gore's film An Inconvenient Truth is "bullshit from beginning to end", and that "the carbon-dioxide link [to global warming] is increasingly recognised as irrelevant".

== Death and legacy ==
He died on 17 June 2014 in Melbourne, aged 74 (though some reports incorrectly stated he was 79). The Age then memorialized him as a modern radical:

In the arena of industrial relations Evans and his anti-union cohort were true radicals, and were treated as such when they emerged in the 1980s. Bob Hawke called them ‘‘political troglodytes and economic lunatics’’. Victorian union leader John Halfpenny labelled the H.R. Nicholls Society ‘‘the industrial relations branch of the Ku Klux Klan’’, and was promptly sued for defamation. Even John Howard, who devoted much of his political career to industrial relations reform along similar lines, found their agenda too radical and ‘‘politically unrealistic’’.
