= Hugh Morgan (businessman) =

Australian business executive and director (born 1940)

Hugh Morgan AC MAusIMM FTSE
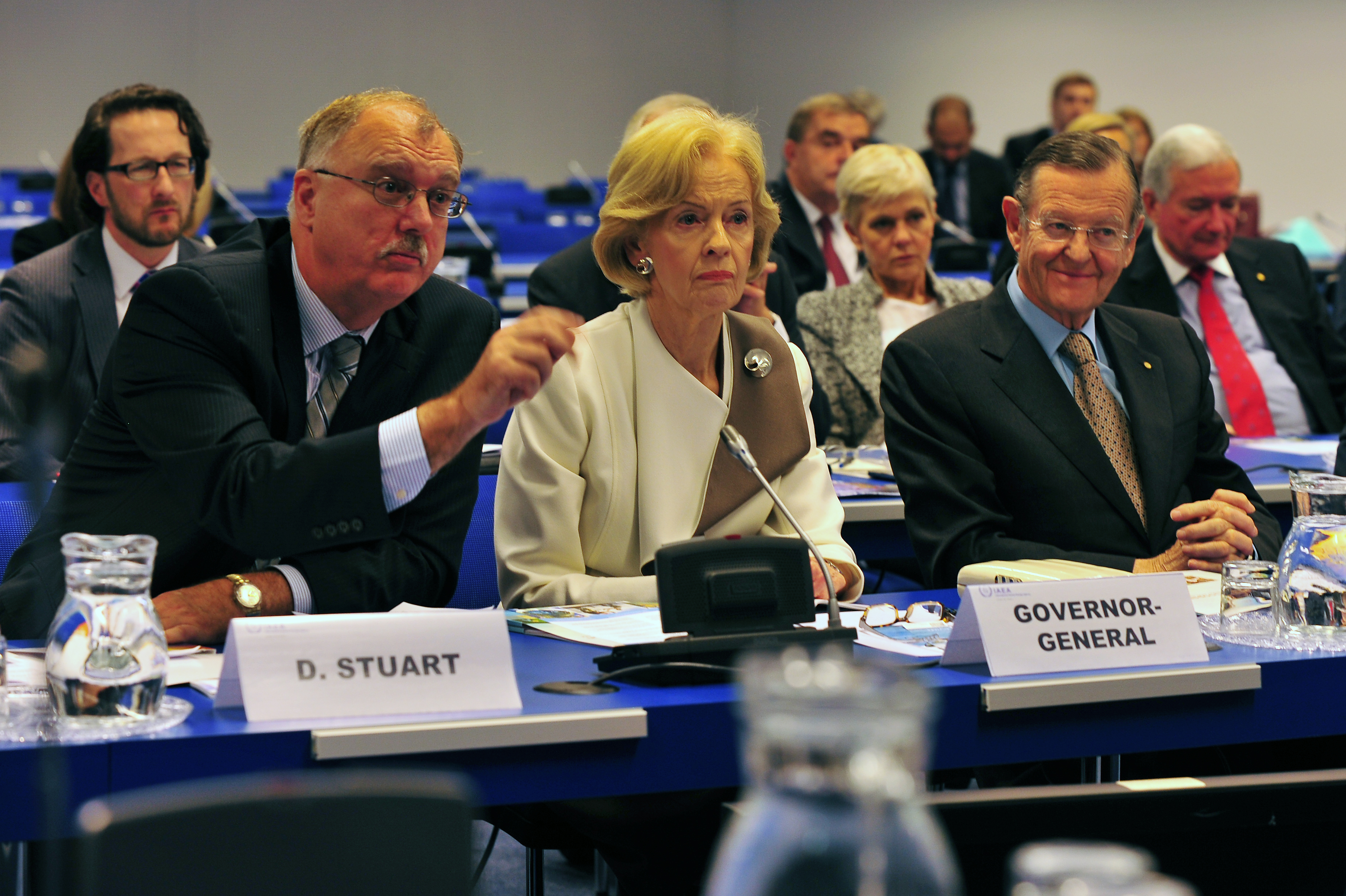
- Morgan (right)
- Born: Hugh Matheson Morgan; 9 September 1940 (age 86); Victoria, Australia
- Education: Geelong Grammar School
- Alma mater: University of Melbourne
- Occupations: Academic; business executive; company director
- Awards: Companion of the Order of Australia; Fellow of the Australian Academy of Technology and Engineering; Member of the Australasian Institute of Mining and Metallurgy; Complete list

Hugh Matheson Morgan (born 9 September 1940), is an Australian businessman and former CEO of Western Mining Corporation (1990 to 2003). He was President of the Business Council of Australia from 2003 to 2005. The Howard government appointed him to the board of the Reserve Bank of Australia in 1996, where he remained until 2007. He also was the Founding Chairman of Asia Society Australia.

== Career ==
Morgan was educated at Geelong Grammar School and the University of Melbourne, where he studied law and commerce. He briefly worked as a lawyer for Arthur Robinson & Co (Western Mining Corporation's law firm) then as a finance director at North Broken Hill.

=== Western Mining Corporation ===
Hugh is the son of former WMC CEO, Bill Morgan. After Bill died in the 1970s, Arvi Parbo took Hugh under his wing and in 1976 made him Australia's youngest executive director. He was 36 years old at the time.

In 1996, Morgan made the decision to spend $1.25 billion expanding the Olympic Dam mine in the far north of South Australia.

He was CEO of WMC from 1990 until his retirement in 2003.

=== Reserve Bank of Australia ===
Morgan was first appointed to the Reserve Bank of Australia in 1981, but was not reappointed after a speech delivered in 1984 attracted criticism for his characterisation of Aboriginal Australians. He was reappointed in 1996 and held the position until 2007.

== Influence on public policy ==
Morgan is a vocal member of the Liberal Party of Australia and a Fellow of the Australian Academy of Technology, Science and Engineering (ATSE). In 1993, Patricia Howard from the Canberra Times described Morgan as "an extremely high profile defender of a range of "hard" right-wing ideals" and a serial writer of letters to the editors of various newspapers. She claimed he had been "instrumental" in forming the HR Nicholls Society (an anti-arbitration group) and in funding the Centre for Independent Studies and "other right wing think tanks".

At the time of his exit from WMC Resources, Morgan was described in the Sydney Morning Herald as "a key business sounding board for the Federal Government". The former Victorian Premier Jeff Kennett considered him to be one of the most influential people in Australia. Kennett described Morgan as having a "profound influence" on Australian policy debates in a "very quiet and yet qualitative way". He influenced public policy on matters of trade, taxation, greenhouse gas emissions and native title, and during the Howard government was a frequent guest of the Prime Minister.

=== Aboriginal land rights ===
Morgan once claimed that native title threatened Australia's sovereignty, and was an outspoken opponent of Aboriginal Land Rights in the 1980s and 1990s. In the 2000s, Morgan spoke of reconciling mining with Aboriginal welfare and moderated his previously controversial commentary.

=== Opposition to action on climate-change ===
He is sceptical of global warming, opposed to the Kyoto Protocol and, as a member of the Greenhouse Mafia and president of the Lavoisier Group, was central to a campaign to prevent the Federal Liberal Government from acting to cut emissions (in collaboration with fellow former WMC executive Ray Evans).

Morgan is a member of the Saltbush Club, a group that promotes climate change denial.

=== Nuclear industrial development ===
Morgan advocates the development of nuclear power in Australia.

In June 2006, Hugh Morgan formed the company Australian Nuclear Energy with Fairfax chairman Ron Walker and fellow mining executive Robert Champion de Crespigny and planned to build nuclear power plants in Australia. Morgan has a 20% stake in the company. Controversially, prime minister John Howard revealed that he had a discussion with Walker about the company days before he announced an inquiry into nuclear power. The inquiry, known as UMPNER or the Switkowski Review went on to predict that Australia could potentially have 25 nuclear reactors producing a third of the country's electricity by 2050. Morgan was one of five individuals listed as consulting during the Switkowski Review. The others were: Morgan's former WMC colleague Ian Duncan, anti-nuclear activists Richard Broinowski and Helen Caldicott and scientist, Dr Tim Flannery.

In 2007, Morgan told The Age that he was open to possible joint ventures with "key players" in the global nuclear business, such as Melbourne businessman John White, who had spent the prior decade developing the concept of nuclear fuel leasing. At the time, Morgan believed there were future opportunities in uranium mining, nuclear waste repositories and nuclear power plants. Treasurer John Costello wished Morgan's business partner Ron Walker "good luck" after he was informed of their Australian Nuclear Energy venture.

When "conservation agreements" were made possible for "nuclear actions" under the Environment Protection and Biodiversity Conservation Act, Morgan flagged how an internationally owned nuclear waste repository could be built. One such a proposal was announced for Aboriginal land during the Howard government but did not proceed.

Morgan's nuclear industrial development plans stalled after the Labor party won the 2007 Federal election.

In 2015, his company Australian Nuclear Energy was described as being "in commercial hibernation from which it is unlikely to return."

The concept of importing spent nuclear fuel for storage and disposal in Australia was further explored during the 2015–2016 Nuclear Fuel Cycle Royal Commission in South Australia.

In January 2017, Morgan told The Australian that he planned to lobby state and Federal Australian government on the subject of nuclear power in Australia. He told the newspaper that he thought that it "ought to be back on the agenda."

== Current appointments ==
- President of the Lavoisier Group
- Trustee Emeritus The Asia Society, New York
- Chairman Emeritus of the Asia Society AustralAsia Centre
- President of the Australian German Association
- Immediate Past Chairman of the International Council on Metals and the Environment
- Chairman of BioDiem Limited
- Chairman of The Heat Group
- Member of the Trilateral Commission

== Past appointments ==
- Member of the Board of the Reserve Bank of Australia from 1996 to 2007
- President of the Australia Japan Business Co-operation Committee
- chief executive officer of Western Mining Corporation since 1990
- President of the German Australian Chamber of Industry and Commerce from 1991 to 1994
- Chairman of the World Gold Council from 1989 to 1991
- Director of the World Gold Council from 1986 to 1991
- Member of the Executive Board of CSIRO from 1978 to 1983
- President of the Australian Mining Industry Council (now the Minerals Council of Australia) from 1981 to 1983
- Director of Alcoa World Alumina & Chemicals from 1977 until 1998. Director of Alcoa Inc since 1998

== Honours ==
- 1987 - Officer of the Order of Australia (AO)
- 2001 – Centenary Medal
- 2002 – Companion of the Order of Australia (AC)
- 2007 – Order of the Rising Sun, Grand Cordon (Japan)
