= Hancock Report =

1985 Australian report on industrial relations

The Hancock Report was a report on the Australian system of industrial relations system by the central government compiled by Keith Hancock. The report argued for a centralised industrial relations system centred on award and argued against decentralisation and enterprise bargaining. The report's findings were handed down in 1985 and started a long debate over industrial relations in Australia. Most of the report's recommendations were implemented in the Industrial Relations Bill 1987 (later reintroduced with minimal changes as the Industrial Relations Bill 1988).

The Hancock Report's findings also led to the formation of the H.R. Nicholls Society, an industrial relations think tank strongly in favour of deregulation and decentralisation.
