= Henry Richard Nicholls =

Australian journalist and newspaper editor

Henry Nicholls
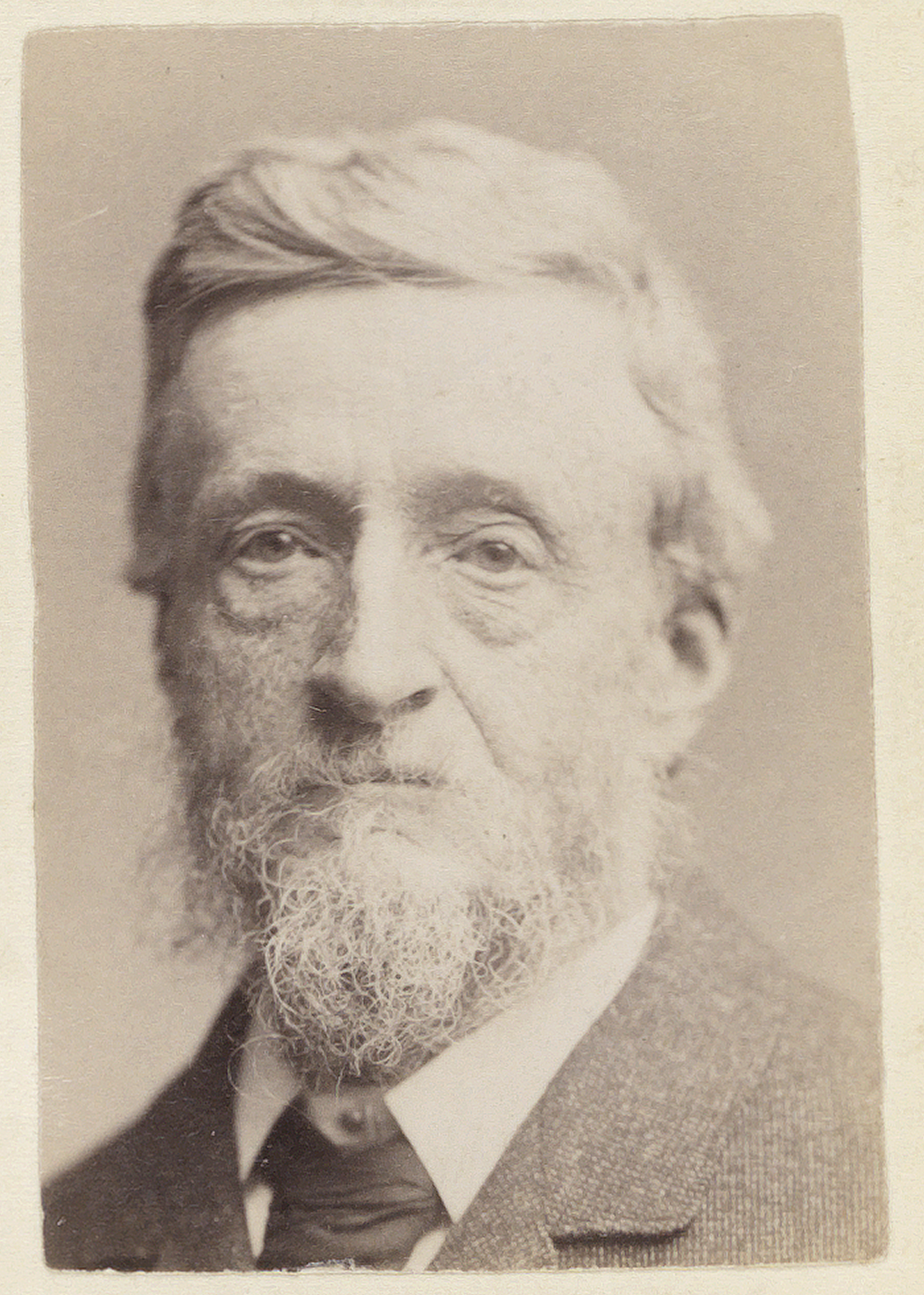
- Nicholls c. 1894
- Born: 1830; London, England
- Died: 13 August 1912 (aged 81–82); Battery Point, Tasmania, Australia
- Occupations: Journalist; Newspaper editor
- Spouse: Ellen Minchin (m. 1863)
- Relatives: Herbert Nicholls (son)

Henry Richard Nicholls (1830 – 13 August 1912) was an Australian journalist and newspaper editor. He was born in England and was active in the Chartist movement before arriving in Australia during the Victorian gold rush, where he was associated with the Eureka rebellion. He was editor of The Star in Ballarat before moving to Hobart in 1883, where he edited The Mercury until his death in 1912. The conservative H. R. Nicholls Society was named in his honour.

== Early life ==
Nicholls was born in London in 1830, the son of Ann Elizabeth (née Bright) and Henry Nicholls. His father was "a socialist and friend of many continental revolutionaries" who wrote for left-wing publications, including the Christian Socialist and The Leader, and briefly edited The Examiner.

Nicholls was educated in London and at the village of Binfield in Berkshire. He later studied French, Latin and English literature at the Westminster Mechanics' Institute. He and his older brother Charles were "ardent Chartists" and he joined his father in writing for The Leader.

== Australia ==
=== Victoria ===
Nicholls arrived in Australia in 1853 during the Victorian gold rush, in the lead-up to the Eureka Rebellion. He and George Black, a fellow Chartist, established the anti-government Diggers' Advocate in Ballarat, which lasted only until August 1854. He was joined by his brother Charles in November 1854. They enrolled at the Eureka Stockade the following month, but "left before the attack because they were appalled by the lack of discipline".

After the rebellion was quashed, Nicholls and his brother joined John Basson Humffray in petitioning Governor Charles La Trobe for an amnesty for the rebels. He subsequently mined at Creswick for a period, where he was the local correspondent for the Ballarat Times. He later joined The Star as editor and eventually took over its ownership, initially as sole proprietor from 1875 to 1880 and then in partnership with William Bramwell Withers and E. E. Campbell until 1883.

=== Tasmania ===
In 1883, Nicholls moved to Hobart and took over the editorship of The Mercury. He would remain as editor until his death in 1912. He also wrote for The Argus and The Australasian under the pen name "Henricus".

In 1911, Nicholls published an editorial titled "A Modest Judge", which was critical of H. B. Higgins, a High Court judge and president of the Commonwealth Court of Conciliation and Arbitration. Nicholls described Higgins as "a political judge [...] appointed because he had well-served a political party", and implied he was biased in favour of the government in his arbitration cases. Federal attorney-general Billy Hughes subsequently initiated a prosecution of Nicholls for contempt of court. In the High Court, Chief Justice Samuel Griffith ruled that Nicholls' editorial was libellous against Higgins personally but did not amount to a contempt of the court. Nicholls had withdrawn his statements and issued an apology to Higgins prior to the case.

== Views and legacy ==
In the early 1850s Nicholls published several works of poetry in Thomas Cooper's Chartist publication Cooper's Journal. His poetry advocated "republicanism and secularism mixed with anti-authoritarianism", with support for "egalitarian socialism and a rejection of modernity and industrialism". Nicholls brought his Chartist views from England to Australia, but on the Victorian goldfields found his "doctrinaire internationalism was out of touch with the inchoate local protest".

As editor of The Star, Nicholls supported constitutional democracy and opposed parliamentarians he regarded as demagogues, such as Charles Edwin Jones. He was a strong supporter of public education, advocating for the establishment of free libraries and for the admission of working-class people to universities. At The Mercury, he supported the movement for federation of the Australian colonies in the 1890s.

In 1986, the H. R. Nicholls Society, a conservative industrial relations think tank, was named in honour of Nicholls' role as defendant in the 1911 contempt of court case, which its founders viewed as an early victory against governmental overreach in industrial relations.

== Personal life ==
Nicholls married Ellen Minchin in 1863. The couple had eight children, including Herbert Nicholls who became chief justice of Tasmania. He was widowed in 1908, and died of pneumonia at his home in Battery Point on 13 August 1912.
