= The Star (Ballarat) =

Historical newspaper of Ballarat, Victoria

- Banner of The Star newspaper, Ballarat, Saturday, 22 September 1855.
- Type: Tri-weekly, then daily
- Format: Broadsheet
- Founded: 1855
- Ceased publication: September 13, 1924
- ISSN: 1838-9864
- OCLC number: 775378976
- Free online archives: The Star – 1855-1864 The Ballarat Star – 1864-1924

The Ballarat Star was a newspaper in Ballarat, Victoria, Australia, first published on 22 September 1855. Its publication ended on 13 September 1924 when it was merged with its competitor, the Ballarat Courier.

The earliest original edition of The Star, Ballarat, was discovered early in 2011 in the Australiana Reference Room of the Ballarat library. An unusual masthead caught the eye of the research librarian. Instead of the lion and unicorn crest in the first edition facsimile, this sixth edition displayed a centrepiece which was much more elaborate.

In the centre is the eight-pointed star used on the Eureka flag at the uprising nine months earlier and the motto of the British monarchy, Dieu et mon droit, in French. Above is Vita veritas, Latin meaning "Life, Truth". Underneath is Victoria, the name of the colony, separated in 1851, and named after the reigning monarch, Queen Victoria. The four-page print of this newspaper was returned from conservator in October 2011.

== History ==
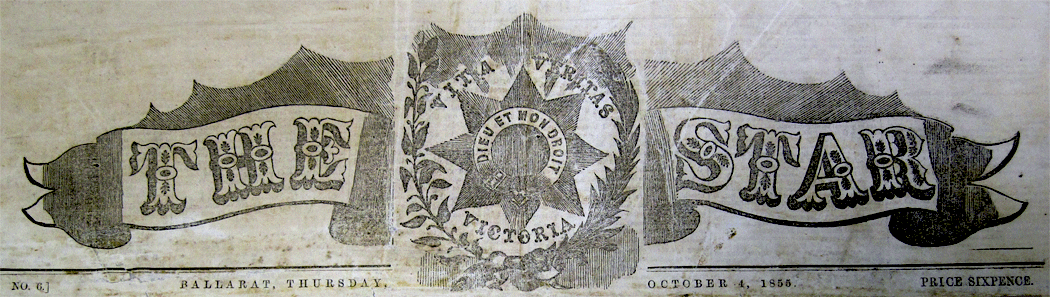
Masthead of The Star newspaper (Ballarat), sixth edition published 4 October 1855

The Star began as a tri-weekly journal until 15 December 1856 when it became a morning daily. It was Ballarat's second successful newspaper, established as a reaction to the more radical Ballarat Times whose editor and owner, Henry Seekamp, was arrested for sedition the day after the tragic storming of the Eureka stockade on 3 December 1854. In the aftermath of Eureka, twenty-five liberal-minded gentlemen each contributed £25 to bring the rival newspaper into being. They named their publication after the Star Hotel in Main Street where they met to discuss the proposal and to pledge the capital for their joint-stock venture. T. D. Wanliss was appointed business manager and the first editors were J. J. Ham and Samuel Irwin.

The first edition of The Ballarat Star gave a warning against anarchy but also stated, "Arguments, straightforward and convincing, will be the principal weapon used by us. Candour and impartiality it will ever be our endeavour to maintain, and whilst these columns are open to all, we distinctly state that we shall most assuredly be influenced by none."

== Office ==
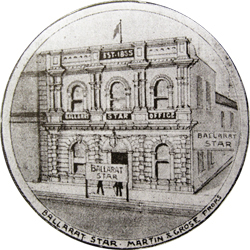
The Star office, Sturt Street, Ballarat, Victoria, Australia

Mr D. D. Wheeler, a shareholder in the first Star co-partnership, wrote: "Its first number was printed and published in the middle of a hurricane and inundation, with the printers nearly up to their middle in water." This was at the first location in Bridge Street where the Yarrowee River ran through the low-lying Ballarat Flat which was a natural flood plain and often became a sea of mining sludge. It was at the heart of the alluvial mining activity in Ballarat East.
The Star premises consisted of three small rooms, one behind the other. In the front room "copy" was produced, the second was the composing room, and the third was where the hand-worked press printed the newspapers. It was decided to move the operation to higher ground on the north side of lower Sturt Street, still in the centre of commercial activity, but in the municipal district of Ballarat West. By 1870 Ballarat's two morning papers, Star and Courier were near neighbours in lower Sturt Street and the columnists of both papers thrived on the rivalry with amusing references to the opposition.

== "Consistent advocate" ==
The men who wrote for The Star used it as a mouthpiece for the consolidation of all the diggers' newly won rights which had become the common rights of all Victorians. From the beginning the paper "maintained its position as a consistent advocate" of State policies which were a continuation of legislative reform in the best interests of its liberal readership.

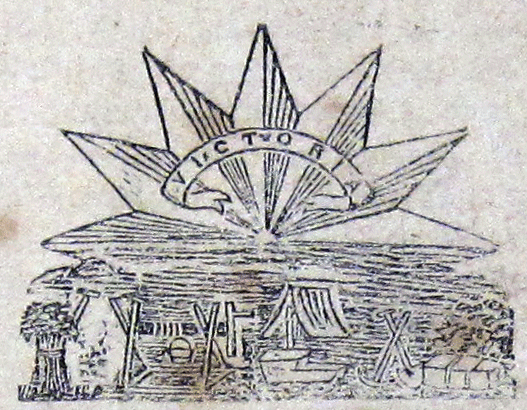
Detail of centrepiece of The Star banner (Ballarat) 1 January 1862

By 1862 The Star masthead centrepiece depicted a modified Eureka star, only one word, Victoria, and sketches depicting life in Ballarat. There is a wheatsheaf and mining icons: a windlass, tent, cradle, pick and shovel and a trunk presumably full of gold to be shipped back to the home country.

In the ensuing decades the prestige of the paper was upheld "as one of the most consistently and ably conducted organs of public opinion extant in Australia." The following reference to The Ballarat Star was reprinted from an article on Ballarat which appeared in The Illustrated Australian News of 1 August 1893, and The Melbourne Age of 5 August 1893:

The Ballarat Star, the oldest established journal in the Golden City, was first issued in 1855, in the stirring days of the gold fever, when the diggers on our premier goldfield were preparing to make history. The Star has always held a high position amongst the leading provincial journals, and is undeniably one of the best and most ably conducted daily newspapers in the colony.

In the 1896 Sands and McDougall's Ballarat Directory (p5):

The Ballarat Star claimed it "circulated amongst a mining, commercial, and agricultural population of 100,000". The Star is the oldest, most influential, and most widely read Ballarat journal.

Richard Twopeny wrote in Town Life in Australia in 1883:

Nearly everybody can read, and nearly everybody has leisure to do so. Again the proportion of the population who can afford to subscribe to newspapers is ten times as large as in England; hence the number of sheets issued is comparatively much greater.

== Prices ==
The Star banner Ballarat, Wednesday, 1 January 1862

The price for a copy of the Ballarat Star was sixpence on 22 September 1855, 4d on 1 July 1865, 3d on 1 October 1867, 2d on 19 May 1868, 1d on 1 January 1876. In 1903 the price advertised was still one penny for "six pages daily" and "eight pages on Saturday".

== Early proprietors ==
While still in its infancy, The Star ceased to be a joint-stock company and became a privately owned partnership between T. D. Wanliss and Richard Belford, the latter moving on after only a short time.

Dates	Proprietors
1855-1870	T. D. Wanliss
1870-1875	J. Noble Wilson
1875-1880	H. R. Nicholls & Co. (H. R. Nicholls, W. B. Withers, E. E. Campbell)
1880-1881	a joint-stock company (R. M. Serjeant chairman, H. R. Nicholls manager)
1881-1882	Russell King Hall
1882-1884	J. A. Powell
1884	Robert Ernest Williams
1884 July	Francis Nicholas Martin and Edward Grose [also Gross] purchased The Ballarat Star

== Archives ==
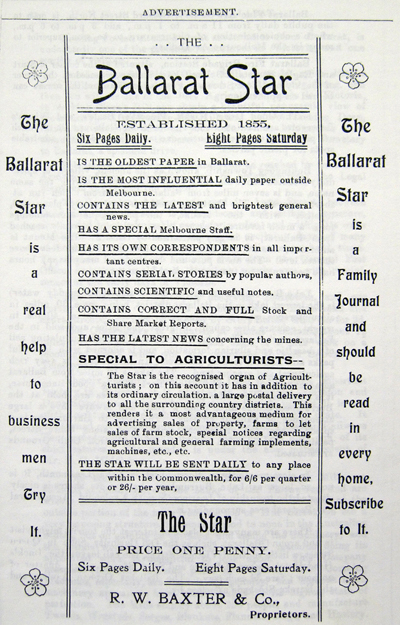
Advertisement for The Ballarat Star in Ballarat & District Directory 1903, Harry Tulloch

=== Print ===
- The Australiana Research Room of the Ballarat Library holds an early original edition of The Star, Ballarat, 6th edition, dated Saturday, 4 October 1855. As of 2011 it has not been microfilmed.
- The Ballaarat Mechanics' Institute holds original editions of The Ballarat Star from June 1859 to 13 September 1924.
- State Library of Victoria holds the full date range for The Ballarat Star from 22 September 1855 to 13 September 1924 and it is the microfilmed masters from this collection that have been sent to Canberra to be digitised.\
- The microfilm held at the State Library of Victoria does not hold the full run of "The Star" Ballarat; a large number of early editions are missing (when The Star was a tri-weekly newspaper.) Hardcopy editions of a number of 'missing' editions are held in the Australiana Research Room at Ballarat Library, and these are currently (2018) being digitised and will be added to Trove soon.

=== Microform ===
- Australiana Collection of Central Highlands Regional Library Corporation (Ballarat) has microfilmed copies of The Ballarat Star from 1855 to 1924. This is the full range copied from the originals held in State Library of Victoria.
- CHRLC also has an Index to The Star 1855-1868 on microfiche.

== See also ==
- List of newspapers in Australia
