= Mica Smith =

Professor Alfred Mica Smith (c. 1843 – 14 May 1926), commonly referred to as Mica Smith, was an Australian scientist.

== History ==
Smith was born in Perth, Scotland, and educated at the Perth Academy and Owen's College, Manchester, graduating BSc with honours in chemistry from London University, later with a science degree from Victoria University, England. He undertook further studies with Robert Bunsen at the University of Heidelberg, followed by a year at Edinburgh University as research assistant to Professor Lyon Playfair. He was employed as a researcher at a galvanising works in Edinburgh and as assistant to his uncle, Dr Angus Smith, FRS., in Manchester. He was elected a Fellow of the Institute of Chemistry of Great Britain and Ireland.

After contracting some kind chronic illness his doctors recommended a long sea voyage, so settled on Melbourne, Victoria, where he made acquaintance of George Foord FCS., (Note: Foord was an assayer in the Victorian goldfields, later at the Royal Mint, Melbourne. He was a member of the Victorian Institute for the Advancement of Science and the Royal Society of Victoria.) who gave him free run of his well-equipped private laboratory. He worked for some time at the Royal Mint, Melbourne, then was appointed head of staff of the School of Mines, Bendigo. Next he was appointed Professor of Chemistry and Superintendent of Laboratories at the School of Mines, Ballarat, a position he retained for 40 years.

His remains were cremated at the necropolis, Spring Vale.

== Family ==
Smith married Kate Wintle-Horne, a daughter of Captain Wintle-Horne, of the Indian Army, and niece of Sir William Horne.

- Her daughter, Katherine "Kate" Horne, married Eustace Moriarty Weston on 7 March 1896, lived at Elwood, Victoria.

They had a residence at Eyre Street, Ballarat.
