= The Courier (Ballarat) =

Australian newspaper

- Type: Daily newspaper
- Format: Compact
- Founder(s): Robert Clark; Edward J.Bateman
- Publisher: Australian Community Media
- Editor: Emily Sweet
- Founded: 1867
- Headquarters: Ballarat
- Circulation: Mon-Fri: 9200; Sat: 18,300
- ISSN: 0819-6818
- OCLC number: 215781151
- Website: thecourier.com.au

The Ballarat Courier is a newspaper circulating in the Ballarat region of regional Victoria. It is published daily from Monday to Saturday.

In 2023 the editor is Emily Sweet. The newspaper is owned by Australian Community Media.

== History ==
In 1867, Robert Clark and Edward J.Bateman established The Courier under the name of Bateman Clark & Co. The first office was located on the south side of Sturt Street, east of Albert Street. In 1871 the office moved to 24 Sturt Street and in 1889 the Clark and Bateman partnership dissolved, with Clark becoming the sole proprietor. In 1922 the newspaper became a private company called the Ballarat Courier Proprietary and a year later bought out the opposition, The Star. The Courier changed format from broadsheet to tabloid in 1944.

During and prior to 2021 the publication saw a steep decline in the publication of Letters to the Editor and Opinion. By June 2025 the newspaper had ceased to publish Letters to the Editor. No explanation was provided by the publisher.

== Coverage on Trove ==
Trove carries digitized copies of most issues of the Ballarat Courier from

- No. 722 of 1 December 1869 to 5375 of 22 September 1885 and
- 1 January 1914 to 1 January 1918

and the Ballarat Star from

- Vol X No 1 of 2 January 1865 to No 20,122 of 13 September 1924

== Endorsements ==
National election	Endorsement
2025	Labor
