= Lavoisier Group =

Climate change denial organisation

The Lavoisier Group is an Australian organisation formed by politicians and dominated by retired industrial businesspeople and engineers. It does not accept the science of global warming and works to influence attitudes of policy makers and politicians. The organisation downplays the risk of the effects of global warming, rejects the scientific conclusion that human activity causes it, and opposes policies designed to curtail it. Some members regard climate change as a "scam."

The group was named after French scientist Antoine Lavoisier (1743-1794), the father of modern chemistry who disproved the Phlogiston theory of combustion.

== Creation ==
The Lavoisier Group was created in response to submissions by the Australian Greenhouse Office to Cabinet to implement a carbon trading scheme. Its founders claimed that there had been "very little ongoing public debate about these proposals... are of the view that the science behind global warming policy is far less certain than its protagonists claim, and we also believe that the economic damage which Australia would suffer, if a carbon tax of the magnitude canvassed in AGO documents were imposed, would be far, far greater than is currently appreciated in Canberra"

Following an inaugural conference in May 1999, the group was founded in April 2000 by former Finance Minister Peter Walsh, Ian Webber, Ray Evans, Harold Clough (current Director of Institute of Public Affairs), Robert Foster and Bruce Kean, with an opening address by supporter Hugh Morgan. Secretary Ray Evans describes the 90-odd Lavoisier members as a "dad's army" of mostly retired engineers and scientists from the mining, manufacturing and construction industries, such as Garth Paltridge and Ian Plimer. The annual subscription fee is 50 dollars, and the annual budget is 10,000 dollars.

== Aims ==
The Lavoisier Group lists its aims as:

1. To promote vigorous debate within Australia on greenhouse science and greenhouse policy;
2. To ensure that the full extent of the economic consequences, for Australia, of the regime of carbon withdrawal prescribed by the yet-to-be-ratified Kyoto Protocol, are fully understood by the Australian community;
3. to explore the implications which treaties such as the Kyoto Protocol have for Australia's sovereignty, and for the GATT/WTO rules which protect Australia (and other WTO members) from the use of trade sanctions as an instrument of extraterritorial power.

== Views ==
Walsh has blamed politics for the current consensus on global warming. The group claims that many scientists choose to endorse prevailing theories of global warming to protect their research funding by the government, a view that is held by French climatologist and author Marcel Leroux, and was the subject of the book Meltdown: The Predictable Distortion of Global Warming by Scientists, Politicians, and the Media by Patrick Michaels. A supporter, former minister Tony Staley, has characterised global warming as a form of "political correctness".

== Responses ==
Author Clive Hamilton, in his book Scorcher, says that one can find the following arguments in the various papers promoted by the Lavoisier Group:

- There is no evidence of global warming.
- If there is evidence of global warming, then it is not due to human activity.
- If global warming is occurring and it is due to human activity, then it is not going to be damaging.
- If global warming is occurring and it is due to human activity, and it is going to be damaging, then the costs of avoiding it are too high, so we should do nothing.

The group's top members have denied receiving compensation from industry, unlike some global warming skeptics in the United States, who have admitted to receiving compensation by fossil fuel companies.
