= Jeff Chapman (footballer) =

Australian rules footballer

Personal information
- Full name: Jeff Chapman
- Born: 22 February 1948 (age 78)
- Original team: Carey Grammar
- Height: 182 cm (6 ft 0 in)
- Weight: 84.5 kg (186 lb)

Playing career^{1}
Years	Club	Games (Goals)
1966	Melbourne	2 (2)
- ^{1} Playing statistics correct to the end of 1966.

Jeff Chapman AM (born 22 February 1948) is a former Australian rules footballer who played with Melbourne in the Victorian Football League (VFL). He is also the founder of the Bangarra Group, a private family office that owns Bennelong Funds Management, a business in the financial sector, and the Bennelong Foundation, a philanthropic foundation.

On 26 January 2019, Chapman was appointed as a Member (AM) in the General Division of the Order of Australia as part of the Australia Day honours, receiving the award "for significant service to the community through philanthropic initiatives".
