= Weston Bate =

Australian historian (1924–2017)

Weston Bate OAM
- Born: Weston Arthur Bate; 24 September 1924; Melbourne, Victoria
- Died: 31 October 2017 (aged 93)
- Awards: Ernest Scott Prize (1979); Medal of the Order of Australia (1997)

Academic background
- Education: University of Melbourne (MA)

Academic work
- Institutions: Deakin University (1978–89); University of Melbourne (1952–74)
- Main interests: Australian cultural history Local history

Weston Arthur Bate OAM (24 September 1924 – 31 October 2017) was an Australian historian.

Bate served in the Royal Australian Air Force during the Second World War. He studied at the University of Melbourne under Manning Clark, Max Crawford, Kathleen Fitzpatrick and John O'Brien. He taught at Brighton Grammar School, Melbourne Grammar School, Bradfield College (Berkshire), and (from 1952 to 1976) at the University of Melbourne. From 1978 until 1989 Bate held the foundation chair of Australian Studies at Deakin University, Geelong.

Bate was President of the Royal Historical Society of Victoria. He died in October 2017 at the age of 93.

== Early life ==
Weston Arthur Bate was born on 24 September 1924 in Mont Albert, a suburb of Melbourne, to Ernest Bate (1883–1974) and Mary "Molly" Olive Akers. His mother was from California, while his father was born in Lancashire and served as Chief Electrical Engineer of the State Electricity Commission of Victoria from 1936 to 1950.

== Bibliography ==
- A History of Brighton (1962)
- Lucky City: The First Generation at Ballarat, 1851–1901 (1978)
- Dilemma at Westernport: A Case Study in Land Use Conflicts and the Growth of the Planning Imperative (1978, with Fay Marles)
- Private Lives – Public Heritage: Family Snapshots As History (1986, with Euan McGillivray and Matthew Nickson)
- Victorian Gold Rushes (1988)
- Having a Go: Bill Boyd’s Mallee (1989, with Bill Boyd)
- Light Blue Down-Under: The History of Geelong Grammar School (1990)
- Life after Gold: Twentieth-Century Ballarat (1993)
- Essential But Unplanned: The Story of Melbourne’s Lanes (1994)
- Here’s to Grandpa!: The Watercolours 1900–1940 of C.A. Wilson (1995)
- Sustaining Their Dream: The Metropolitan Golf Club 1901–2001 (2001)
- Challenging Traditions: A History of Melbourne Grammar (2002)
- Heads, You Win!: A History of the Barwon Heads Golf Club (2007)
