= H. R. Nicholls Society =

Australian think tank

The HR Nicholls Society
- Established: 1986
- Chair: Frank Parry KC
- Website: www.hrnicholls.com.au/

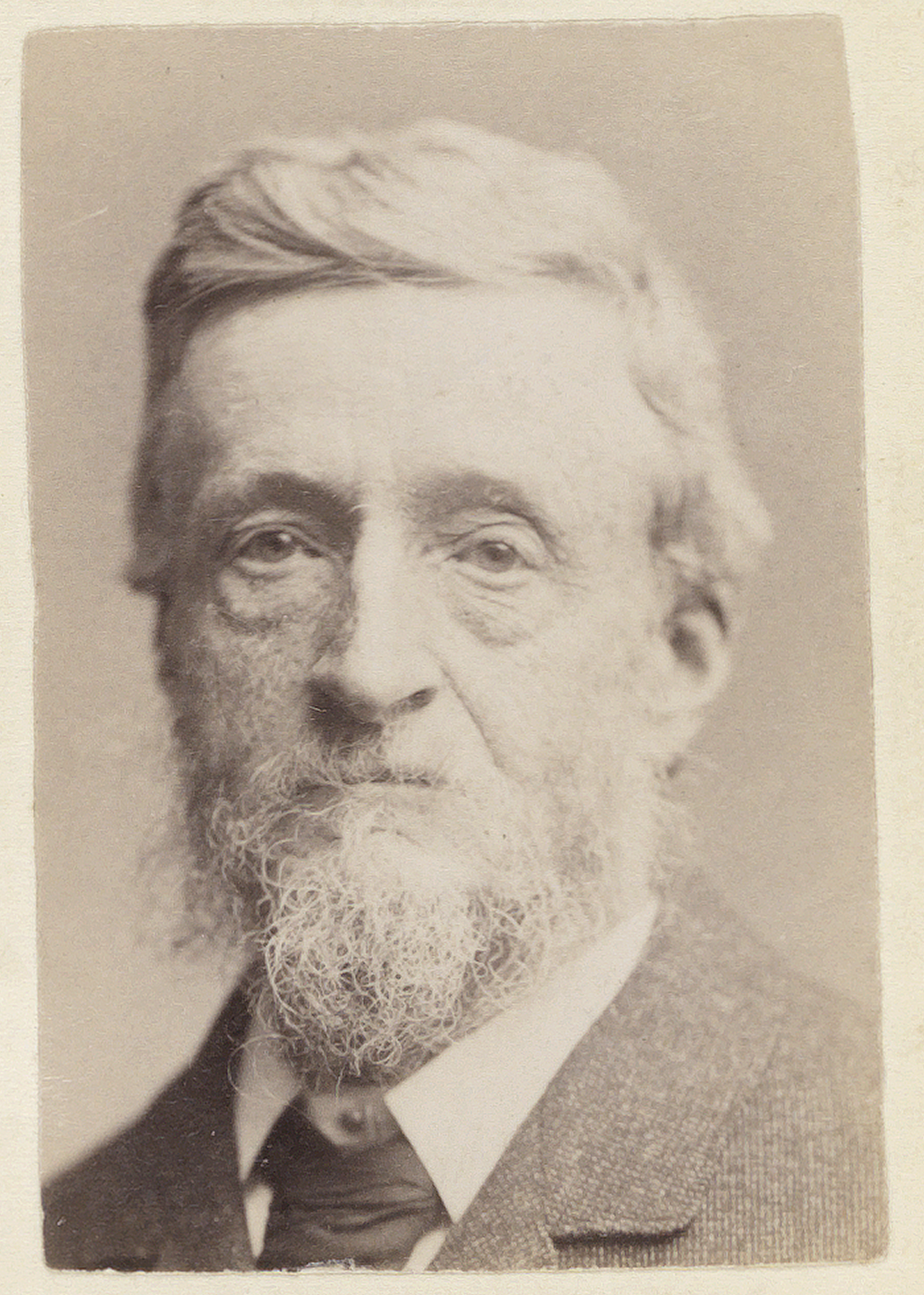
Henry Richard Nicholls, c. 1894

The HR Nicholls Society is an Australian advocacy organisation focused on industrial relations reform, founded in March 1986 by Ray Evans, an Australian businessman and political campaigner.

The society advocates for the deregulation of Australia's industrial relations system, including the abolition of the award system and the use of individual employment contracts. The society is led by executive director James Mathias, appointed in February 2026.

Regular contributors to the society's publications have been Ray Evans, Adam Bisits and Des Moore, the director of the Institute for Private Enterprise. Adam Bisits was the president of the society until 2017, replacing Evans, who stepped down in 2010.

== History ==
=== Founding ===
The society is named after Henry Richard Nicholls, an editor of the Hobart newspaper The Mercury, who in 1911 was prosecuted for contempt of court after publishing an editorial critical of H. B. Higgins, then President of the Commonwealth Court of Conciliation and Arbitration, accusing Higgins of behaving in a politically partisan and unjudicial manner after attacking a barrister. Nicholls was acquitted by the full bench of the High Court.

The society was established in March 1986 following a seminar organised by Evans, John Stone, Peter Costello, and Barrie Purvis to discuss the Hancock Report and industrial relations reform.

=== Activities and growth ===
In early 2006, federal finance minister Nick Minchin caused controversy in a speech at a society function, acknowledging that the public did not support the Coalition government's industrial relations agenda but arguing that reform must continue.

In 2007, the society criticised the Howard government's WorkChoices legislation arguing that rather than deregulating the labour market, it had created more regulation. The society compared the model to 'the old Soviet system of command and control' and criticised it on federalist grounds for centralising power in Canberra. Society President Ray Evans warned that Howard had 'assumed an omnipotence that Labor will inherit and to which no mortal should aspire.'

=== Decline and revival ===
After a period of declining activity, the Society last held a conference in 2017 and lost much of its membership. In June 2023, The Australian Financial Review reported that Victorian Liberal MP Louise Staley would seek to lead a revival of the society. The revived society would "support growing business opposition to Labor's upcoming laws to regulate gig workers, labour hire and casual employment".

In February 2026, the society appointed James Mathias, a former Coalition staffer and deputy director of the Menzies Research Centre, as its new executive director. As of 2026, the society's membership is estimated at fewer than 200.

== Positions and advocacy ==
The society advocates for the deregulation of Australia's industrial relations system, including the abolition of the award system, the widespread use of individual employment contracts, and lower minimum wages. It argues that excessive regulation and inflexible employment conditions lead to higher unemployment and lower productivity, and has consistently framed its agenda in terms of Australia's international competitiveness.

The society's stated objectives include promoting discussion of industrial relations, supporting the rule of law for both employers and employee organisations, reforming the wage-fixing system, and ensuring labour relations support economic development.

== Influence and reception ==
In 1986, then Prime Minister and former president of the Australian Council of Trade Unions, Bob Hawke, branded the Society as a group of "political troglodytes and economic lunatics".
