= Eureka Centre =

Museum in Ballrat, Victoria, Australia

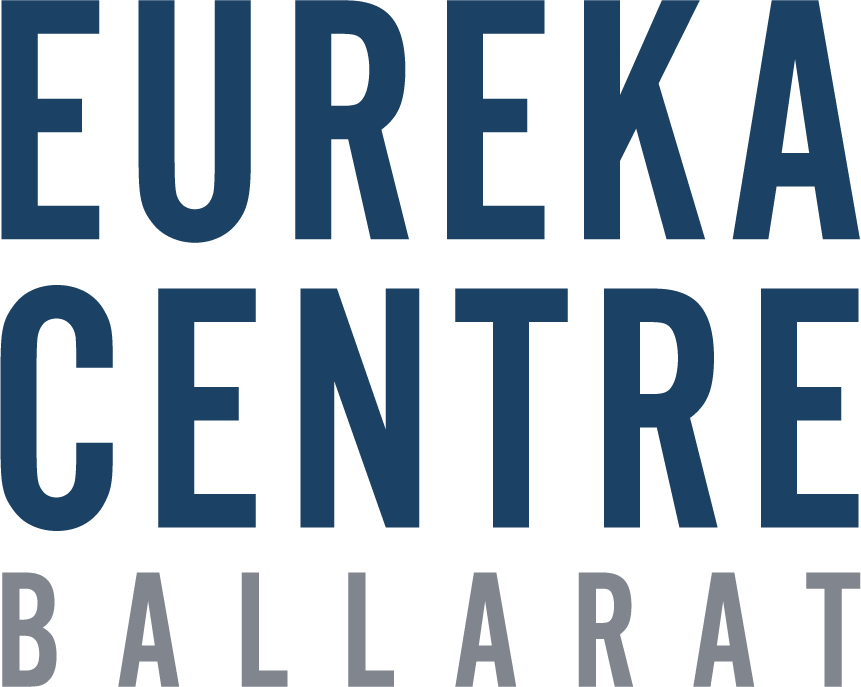

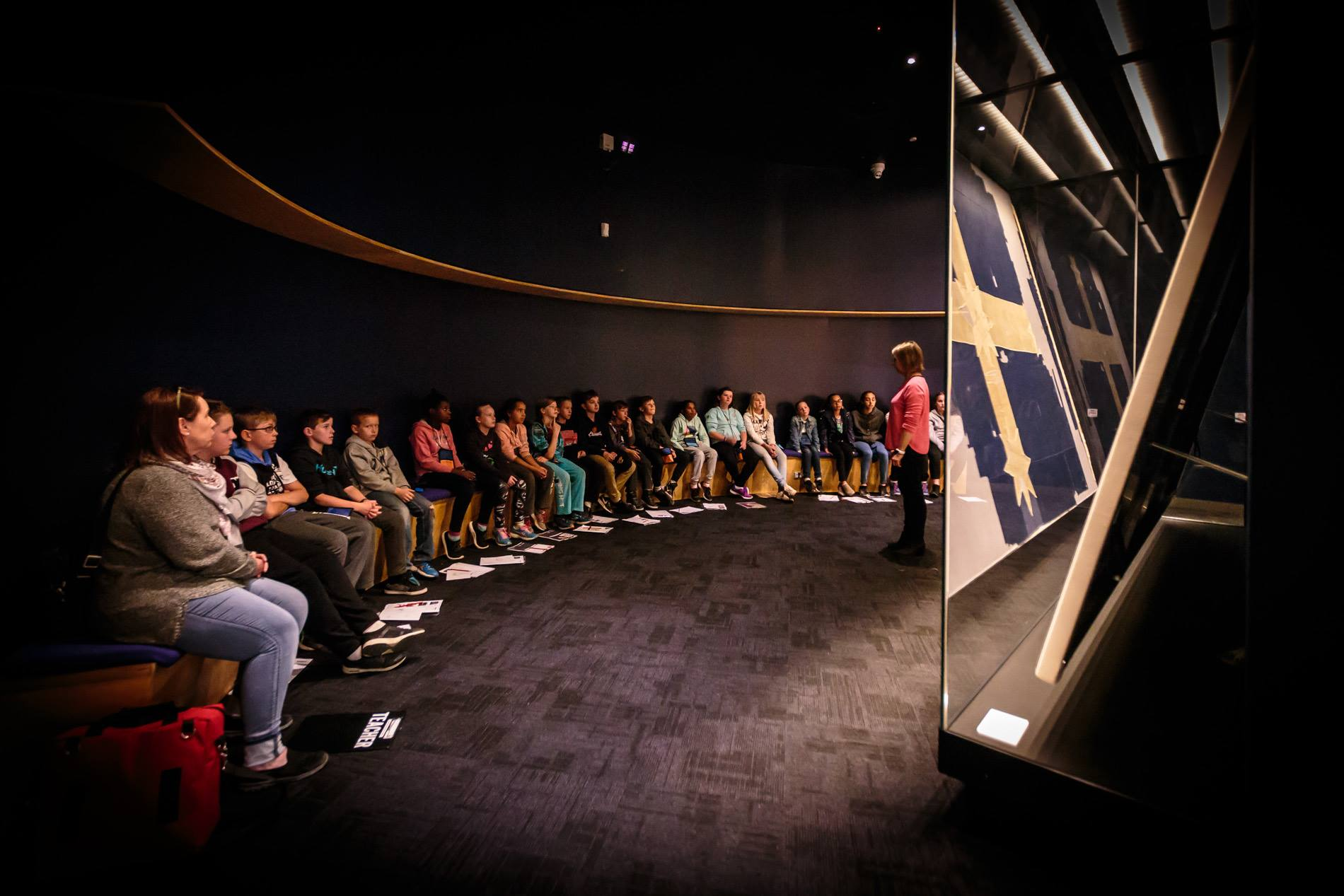
- Talk at the Flag Room in 2018
- Established: 2018
- Location: Eureka Stockade Memorial Park; Ballarat, Victoria, Australia
- Coordinates: 37.565°S 143.884°E
- Visitors: 68,000 per annum

Eureka Centre Ballarat is an interpretive centre in the Eureka Stockade Memorial Park. It features a small permanent exhibition on the Eureka Rebellion and houses the Eureka Flag, which has been on loan from the Art Gallery of Ballarat since 2013. It also hosts lectures and a café, Lilly's at Eureka.

The first museum on the site, the Eureka Stockade Centre, opened in 1993. It was replaced by the privately owned Museum of Australian Democracy at Eureka (MADE) in 2013. The City of Ballarat closed MADE in 2018. The mayor said its $1 million annual operating costs were not justified due to declining visitor numbers. The city began developing the current Eureka Centre the same year.

== Precursors ==
=== Eureka Stockade Interpretive Centre ===
Designed by the firm Cox Sanderson Ness, the Eureka Stockade Interpretive Centre finished construction in 1997. It was officially opened on 27 March 1998 in a ceremony by Premier Jeff Kennett. His call for the Eureka Flag, displayed at the Art Gallery of Ballarat, to be rehoused the centre was met with community backlash.

Despite Kennett's hopes for a "tourism icon", the original Eureka Centre was not financially successful. It was dwarfed in visitor numbers by Sovereign Hill and the art gallery. Sovereign Hill, which operated the centre, transferred management to the City of Ballarat after the first four years.

=== Museum of Australian Democracy (MADE) ===
Between 2011 and 2013, the Eureka Centre was redeveloped into the Museum of Australian Democracy (MADE). This development was funded by $5 million from both the Australian and Victorian governments and $1.1 million from the City of Ballarat. The building was designed by architects Beveridge Williams and included a 114-seat theatre, and a cafe. It was originally anticipated that annual visitation would reach 125,000. In 2017, the museum reached a record 68,000 visitors.

The Museum of Australian Democracy at Eureka was established as an independent not-for-profit organisation with a board of directors and with tax deductible charity status. Its sole member was the City of Ballarat. During its five-year existence, the museum had two Chairs of the board: Professor David Battersby AM and Kaaren Koomen AM. MADE's was supported by three notable patrons: Lucy Turnbull AO, Rob Knowles AO and former Victorian Premier Steve Bracks AC. Peter FitzSimons AM was an Ambassador for the museum.

The museum received an annual grant from the City of Ballarat of approximately $1 million. The museum also received triennial funding from Creative Victoria's OIP grant program and the Department of Education and Training, as well as other donors. The museum's annual turnover was approximately $2 million and in each year of operation it posted a financial a surplus.

MADE's launch on 4 May 2013 was hampered by budget overruns and long delays.

At its February 2018 Ordinary Council Meeting, the City of Ballarat Council made the decision to take over management responsibility of the centre. The decision came after lengthy consideration of a feasibility study prepared for Council on the future of the museum.

The Museum of Australian Democracy ceased trading on 31 March 2018. Following MADE's closure, a public lobby group called for the return of the flag to the Art Gallery of Ballarat. The public debate over the MADE site and the Eureka story also continued. The Council took over the centre, continuing to exhibit the flag, and engaged the Ballarat community to determine the next steps for a community centre based on the site. The Museum of Australian Democracy voluntarily deregistered with ASIC in May 2018, after transferring its assets to the City of Ballarat and de-accessioning its collection, returning borrowed and donated objects to donors.

== MADE Exhibitions and Awards (2013-2018) ==
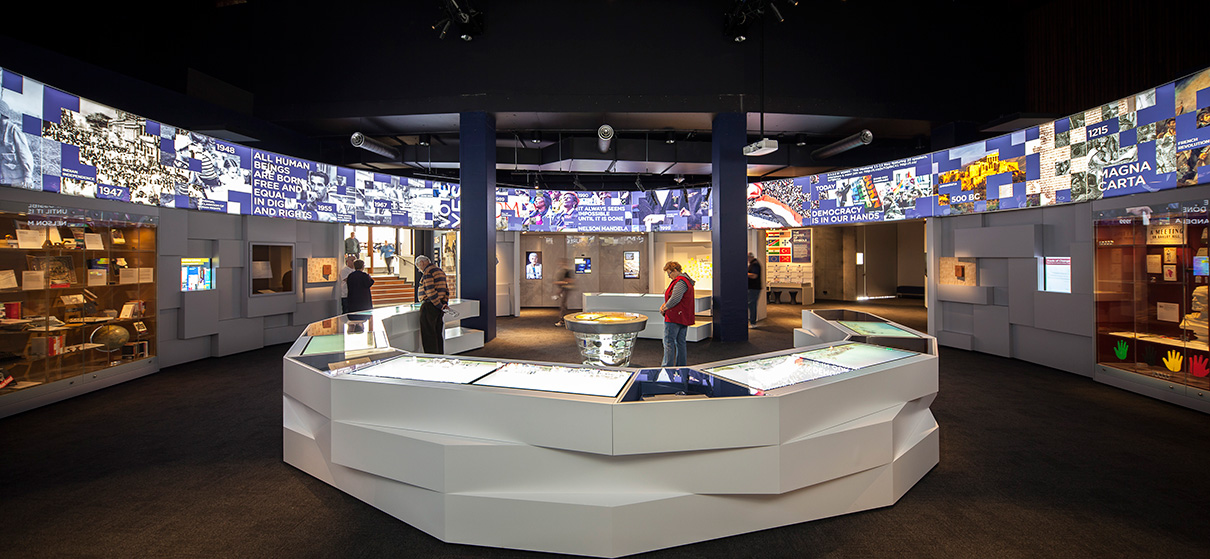
The displays at MADE used digital technology to tell stories and discuss democracy.

MADE explored the powerful story of the Eureka Stockade and life on the Gold Fields in the 1850s as a significant part of the struggle for peoples' rights in Australia and around the world. MADE commemorated the pivotal role of the Stockade in shaping Australia's democracy. This is where a group of largely young people fought injustice, and won some of the first democratic rights in the world. The key feature of the exhibition was the original Eureka Flag that was first flown at the site of the centre during the Eureka Rebellion in 1854.

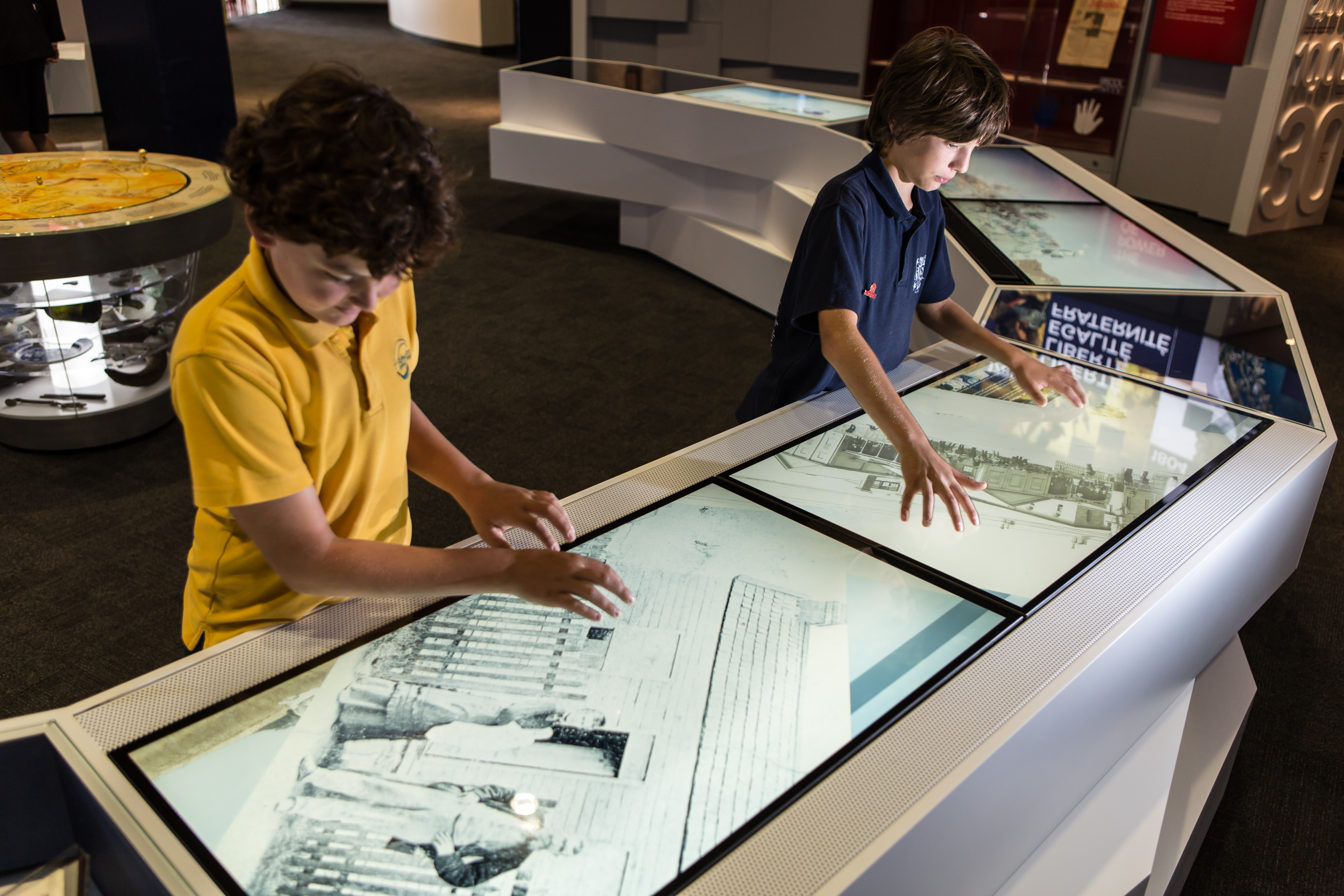
The museum used digital technology and touch screens to tell the stories of the Eureka Stockade.

Through a series of public programs and temporary exhibitions, visitors were inspired to explore diversity, creativity and the hidden stories of the past and present. As a centre of discussion on contemporary democracy, MADE hosted some of Australia's most creative thinkers through partnerships with The Wheeler Centre and Melbourne Writers Festival. In its time, the museum welcomed Anne Summers, Yassmin Abdel-Magied, Clare Wright, Deng Adut, Gail Kelly and many more.

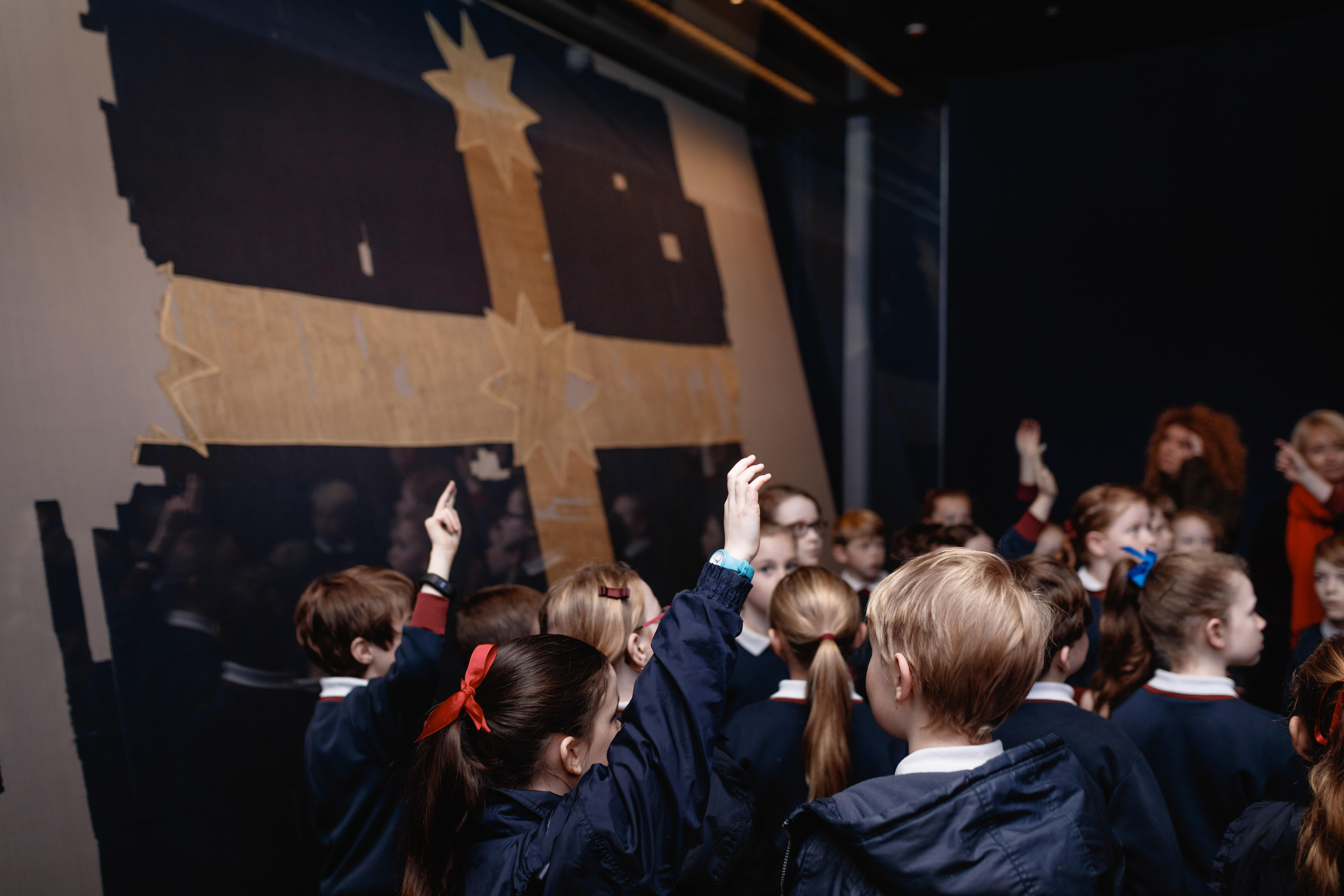
Students learn about the Eureka flag and the Eureka Stockade.

The museum also housed the Quilt of Hope, a community art project created by the Moving Towards Justice group which commemorated the lives of victims of institutional sexual abuse in Ballarat. After the museum was closed, the Quilt of Hope was donated to the Museum of Australian Democracy at Old Parliament House in Canberra.

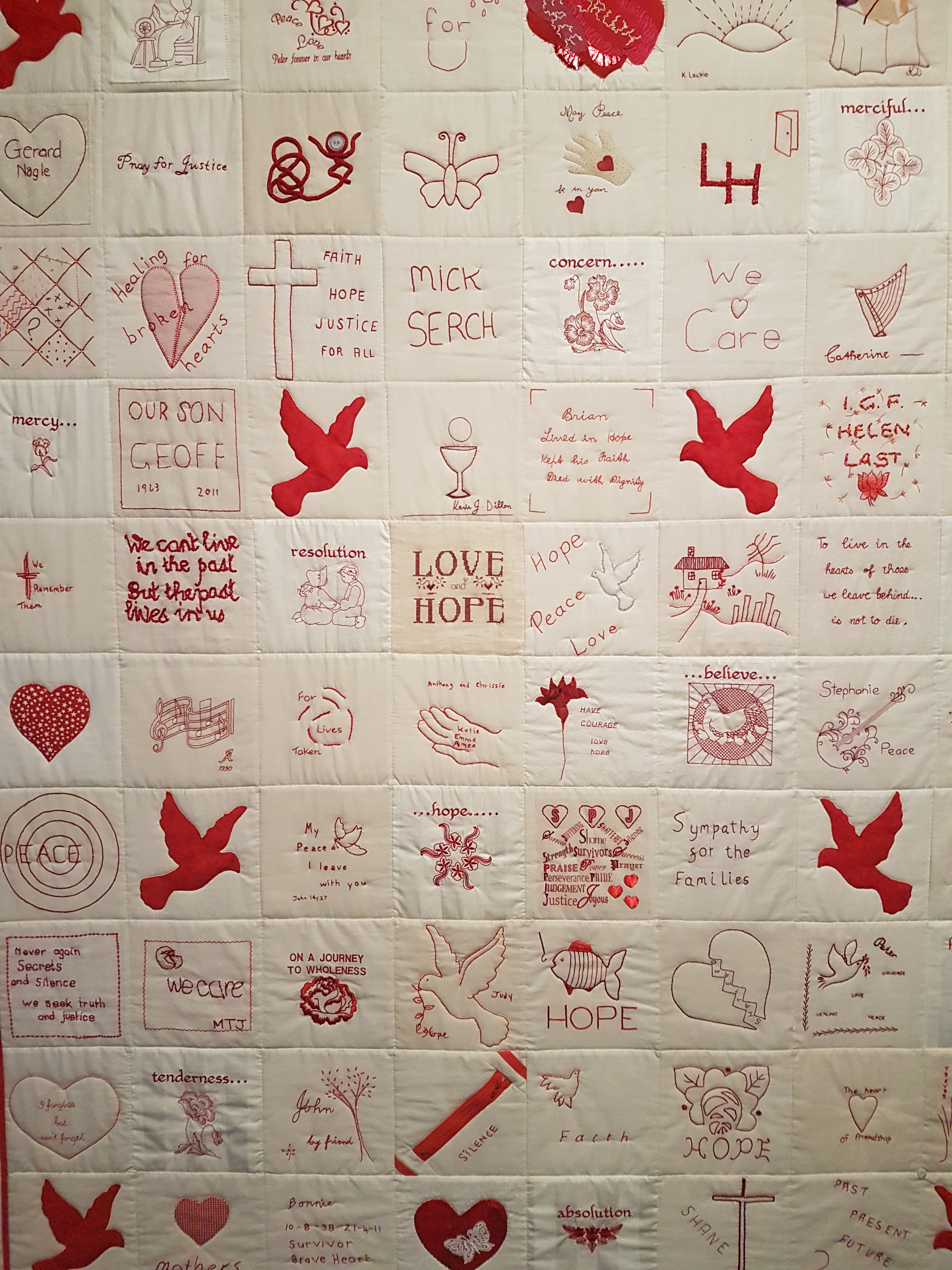
Quilt made to commemorate the victims of institutional sexual abuse in Ballarat.

The museum's regular exhibitions brought wide praise, including

- The Campaign for Disability Rights: Grassroots Democracy
- Bling which brought together Gold Fields jewellery for the first time in 2016
- Chinese Fortunes which examined the migration experience from China. Chinese Fortunes travelled to The Immigration Museum in Melbourne and the Kyneton Museum, in regional Victoria.
- Our Wonderful World
- Roses from the Heart
- Historyonics: the Monster Petition
- Eureka Day anniversary celebrations, particularly the 160th anniversary and the recreation of the Eureka Flag by descendants.
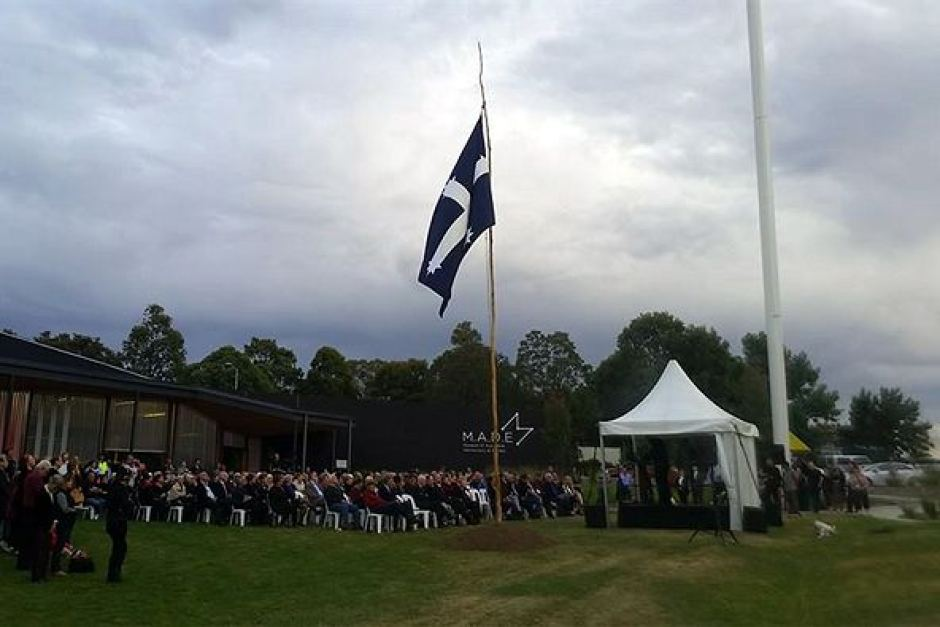
  Anniversary of the Eureka Stockade at MADE

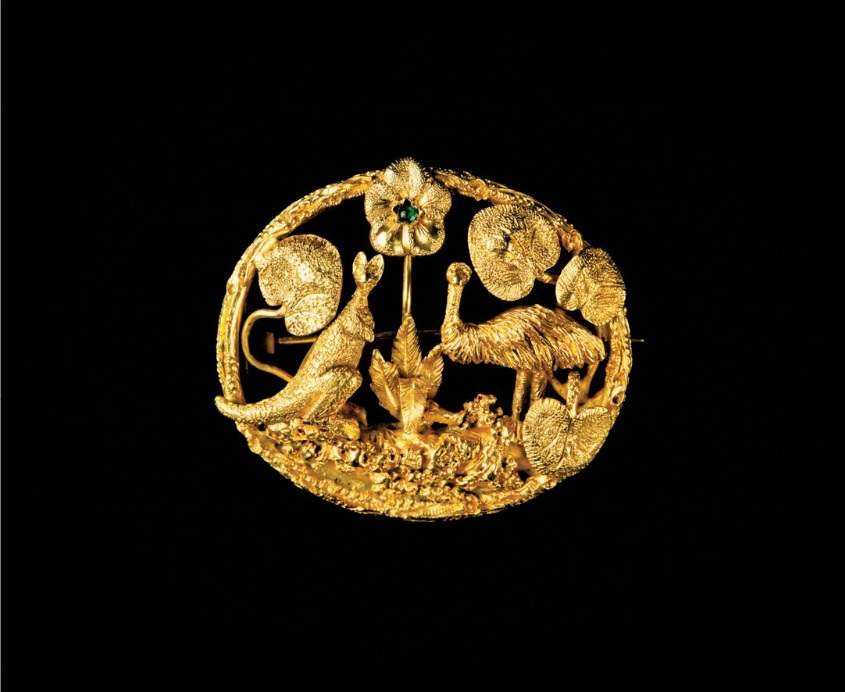
Brooch from the MADE exhibition Bling, examining jewellery from the Gold Fields.

Between its opening in 2013 and closure in 2018, the Museum of Australian Democracy at Eureka had more than 262,000 visitors, with almost 40,000 visits from students attending the highly regarded primary and secondary schools program.

During its five years of operation, MADE won a number of awards:

- 2017 Commerce Ballarat's Visit Ballarat Business Excellence Awards for Special Events and Attractions
- 2015 Winner for Innovation in the MAGNA Awards run by Museum and Galleries National for the Eureka Day 160th Anniversary Program
- 2013 Achievement Award for Excellence in category of Partner, VCAL promotion from the Victorian Curriculum and Assessment Authority
- 2013 Eureka Democracy Award from Eureka's Children.

== Controversies ==
Many people in Ballarat remember fondly the Eureka Centre, a tourism and visitor centre which at its peak attracted 25,000 people each year. The Eureka Centre was home to a diorama which explained the Eureka Stockade. The diorama disappeared in the development of the Museum of Australian Democracy at Eureka and has become a local Ballarat mystery.

The museum's initial development ran over budget and caused ongoing political ramifications in the media and in public discourse.

In November 2017, cafe owner Saltbush Kitchen decided to discontinue its presence at MADE after months of uncertainty over the museum's future.

In early 2018, Federal MP, Catherine King gave a speech in federal parliament accusing the City of Ballarat of changing its priorities in relation to MADE's funding arrangement.

Three weeks prior to the City of Ballarat's vote on the future of the museum, Deputy Mayor Daniel Moloney resigned from the board of MADE, citing conflicts of interest.
