= Tracy Stone-Manning =

American policy advisor (born 1965)

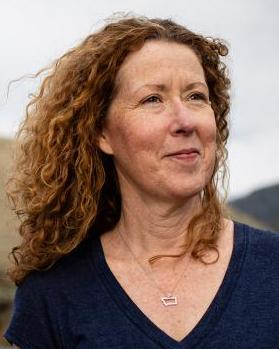

Director of the Bureau of Land Management
- In office October 27, 2021 – January 13, 2025
- President: Joe Biden
- Preceded by: Neil Kornze (2021)
- Succeeded by: Steve Pearce

Director of the Montana Department of Environmental Quality
- In office January 2013 – November 2014
- Governor: Steve Bullock
- Preceded by: Richard Opper
- Succeeded by: Tom Livers

Personal details
- Born: Tracy Stone; 1965 (age 60–61) Springfield, Virginia, U.S.
- Spouse: Richard Manning
- Education: University of Maryland, College Park (BA); University of Montana (MS)

Tracy Stone-Manning (born 1965) is an American environmental policy advisor who served as the director of the Bureau of Land Management in the Biden administration from 2021 to 2025. Stone-Manning is the President of The Wilderness Society.

== Early life and education ==
Stone-Manning was born in Springfield, Virginia. She earned a Bachelor of Arts degree in radio, television, and film from the University of Maryland, College Park, and a Master of Science in environmental studies from the University of Montana.

== Career ==
From 1999 to 2006, Stone-Manning was the director of the Clark Fork Coalition, an environmental protection organization based in Missoula, Montana. She joined the U.S. Senate office of Jon Tester, serving as his regional director from 2007 to 2012 and acting state staff director and senior advisor in 2012.

Upon taking office, Governor Steve Bullock appointed Stone-Manning to succeed Richard Opper as director of the Montana Department of Environmental Quality. From January 2013 to November 2014, Stone-Manning served as the director. From November 2014 to December 2017, she was the chief of staff for Montana Governor Bullock. From 2017 to 2021, Stone-Manning worked for the National Wildlife Federation, first as associate vice president for public lands and then as a senior advisor for conservation policy.

=== Directorship of Bureau of Land Management ===
President Joe Biden nominated Stone-Manning for director of the Bureau of Land Management on April 22, 2021. Hearings on her nomination were held on June 8, 2021. The committee deadlocked on her nomination on July 22, 2021, forcing the entire Senate to discharge the nomination. On July 27, 2021, the United States Senate voted 50–49 on the motion to discharge her nomination from the Senate Committee on Energy and Natural Resources. On September 30, 2021, the Senate confirmed her nomination by a vote of 50–45. Those who had voted against her were uniformly Republican; some stated that her earlier connection to what they said was "eco-terrorism" was disqualifying.

She started work on October 7, 2021, and was sworn in on October 27. Stone-Manning served as director for the remainder of the Biden administration, officially leaving office on January 13, 2025.

=== Post-government career ===
Following the conclusion of her tenure at the Bureau of Land Management, Stone-Manning was named President of The Wilderness Society, officially taking office on February 24, 2025. In February 2026, she joined a cross-partisan advisory council alongside former government officials, including John Podesta and Lynn Scarlett, to launch "Ground Shift," an initiative aimed at reforming statutory policies governing public lands and waters in the United States.

On September 4, 2026, the House Committee on Natural Resources opened an oversight inquiry into The Wilderness Society and other environmental nonprofit organizations regarding their influence over the federal government, law, and natural resources policy. The committee sent a document request to Stone-Manning in her capacity as the organization's president, including questions about its use of statutory fee-shifting provisions to recover attorney fees and other litigation costs in lawsuits against federal agencies. The panel alleged that preservationist groups wielded "outsized influence" over federal law and natural resources policy and criticized their use of such litigation practices, requesting that the organization produce internal communications regarding its court filing strategies and records concerning its recovery of litigation fees.

== Environmental activism ==
In 1989, a friend of Stone-Manning's, and fellow environmental activist, was involved in tree spiking in Idaho's Clearwater National Forest. Tree spiking is a tactic used to deter logging by rendering a tree dangerous to cut, either by a lumberjack or in a sawmill, and is considered an act of eco-terrorism. At the friend's behest, Stone-Manning wrote an anonymous, profanity-laced letter to federal officials, informing them of the tree spiking and warning that "a lot of people could get hurt" if logging were to continue. In her 1993 federal court testimony, Stone-Manning admitted that she had retyped, edited, and mailed the letter. She received prosecutorial immunity in order to testify against the activist. The activist was found guilty and sentenced to 17 months in prison.

== Personal life ==
Stone-Manning is married to Richard Manning, an environmental author and journalist. She resides in Missoula, Montana, and Washington, D.C.
