= Yassmin Abdel-Magied =

Sudanese Australian media presenter and writer

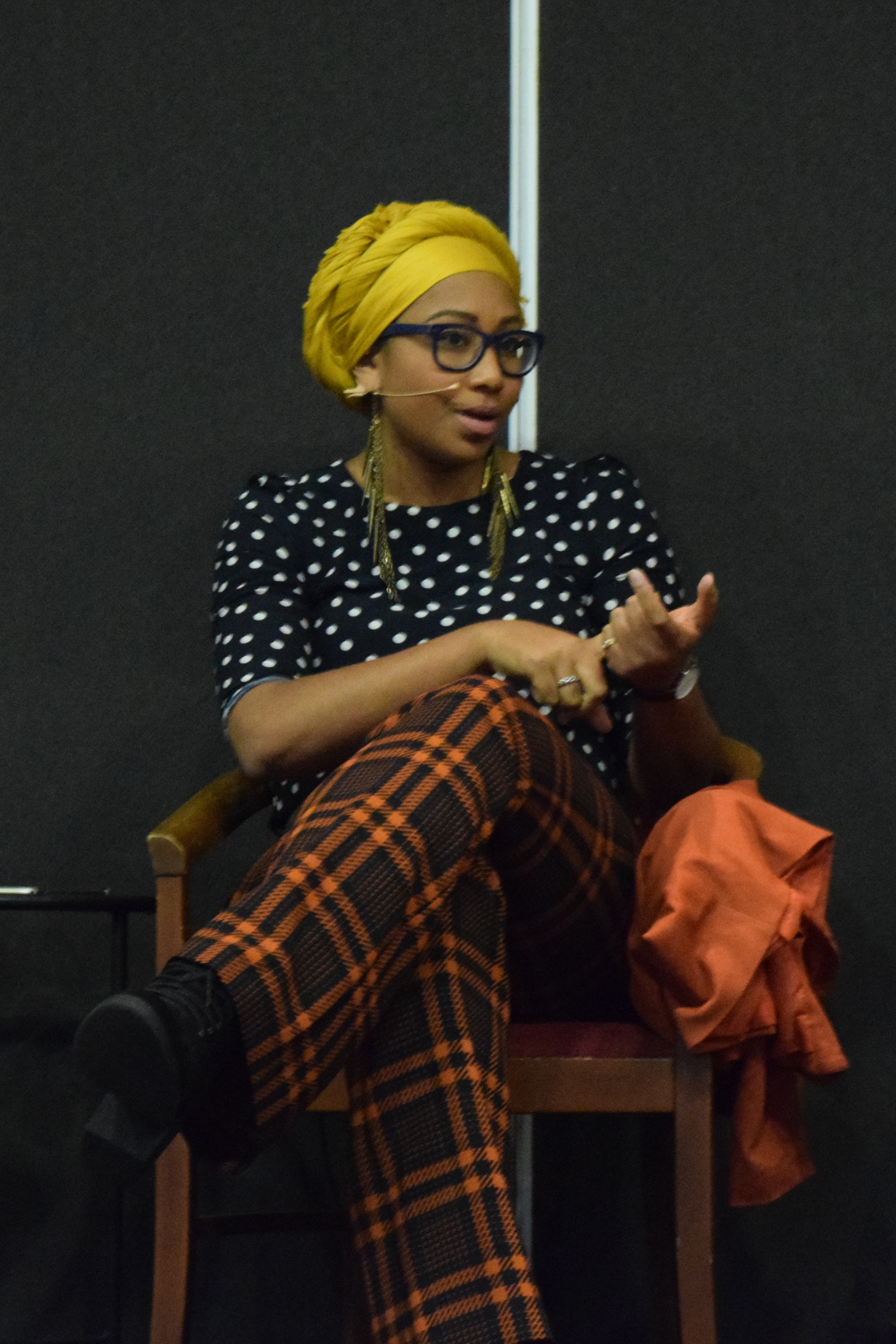
- Abdel-Magied in 2016
- Born: Khartoum, Sudan
- Citizenship: Australian and Sudanese
- Education: University of Queensland (BE; Honours)
- Occupations: Mechanical engineer, media presenter, writer
- Years active: 2007–
- Website: yassminam

Yassmin Abdel-Magied is a Sudanese media presenter and writer, who had an early career as a mechanical engineer. She was named Young Queenslander of the Year in 2010 and Queensland Australian of the Year in 2015 for her engagement in community work. Abdel-Magied has been based in the United Kingdom since 2017, after her comments about Sharia on TV and a social media post on Anzac Day led to her being widely attacked in Australian media, a petition calling for her sacking from ABC TV, and numerous death threats on social media. She has since published many articles and books.

== Early life and education ==
Yassmin Midhat Abdel-Magied was born in Khartoum, Sudan. As skilled migrants, her parents moved to Brisbane, Australia with her when she was aged 18 months in late 1992. This was after the 1989 Sudanese coup d'état in which the Islamist military toppled the democratically elected government and brought in harsh laws, such as the policing of women's clothing and mandating the speaking and teaching of Arabic in universities. Abdel-Magied's father, Midhat Abdel-Magied, completed a PhD in electrical engineering at Imperial College, London, and subsequently studied Information Technology in Australia. Yassmin's mother, Faiza El-Higzi, was a qualified architect in Sudan, and now holds postgraduate degrees across various disciplines. Yassmin has a younger brother.

Abdel-Magied attended primary school at the Islamic College of Brisbane and the independent Christian high school John Paul College, at which there was no policy against wearing a hijab. She was the first to wear a hijab at the school.

She studied mechanical engineering at the University of Queensland, graduating with a Bachelor of Mechanical Engineering with First-Class Honours in 2011.

== Community work and early career (2007–2017) ==
As high school students in 2007, Abdel-Magied and two others founded "Youth Without Borders" (YWB) in Australia, and she continued as chairperson until 2016. In 2007, she was named Young Australian Muslim of the Year. She also participated in other groups/committees and in 2010 was named Young Queenslander of the Year.

From 2012 until 2016, she worked for multinational engineering companies based in Australia.

In May 2012, Abdel-Magied posted her first blog post, titled "Dr Livingstone, I presume?" In 2013, she wrote a journal article about working "On the rigs" in the Griffith Review.

In 2015, Abdel-Magied contributed as a member of the Federal ANZAC Centenary Commemoration Youth Working Group.

After Abdel-Magied was named Queensland Young Australian of the Year in 2015, Australian Foreign Affairs Minister Julie Bishop appointed her to the Council for Australian-Arab Relations (CAAR). In late 2016, the Department of Foreign Affairs and Trade (DFAT) sent Abdel-Magied, as a CAAR board member, to several Middle Eastern countries, including Saudi Arabia, the UAE, Jordan, Egypt and Sudan, to promote Australia.

=== Media activities (2014–2017) ===
In December 2014, Abdel-Magied presented a fourteen-minute TED talk at TEDxSouthBank in Brisbane, entitled What does my headscarf mean to you?, which was chosen as one of TED's top-ten ideas of 2015.

From August 2016 to 1 July 2017, Abdel-Magied presented ABC TV human-interest show Australia Wide until the show was cancelled due to ABC program restructuring.

Other activities on Australian media have included Triple J (radio), Radio National, F1 Racing (2016 podcast), SBS TV The Truth About Racism (2017) and ABC TV's Hard Chat (2016–2017).

== Controversy (2017) ==
In June 2016 on the ABC TV program The Drum, Abdel-Magied said that Sharia law "allows for multiple interpretations... it's about mercy, it's about kindness".

In February 2017, Abdel-Magied was a panelist on the Q&A program where she was challenged about her views on Sharia law by politician Jacqui Lambie. Abdel-Magied said "Islam to me is the most feminist religion. We got equal rights well before the Europeans. We don't take our husbands' last names because we ain't their property." She said that Sharia law is as simple as "me praying five times a day," and that it says that "you follow the law of the land on which you are on". A right-wing group called "AltCon News" started an online petition after the show, calling for Abdel-Magied to be sacked from hosting the ABC TV show Australia Wide for what they saw as her "pro-Sharia law comments". The petition received more than 15,000 signatures.

On Anzac Day, 25 April 2017, Abdel-Magied posted "LEST.WE.FORGET. (Manus, Nauru, Syria, Palestine...)" on her personal Facebook page. The phrase "Lest we forget" is commonly used in war remembrance services and commemorative occasions in English-speaking countries, in particular Remembrance Day and Anzac Day. It is used to remember fallen military personnel as a mark of respect. Abdel-Magied's words in brackets referenced refugees held in detention on Manus Island and Nauru, and alleged injustices against Palestinians. The comment was criticised by many on social media as well as Minister for Immigration Peter Dutton. Abdel-Magied deleted the part in brackets soon after posting it, commenting: "It was brought to my attention that my last post was disrespectful, and for that, I apologise unreservedly." Australian Muslim leaders expressed varying views on the controversy, from support to denouncing her remarks as not reflective of the views of all Muslims.

The following day, Deputy Prime Minister Barnaby Joyce suggested the Australian Broadcasting Corporation (ABC) should take action against Abdel-Magied, and the ABC also became a target of the right-wing media. The ABC argued that Abdel-Magied's personal opinions did not represent those of the national broadcaster.

On 3 July 2017, Abdel-Magied announced in a tweet that she was moving to London, "to partake in the Aussie rite of passage". She did not specify her reasons for leaving, but after arriving in London said that it had been "exhausting" to have been the subject of controversy and that she had felt betrayed by her home country, after criticism aimed at her had been "visceral" and "more about who I am than about what is said".

An essay originally published by the Griffith Review in April 2017 was reprinted in The Guardian on 6 July, along with a short introduction describing the extremity of the behaviours to which she had been subjected. She had been trolled relentlessly after her Q&A appearance and Anzac Day post, including being sent videos of beheadings and rapes with suggestions that the same should happen to her. She was subjected to daily death threats on social media as well as abusive telephone calls, forcing her to change her phone number, move house and delete social media accounts. She later said that she had become "Australia's most publicly hated Muslim".

Some continued to threaten her publicly, including on National Radio; "She has fled the country and is blaming all of us," Prue MacSween said. "She says she’s been betrayed by Australia and didn’t feel safe in her own country. Well actually she might have been right there, because if I had seen her I would have been tempted to run her over mate."

Other commentators said that she had been the victim of "character assassination", Islamophobia and her feminism. Susan Carland likened the media frenzy after the Q&A incident to a witch-hunt, saying that The Australian ran four front pages as well as 26 editorials and opinion pieces, and every major news site in the country had run at least one piece on it. The Murdoch-owned Newscorp media had been particularly vicious in their attacks. Writer Randa Abdel-Fattah wrote "Abdel-Magied has come to represent everything that Islamophobia hates – but actually loves – about 'the Muslim problem' ", and that her critics would have preferred her to stay in Australia.

In April 2019, comedian and writer Sami Shah presented a series of radio programmes in which he investigated the concept and practice of free speech in Australia. He reported that his interviewees who were people of colour all reported experience of or a fear of "getting Yassmined", and also drew comparison with the Adam Goodes controversy in 2015. The term has been used in other sources too.

In May 2022, Abdel-Magied described how she remained traumatised by the abuse, and that she would not be returning to Australia.

== Post-relocation career (2018–present) ==
Living in London, Abdel-Magied continued to take her security very seriously, taking measures to protect her online and telephone presence. In 2018, she said there had been "a concerted effort to ruin my life, and nobody stopped them. Not the government, not advocacy groups, no one. I was out there alone".

In 2018, Abdel-Magied presented six six-minute episodes of an Islamic headwear fashion program on ABC iview. In April of the same year, Abdel-Magied appeared in her acting debut in the SBS TV series Homecoming Queens, made in her Australian hometown of Brisbane, about the lives of two young women dealing with life after major illness. Abdel-Magied played a character described as "a conceited social media lifestyle guru".

On 23 April 2018, Abdel-Magied appeared on the UK-based podcast The Guilty Feminist on the topic of identity.

At the Melbourne Writers Festival in August 2018, Abdel-Magied spoke of the grief she felt, for the loss of both her engineering career as well as her youthful optimism and innocence.

She is a contributor to Margaret Busby's 2019 anthology New Daughters of Africa, and has participated in associated events in London.

In April 2019, Abdel-Magied spoke on The Bookshow on ABC Radio National about her debut novel You Must Be Layla. The target audience is young readers, and the plot centres on a Sudanese girl who struggles to fit into her new private school. She spoke of the additional freedom afforded by fiction in expressing themes important to her.

In January 2020, the Australia Council for the Arts announced Abdel-Magied as a recipient of a A$20,000 international development writing grant and a six-month residency at the Keesing Studio in Paris. In February 2021, she started posting on Substack from Paris, after arriving there during the COVID-19 pandemic and having to undergo a period of quarantine.

Since the 2021 Sudanese coup d'état, she has frequently appeared as a media commentator on Sudanese political events, on channels such as Al-Jazeera English and TRT world. She started dedicating most of her writing on Substack to Sudan.

In May 2022, she published a collection of essays entitled Talking About a Revolution. It is divided into two sections, "The Private and Public Self", and "Systems and Society", with all of the writings linked by a broad interpretation of the term "revolution". She spoke about the book in conversation with Sisonke Msimang via live video at the Sydney Writers Festival on 21 May, and also appeared on ABC News Breakfast. In one of the essays, she writes about considering giving up her Australian citizenship, partly because she has "a real issue with the broader system of borders and citizenship and the way that inequality is baked into the nation-state"; she wanted to provoke reflection on the question "what does it mean to have an Australian citizenship?". She said she had built a life in London that she was happy with.

In February 2024, ITV Academy selected her as a writer for Emmerdale, along with Oneikah Campbell, as part of their "Original Voices" initiative. This is a paid placement alongside the scriptwriters for 12 weeks.

She has been a frequent contributor to The New Arab magazine.

Her first novel for adults, titled At Sea, was published on 2 June 2026. It is a thriller, centred on Zainab, a Muslim woman working on an offshore oil rig recently appointed as drilling operations leader of an all-male team, who discovers a potentially dangerous issue with the rig.

== Recognition and awards ==
- 2015: Queensland Young Australian of the Year
- 2022: Runner up for Riz Ahmed's inaugural Pillars Fund fellowship
- 2025: Finalist, Richard J. Margolis Award, for non-fiction writers of social justice journalism

== Personal life ==
Abdel-Magied holds dual Australian and Sudanese citizenship.

In November 2019, Abdel-Magied announced her engagement with a photo of her diamond ring on Instagram. She has since married a British man.

== Works ==
- Redefining the Narrative: Thoughts & Questions of a Young Australian Muslim Finding Her Path. Pandora Electronic Collection. 2012. OCLC 864708436. Blog.
- "On the rigs". Griffith Review (Edition 40: Women & Power). April 2013. ISBN 9781922079978. Archived from the original on 10 December 2024.
- Paddy O'Reilly, ed. (2014). It Happened in a Holden: A Celebration of Holdens and the Australians Who Drive, Ride, Love and Bicker in Them. South Melbourne: Affirm Press. Story in a collection.
- Yassmin's Story: Who Do You Think I Am?. Australia: Vintage Books. 2016. ISBN 9780857986153. OCLC 951650673. Biography.
- "A little too close to the sun: Advocacy in the modern age". Griffith Review (Edition 56: Millenials Fight Back). April 2017. ISBN 9781925498356. Archived from the original on 23 June 2024. (reprinted on The Guardian website on 6 July 2017)
- "What are they so afraid of? I'm just a young brown Muslim woman speaking my mind". The Guardian. 6 July 2017.
- Jonathon Green, ed. (Summer 2017). "Leaving For Good". Meanjin. 76 (4). Carlton, Victoria. "Yassmin Abdel-Magied recounts her many, failed, attempts to leave Australia"
- "I wanted to make jokes about my destroyed career, but all I felt was grief". The Guardian. 28 August 2018. Edited version of a speech given at the Melbourne Writers Festival.
- You Must be Layla. North Sydney: Penguin. 2019. ISBN 9780143788515. OCLC 1089827087. YA Fiction.
- Khan, Mariam, ed. (21 February 2019). "Life Was Easier Before I Was Woke". It's Not About the Burqa. Pan MacMillan. ISBN 9781509886401. (Contributor)
- Busby, Margaret, ed. (8 March 2019). New Daughters of Africa: An International Anthology of Writing by Women of African Descent. Contributor: Yassmin Abdel-Magied. Myriad Editions. ISBN 9781912408009.
- United Queendom (March 2020). Play, co-written with Anthony Spargo, produced by Les Enfants Terrible, directed by Christa Harris.
- Listen Layla. Penguin, November 2021. ISBN 9781760896065.
- Talking About a Revolution. Penguin. 31 May 2022. ISBN 9781761044595.
- (17 July 2022), Small Door, Big Man. Radio play.
- Stand Up and Speak Out Against Racism, illustrated by Aleesha Nandhra. Walker Books, September 2023. ISBN 9781536231335.
- Abdel-Magied, Yassmin (2026). Silverbrook: Yumna and the Golden Horse. London: Hachette. ISBN 9781444934625. YA Fiction.
- Abdel-Magied, Yassmin (2 June 2026). At Sea. UK: Canongate. ISBN 1837264031. Literary fiction.
