= Richard Manning =

Environmental author (b. 1951)

- Born: February 7, 1951 (age 75); Flint, Michigan
- Occupations: Author, journalist

Richard Manning (born 1951) is an American environmental author and journalist who writes about music, neuroscience, and agriculture.

== Career ==
Manning is the author of 11 books and has worked as a journalist, reporter and editor for more than 40 years, including four years at the Missoulian. In 1995 he was the recipient of a John S. Knight Fellowship from Stanford University. He is a three-time winner of the Seattle Times C.B. Blethen Award for Investigative Journalism, and also won the Audubon Society Journalism Award and the inaugural Richard J. Margolis Award in 1992.

He writes frequently about the environment, neuroscience and music. He was a senior research associate at the National Native Children's Trauma Center based at the University of Montana, where he wrote about trauma and poverty. In addition to his eleven books, his articles have been published in Harper's Magazine, The New York Times, The Los Angeles Times, Audubon and The Bloomsbury Review.

== Personal life ==
He lives with his wife, Tracy Stone-Manning, in Montana and Washington, D.C.

== Books ==
- Last Stand (1991) ISBN 978-0-87905-389-5
- A Good House (1994) ISBN 978-0-14-023407-7
- Grassland (1997) ISBN 978-0-14-023388-9
- One Round River (1998) ISBN 978-0-8050-4792-9
- Food's Frontier (2001) ISBN 978-0-520-23263-1
- Inside Passage (2001) ISBN 978-1-55963-655-1
- Against The Grain: How Agriculture Has Hijacked Civilization (2004) ISBN 978-0-86547-622-6
- Rewilding the West: Restoration in a Prairie Landscape (2009) ISBN 978-0-520-25658-3
- It Runs in the Family (2013) ISBN 978-0-312-62030-1
- Go Wild: Free Your Body and Mind from the Afflictions of Civilization (2014) ISBN 978-0-312-62030-1
- If It Sounds Good, It is Good (2020) ISBN 978-1-629-63792-1
