= Australia Wide =

Australian TV program

- Australia Wide Intertitle
- Genre: News, Current Affairs
- Presented by: Emma Renwick
- Country of origin: Australia
- Original language: English

Production
- Running time: 30 minutes

Original release
- Network: ABC2
- Release: 2005 – 1 July 2017

Australia Wide was a rural-focused half-hour soft news programme produced by the ABC in Sydney. The programme was, up until mid-2007, produced by the corporation's New Media and Digital Services division in Brisbane. It was shown weekdays on the digital-only channel ABC2 at 4.00pm, 7.00pm, and 7.30am, and can also be viewed at ABC Online.

The program follows a daily theme covering a range of topics and issues. Earth Works, shown on Mondays, focusses on the 'real world' and environment, Gen Next, shown on Tuesdays concentrates on the interests and issues of young people, especially those in rural areas. On Wednesdays the five winners of the 2005 "Video Lives" competition present video diaries of their lives and communities, while on Thursdays Arts About showcases the artistic talents and endeavours of Australians living in rural and regional areas. Outta Here on Fridays follows sport and recreational activities.

Content for the program comes from a number of sources, including reports from state and territory ABC News bulletins, reports from programs on the Australia Network, and ABC Local Radio presenters. Over summer, Australia Wide Summertime screens 10 minutes of news and weather and replaces the second section with short documentaries from a variety of sources, shown only on ABC2.

== History ==
Australia Wide stemmed from ABC Local Radio's Radio Pictures program, in which local radio presenters from rural Western Australia were given video equipment and training to produce local stories. This program produced a four-part series for ABC TV in 1998. In 2000, it was intended that the concept would be turned into a regular program, shown on ABC TV. A pilot was produced, however the series did not go ahead.

Video equipment was still given to a number of additional Local Radio studios, along with training and additional staffing hours. A few more short series of "Radio Pictures" were produced, and video appeared on ABC Online. In 2003, the regular series idea was turned into the week-daily "Australia Wide", also including content from regular ABC News reports. It ran for fifteen minutes and was only available on ABC Online, produced by the ABC's New Media and Digital Services division in Brisbane.

In March 2005, ABC2 launched, and Australia Wide became available to a wider audience. ABC ran a competition in late 2005 called "Video Lives" to find new documentary making talent. Following a restructure of the ABC in 2007, production was moved from Brisbane to Sydney, where the program was to be produced by the corporation's News and Current Affairs division.

There have been a number of presenters over the years, including Kerrin Binnie and Emma Renwick.

On 6 August 2016 Yassmin Abdel-Magied presented the show for the first time, and continued in this role until the cancellation of the show following the ABC restructure was announced in late May 2017, with the last episode to be aired on 1 July.
