= ABC Family (Australian TV channel) =

Australian public television channel

- Logo used since 2024
- Type: Older children's programming • Family programming
- Country: Australia
- Broadcast area: In every coverage
- Network: ABC Television

Programming
- Language: English
- Picture format: 576i SDTV

Ownership
- Owner: Australian Broadcasting Corporation
- Sister channels: ABC TV; ABC TV HD; ABC Kids; ABC Entertains; ABC News; ABC Australia

History
- Launched: 7 March 2005; 21 years ago (as ABC2)
- Former names: ABC2 (2005–2017); ABC Comedy (2017–2020); ABC TV Plus (2021–2024)

Links
- Website: www.abc.net.au/tv

Availability

Terrestrial
- ABN Sydney (DVB-T): 546/674 @ 12 (226.5 MHz)
- ABV Melbourne (DVB-T): 562/690 @ 12 (226.5 MHz)
- ABQ Brisbane (DVB-T): 578/706 @ 12 (226.5 MHz)
- ABS Adelaide (DVB-T): 594 @ 12 (226.5 MHz)
- ABW Perth/Mandurah (DVB-T): 738 @ 12 (226.5 MHz)
- ABT Hobart (DVB-T): 626 @ 8 (191.5 MHz)
- ABD Darwin (DVB-T): 642 @ 30 (543.5 MHz)
- Freeview: 22 (shared with ABC Kids)

Streaming media
- ABC iview live stream (Available to Australian viewers only)

ABC Family is an Australian free-to-air television channel owned by the Australian Broadcasting Corporation and part of its ABC Television network. The channel broadcasts a range of family and teen entertainment programming. The channel operates between the hours of 7:30pm and 4:00am AEST/AEDT daily. The channel's bandwidth is used for the ABC Kids channel for young children during the remaining hours of the day. There are also shows for older kids broadcast on the ABC Entertains channel.

The channel was launched on 7 March 2005 as ABC2. It was rebranded as ABC Comedy on 4 December 2017, with a format focused on comedy programming. On 1 January 2021, it was rebranded as ABC TV Plus and returned to a general entertainment format. In May 2024, it was announced that the channel would rebrand as ABC Family on 3 June 2024, with general entertainment being moved to the new ABC Entertains.

== History ==
=== Origins ===
The history of the channel can be traced back to 1998 when the Australian Broadcasting Authority released a report, titled Digital Terrestrial Television Broadcasting, recommending that the Australian Government support the early introduction of digital broadcasting as a free-to-air service with the loan of a 7 MHz channel for each broadcaster. The Australian Broadcasting Corporation stated that it wished to run up to four multichannels at different times of the day or alternatively offer a high-definition television channel. The corporation claimed that up to A$100 million would be needed to prepare for these services, half of which would need to be government-funded.

In August 2001 the Australian Broadcasting Corporation launched the ABC Kids channel, with Fly TV following in November 2001. The two multichannels, available only through digital terrestrial television, broadcast a range of programming targeted at younger and teenage viewers. Funding issues meant that, in June 2003, ABC Television closed ABC Kids and Fly TV.

Unlike its predecessors, ABC2 launched on 7 March 2005 on channel 21, independent of government funding, instead running on a budget of A$3 million per year. The first programme in the launch schedule was an episode of Landline – although scheduled to begin at 6.25am, the programme was delayed ten minutes. The channel was officially inaugurated by former Minister for Communications, Senator Helen Coonan, at the Australian Parliament House in Canberra on 10 March 2005.

=== Late 2000s ===
Weekly video gaming and technology programme Good Game was launched on 19 September 2006, becoming one of the first programmes in its genre to be broadcast on free-to-air television in Australia. Similarly in the same year, programmes produced included Australia Wide, Short and Curly, dig TV and Late Night Legends.

Genre restrictions imposed by the Australian government on digital multichanneling were lifted along with the media ownership laws passed through the Australian parliament on 18 October 2006. Previously limited in the subjects it could cover, ABC2 was henceforth able to carry shows identified as comedy, drama, national news, sport or entertainment.

On 1 January 2008 the Australian Broadcasting Corporation announced the introduction of live coverage and programme content on ABC2 from the Australian Film Commission, Opera Australia, and the Australian Ballet.

On 8 February 2008 ABC2 was rebranded with a new slogan and yellow-coloured logo, complementing the new ABC TV logo, which was concurrently revamped as ABC1. The channel also moved from channel 21 to channel 22. The rebrand was intended to capture a younger audience than ABC1, along with programming shifts bringing across original shows such as the popular Good Game and controversial Double the Fist.

On 4 December 2009, coinciding with the launch of the new youth multichannel ABC3, the children's programming block on ABC2 was relaunched as ABC For Kids on 2, and shifted its positioning to focus exclusively on preschool programmes.

=== 2010s ===
With new channel controller Stuart Menzies (formerly of ABC TV documentaries) joining in July 2010, ABC2 continued as a children's channel in the daytime, changing over to adult programmes at 7:00pm (originally 6:00pm until January 2011).

In May 2011, the channel's children's block was rebranded as ABC 4 Kids, and began to be treated as a separate channel timesharing in ABC2's bandwidth.

On 30 October 2017, it was announced by the ABC that on 4 December 2017, ABC2 would be rebranded as ABC Comedy, ending the use of the ABC2 name after 12 years, and focus on a range of comedy programming supplemented with repeats of popular ABC TV programmes. With this announcement, the channel also moved up its start time to 7:30pm instead of 7pm.

=== 2020s ===
On 25 November 2020, it was announced at the ABC's 2021 upfronts that ABC Comedy would be rebranded as ABC TV Plus and return to a general entertainment format on 1 January 2021.

On 1 January 2023, ABC TV Plus moved its startup time up an hour from 7:30pm to 6:30pm, led as before with Spicks and Specks; the broadcaster cited "audience research which shows our co-viewing family audience with older children grows around that time of day". The move garnered criticism from parents who were familiar with the 7:30pm closedown time for ABC Kids; due to viewer feedback, the startup time moved to 7pm on 6 February 2023, and then reverted to 7:30pm on 13 February.

On 9 May 2024, it was announced that ABC TV Plus would rebrand as ABC Family on 3 June, with a focus on family co-viewing.

== Programming ==
ABC Family is required by charter to meet certain programming obligations.

=== Current programming ===
- Back in Time for Dinner
- BTN Newsbreak
- Expedition With Steve Backshall
- Deadly Mission: Shark
- Dragon Ball Super
- Fresh Off the Boat
- Good Game: Spawn Point
- Hard Quiz Kids
- The InBESTigators
- Little Lunch
- Matilda and the Ramsay Bunch
- MythBusters
- Officially Amazing
- Operation Ouch!
- Shaun The Sheep
- Star Wars: Young Jedi Adventures
- Style It Out!
- The Crystal Maze
- The Secret Life of Our Pets
- The Strange Chores

=== News and Current Affairs (2005–2010) ===
To allow automated operation of the channel without the complications of the variable length of live news broadcasts, prior to the launch of the ABC News 24 channel, the channel broadcast hourly ABC News updates titled News in Brief produced for ABC Online. The channel also launched the morning show, ABC News Breakfast, on 3 November 2008, a three-hour news program running every weekday. The program no longer airs on the channel but is simulcast on ABC TV and the ABC News channel.

The channel also previously ran ABC Asia Pacific News, which is produced for ABC Australia.

In May 2011, with the move of ABC News Breakfast to ABC1, children's programming was relocated to ABC2 and ABC3.

An overnight ABC News Update which was replayed from the ABC News channel was formerly the last televised program to be played before the channel's overnight closure, until its rebrand to ABC Family in June 2024.

=== Sport (2005–2017) ===
The channel formerly broadcast exclusive national coverage of many sporting competitions, which include the New South Wales Rugby Union, Queensland Rugby League, Victorian Football League, South Australian National Football League, West Australian Football League, and the Northern Territory Football League. The Women's National Basketball League and W-League Women's Football Competition was broadcast live every week. In addition the channel also broadcast the Fed Cup and the Tiwi Islands Football League Grand Final annually.

== Availability ==
ABC Family is available on all of ABC Television's terrestrial television transmitters in 576i SD Digital, as well as on most satellite and cable services.

ABC Family does not broadcast 24 hours a day. From 4am to 7:30pm daily, the channel's bandwidth is used for the ABC Kids channel. ABC Family's programming commences at 7:30pm daily and closes at 4am, which is the same time that ABC Kids' programming starts.

== Logo and branding history ==
The channel launched with a three-dimensional logo of the numeral two. The previous idents were produced in part by Amanda Dennis (known for her work on Australia Wide, and Good Game), and were used in some form since the channel's launch, until the 2008 rebrand. The channel's original slogan was "More Choice, More Often". All promos featured the "Big 2" placed in famous, and iconic Australian locations, such as Sydney Harbour, the Melbourne Convention & Exhibition Centre and the Northern Territory. The "Big 2" was somewhat similar to the on air mascot of BBC Two in appearance. ABC2's logo was modified for the promotion of the channels launch, and for various sporting events, notably the channel's launch, where the logo appeared under-construction, and during the promotion of Australians Women's Netball where it took on the appearance of a netball.

On 8 February 2008, ABC2 updated to a yellow logo, and slogan to "Connecting 2", as well as moving its digital terrestrial broadcast from Channel 21 to Channel 22. In addition to this, the slogan "More Choice, More Often" was replaced with "Connecting 2". After concerns in some sections of the media that the 43-year-old Lissajous curve brand was to disappear completely, ABC management reaffirmed that it would remain in use by the corporation. On 1 April 2011 the logo was rebranded to look similar to that of the logo used by the ABC channel (then ABC1), and the ABC2 slogan was replaced with "Always Brighter". On 20 July 2014 following the main channel's rebrand to the 1974 Lissajous curve logo, new variants of the ABC2 logo were introduced to fit with the classic Lissajous curve. However, the 2011 logo remained in use on-screen with it and the 2014 variant used interchangeably.

On 4 December 2017, after 12 years of being known as ABC2, the channel underwent a major rebranding and was renamed ABC Comedy.

On 1 January 2021, the channel was rebranded again to be known as ABC TV Plus. This would last until 2024, when in May, it was announced that the channel would rebrand as ABC Family from 3 June 2024.

7 March 2005 – 8 February 2008

8 February 2008 – 31 March 2011

1 April 2011 – 3 December 2017

4 December 2017 – 31 December 2020

1 January 2021 – 2 June 2024

3 June 2024 – present

== See also ==
- Children's programming on ABC Television
