= Eureka Stockade Monument =

Coordinates: 37°33′55″S 143°53′09″E

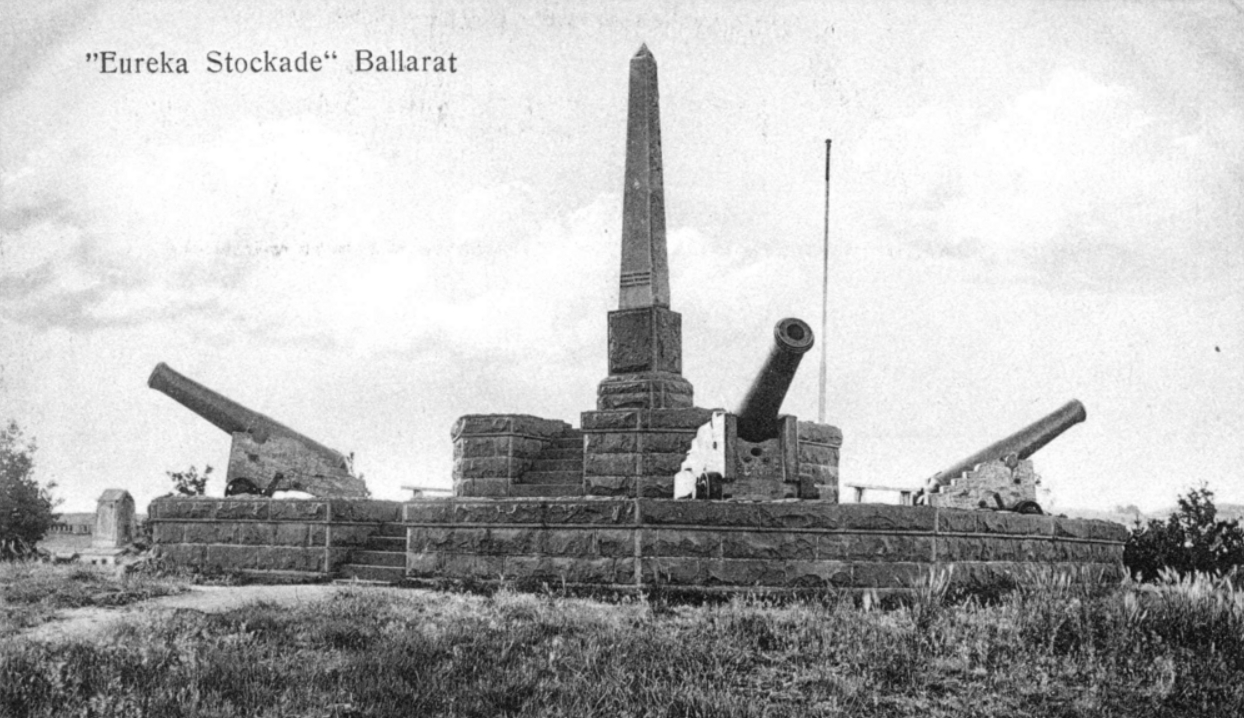
The Eureka Stockade Monument in Ballarat, erected in 1884.

The Eureka Stockade Monument is situated at the presumed site of the Battle of the Eureka Stockade. It is located on the Eureka Stockade Memorial Park in Ballarat, Victoria. A public meeting was held on 16 April 1884 to discuss the construction of a permanent monument in honour of the event. A. T. Morrison was the founding honorary secretary and treasurer. It was reported on 31 May that 200 pounds had been raised and four 64-pounder cannons were supplied by the defence minister, Sir Fredrick Sargood.

== Bibliography ==
- Corfield, Justin; Wickham, Dorothy; Gervasoni, Clare (2004). The Eureka Encyclopedia. Ballarat: Ballarat Heritage Services. ISBN 978-1-87-647861-2.
