= Eureka Stockade Memorial Park =

Site of the Battle of the Eureka Stockade

Coordinates: 37°33′55″S 143°53′05″E

The Eureka Stockade Memorial Park (also known as the Eureka Stockade Reserve) is believed to encompass the site of the Battle of the Eureka Stockade that was fought in Ballarat, Victoria, Australia, on 3 December 1854. Records of "Eureka Day" ceremonies at the site of the battle go back to 1855. In addition to the Eureka Stockade Monument, there are other points of interest in the reserve, including the Eureka Stockade Gardens and an interpretative centre. There was formerly a swimming pool and other structures. There has been a nearby caravan park since the 1950s. The present Eureka Stockade Memorial Park Committee has undergone several name changes since 1922.

The exact dimensions and location of the Eureka Stockade are a matter of debate among scholars.

== History ==
Following an earlier meeting on 22 November 1855 held at the location of the stockade where calls for compensation were made, Raffaello Carboni returned to the rebel burial ground for the first anniversary of the battle and remained for the day selling copies of his self-published memoirs. The following year, for the second anniversary, veteran John Lynch gave a speech as several hundred people gathered at the Eureka lead before a march to the local cemetery to remember the fall of the Eureka Stockade. There was a collection to provide for railing for the Eureka burial ground. In 1857, the anniversary was much more low-key and was marked by "some of the friends of those who fell to decorate their tombs with flowers ... the occasion will be passed over without any public demonstrations". By 1858, at the appointed time, there was only a crowd of seven people at the cemetery, two of whom were journalists. The Ballarat Star report "deplored the general lack of interest and neglected condition of the graves".

In the late 1860s, after lobbying by locals, the mayor of Ballarat East, Emanuel Steinfeld, requested that the state government proclaim a reserve around the area where the Eureka Stockade was erected. Following a formal request to the District Surveyor in November 1869, the Town Clerk identified an area of land that was officially gazetted in April 1870.

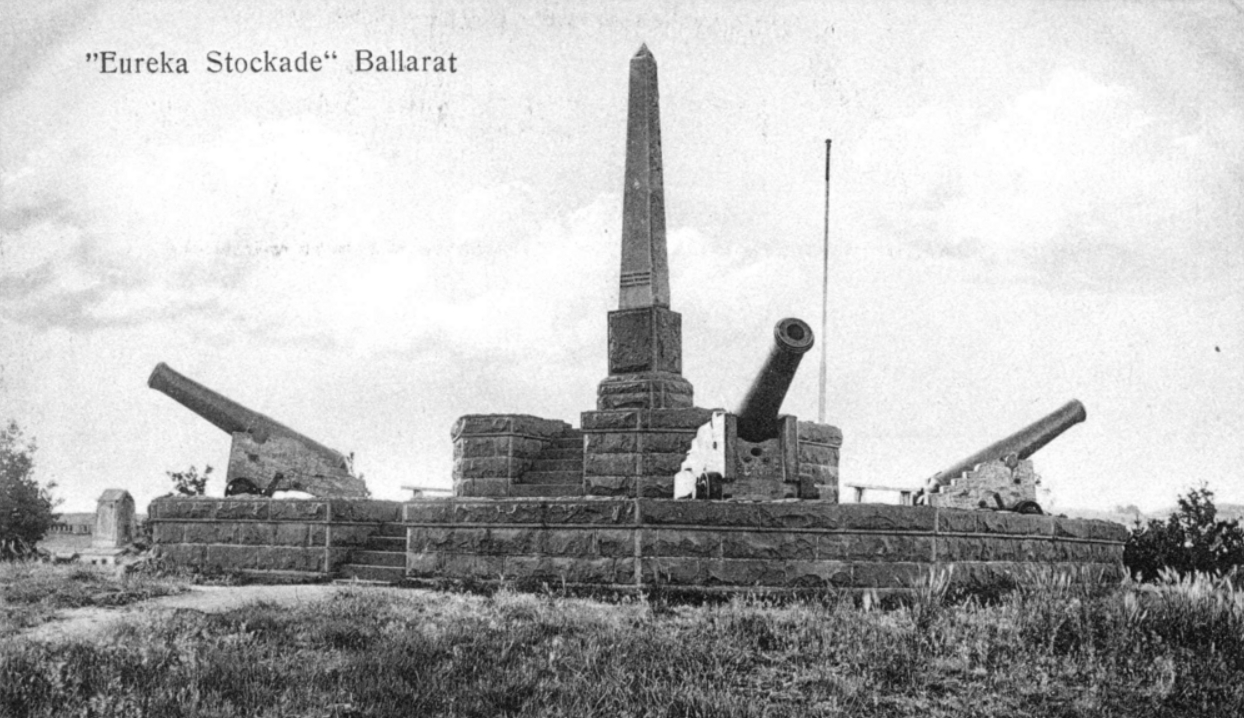
The Eureka Stockade Monument in Ballarat, erected in 1884

The national heritage listed Eureka Stockade Monument was inaugurated in 1884. A meeting was held at the partially completed monument on 3 December 1884. It appears there were no further gatherings there until the 50th-anniversary commemorations in 1904.

Until 1885, the site was known as the "Eureka Street Stockade Reserve". That year, it was officially gazetted as the "Eureka Park and Garden" and made the responsibility of the Ballarat East Council.

In the sesquicentenary year, there was a procession on Sunday, 4 December 1904, from Sturt Street to the Eureka Stockade Reserve. The Ballarat Star estimated a crowd of 15,000 heard several speeches delivered at the monument. The Star reported there were 50 Eureka Stockade veterans in Ballarat for the 50th anniversary, ranging in age from 70 to 86.

Frank Penhalluriack convened a meeting at the Ballarat East Town Hall on 7 February 1912, attended by forty-seven people concerned about the poor state of the Eureka Stockade Reserve.

In 1913 there was a statement of "Objects" adopted as follows:

a.To create a national spirit and patriotism by enlisting the sympathy of the Government and Citizens of the Commonwealth;

b.The annual celebration of the fight for liberty which took place at eureka on 3 December 1854;

c. the beautification and maintenance of the Eureka Stockade Reserve.

In 1917, a fountain was named after donor Major Levy. It is situated between the main Eureka Street entrance and the Eureka Memorial.

In 1926, the Eureka Hall on Stawell Street, Ballarat East, was constructed by the park committee. The Helen McKay Memorial Gates and Fence were later erected in 1953.

In 1935, the previous reservation orders were revoked. The reserve was henceforth proclaimed as the Eureka Stockade Reserve. It was to be the site for a public park and recreation. The reserved area was 13 acres, three roods and two perches. It included a closed portion of Rodier Street under the responsibility of the Ballarat City Council.

In 1970, local Rotary Clubs built a timber diorama on the reserve.

In 1983, a total of 3800 square metres of land was added to the reserve along its northern boundary. This was necessitated by the re-alignment of Charlesworth Street and the local council's compulsory acquisition of lot 18A in 1978.

In 1998, part of the railway land was surrendered to the Crown, and a further 1511 square metres was added along the western perimeter.

=== Eureka Stockade Memorial Park Committee ===
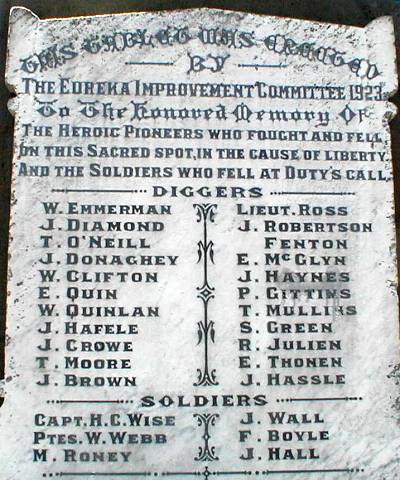
Battle of the Eureka Stockade honour roll

The present Eureka Stockade Memorial Park Committee dates from 1972. It was formerly known as the Eureka Stockade Committee Ballarat (1913), the Eureka Stockade Progress Association (1917), and the Eureka Stockade Improvement and Progress Association (1922). The most recent revision was in response to the Eureka Stockade Reserve being renamed the Eureka Stockade Memorial Park.

=== The Lone Pine ===
The Lone Pine Memorial Tree was planted at Eureka Stockade Memorial Park on 8 August 1917 by the Eureka Committee. It was dedicated in memory of the ANZACs who died in the Lone Pine charge at Gallipoli on that day in 1915. The accompanying plaque reads: "The Lone Pine - this tree was planted on Aug 8th 1917 by the Eureka Committee in memory of Australian soldiers who fell in the Lone Pine Charge at Gallipoli on Aug 8th 1915.

=== Eureka Swimming Pool ===
In the summer of 1932, the Reserve grew in popularity when permission was granted for recreational swimming in Lake Elsworth. In 1935, the lake became a swimming pool. It came at a cost of 20,000 pounds for grading the reserve and digging the pool, with the Eureka Reserve Committee paying for all materials used. It was officially opened on 21 January 1935.

In 1953, a footbridge leading to an island in the centre of the lake was installed.

The swimming pool was used until 1964 when considerable faecal matter was discovered in the unchlorinated water, and immersion was forbidden as possibly hazardous.

In the 1970s, the progress committee raised a total of $80,000 to construct a 50-metre concrete swimming pool and a learner's pool. These pools replaced the former Lake Elsworth recreational pool. In November 1971, the tender of $93,887 was accepted from W.B. Trahar Pty Ltd to build the Eureka Stockade Swimming Pool.

=== Eureka Stockade centres (1994 – present) ===
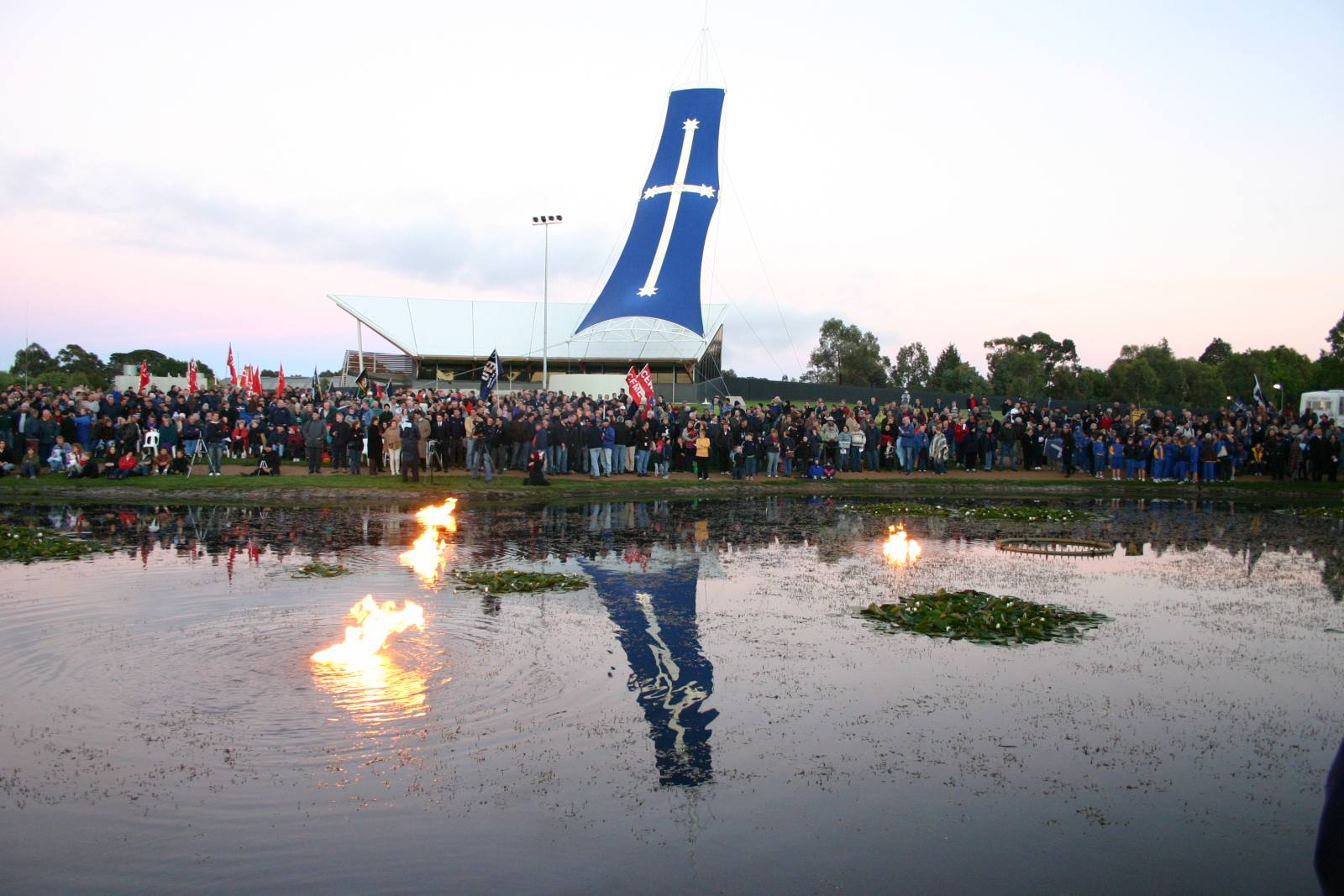
The sesquicentenary commemorations at the Eureka Centre, 3 December 2004

A purpose-built interpretation centre was erected at the cost of $4 million in March 1998 in the suburb of Eureka near the Eureka Stockade memorial. Designed to be a new landmark for Ballarat, it was known as the Eureka Stockade Centre and then the Eureka Centre. The building originally featured an enormous sail emblazoned with the Eureka Flag. Before its development there was considerable debate over whether a replica or reconstruction of wooden structures was appropriate. However, it was eventually decided against, and this is seen by many as a reason for the apparent failure of the centre to draw significant tourist numbers. Due primarily to falling visitor numbers the "controversial" Eureka Centre was redeveloped between 2009 and 2011. In 2013 it was relaunched as the Museum of Australian Democracy at Eureka with the aid of a further $5 million in funding from both the Australian and Victorian governments and $1.1 million from the City of Ballarat. The centrepiece of MADE's collection was the "King" fragments of the Eureka Flag made available on loan from the Art Gallery of Ballarat, that represent 69.01% of the original specimen. In 2018, the City of Ballarat council resolved to assume responsibility for managing the facility. MADE was closed and since being reopened has been called the Eureka Centre Ballarat.

=== Former structures ===
There was once a brick kiosk at the park. It was built at a cost of 400 pounds that was met by the Eureka Stockade Memorial Park Association. The building was closed in 1972 after another kiosk was opened at the nearby Olympic swimming pool. It was then utilised as a barbecue shelter until its demolition around 1978.

=== Nearby facilities ===
The Eureka Caravan Park came about in 1950 when land at the northeast of the reserve became available when the railway branch closed to become the Eureka Tiles factory.

== Debate over the exact dimensions and location of the Eureka Stockade ==
The exact site of the Eureka Stockade itself remains a mystery. The materials used to build the timber stockade were rapidly transported to the mines. Due to ongoing mining activity, the site of the battle was so extensively transformed that the original landscape became unrecognisable, making pinpointing the historical location of the stockade virtually impossible. Various studies have been undertaken that have arrived at different conclusions. Jack Harvey (1994) has conducted an exhaustive survey and has concluded that the Eureka Stockade Monument is situated within the confines of the historical Eureka Stockade.

It encompassed an area said to be one acre; however, that is difficult to reconcile with other estimates that have the dimensions of the stockade as being around 100 feet (30 m) x 200 feet (61 m). Contemporaneous descriptions and representations vary and have the stockade as either rectangular or semi-circular. Harvey believes the existing evidence points to a semi-circular stockade that occupied an area of three acres.

=== High treason trial map (1855) ===
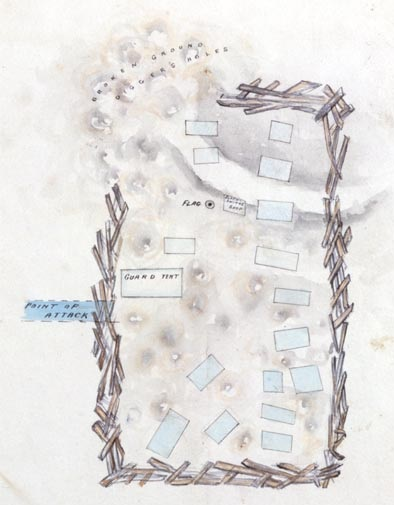
An exhibit in the 1855 Victorian high treason trials being a plan of the Eureka Stockade

The only known contemporary map showing the stockade's geographical location was exhibited at the trials. It was prepared before the first trial in February 1855. Based on W. S. Urquhart's 1852 survey, the map reveals that the stockade was erected on the edge of "Urquhart's diggings", more commonly referred to as the gravel pits. It contains the dated signatures of Redmond Barry (four times), and on the reserve side, there is a cartoon figure and the words "one of the volunteers" and William a Beckett's initials "W.A.B.". At the trials, Amos, Webster, Langley, Hackett and Richards all agreed that the map exhibit was generally true and correct. It features the route of the besieging forces, and two of the aforementioned witnesses have used a pencil to make relevant points. Commissioner Amos wrote "Bakery" for Bakery Hill and "E" for the police outpost, which Captain Thomas estimated to be 440 yards from the stockade. The camp in the trial map is 428 yards from the stockade. Another witness has made two notations concerning the arrest of Timothy Hayes near the stockade after the battle. The artist shows the Eureka Stockade built over a track. Government surveyor Thomas Burr, draftsman James Gaunt, and Eugene Bellairs, whose party was fired upon from the area a couple of days prior, all knew the location of the stockade but were not examined as to the fidelity of the trial map when called as witnesses. Concerning the trial map, Attorney General William Stawell told the jury in the trial of John Joseph that:

A plan has been prepared to enable you to understand the description more accurately. This stockade encompassed three sides of a parallelogram, leaving one end completely open, and it enclosed a number of tents; some of those tents were vacated at once, but in others some of the men remained, some of them sympathising with those men...

Ian MacFarlane notes that the defence counsels never directly called the accuracy of the trial map into question. However, they did request that "stricter evidence of its accuracy should be given by the survey officer who made it".

=== William Withers (1860) ===
In the 1870 edition of his seminal local history of Ballarat, William Withers published claims he made in a lecture ten years earlier that:

It was an area of about an acre, rudely enclosed with slabs, and situated at the point where the Eureka Lead took its bend by the old Melbourne road, now called Eureka street...The site...lay about midway between what are now Stawell and Queen streets on the east and west, and close to Eureka street on the south...

=== Bert and Bon Strange (1973) ===
In 1973, Bert and Bon Strange published Eureka: Gold, Graft and Grievances where the authors concluded that the Eureka Stockade was located between Rodier and Belford Streets a distance of 300 metres west of the present Eureka Stockade Monument.

=== Bob O'Brien (1974) ===
Another local Ballarat amateur historian, Bob O'Brien, proposed in 1974 that the exact location of the stockade is 450 metres west of the Eureka Stockade Monument.

=== Jack Chisolm (1974) ===
Cr Jack Chisolm, president of the Ballaarat Historical Society, prepared a paper in May 1974 to stimulate discussion on the site of the Eureka Stockade Monument. He tentatively reached the conclusion that "personally, I am inclined to the view that Rodier St is nearer the exact site". The historical society convened a forum the following year where similar views were expressed, with Chisholm reiterating that he "considered the site to be only a short distance away from the present one [i.e. the monument]".

=== Weston Bate (1974-1993) ===
Professor Weston Bate attended the 1974 Ballaarat Historical Society forum on the location of the Eureka Stockade and stated that he "tentatively placed the stockade west of the area where the present monument stands, but not so far west as Messers. O'Brien, Strange and Millett". In a submission to the Victorian Archaeological Society in 1983, he stated that the most likely location of the stockade was "between a point 50 metres east of Rodier St and a point 50 metres east of Belford St." However in 1993 Bate, in consideration of further evidence, stated "To my mind, the contemporary contour map used by Mr Harvey to pinpoint the gully running up to the stockade is the clincher".

=== John Parker (1993) ===
In April 1993, in response to submissions from Bob O'Brien, among others, John Parker, Victorian Surveyor-General and Director of Mapping, said that:

taking particular attention to (sic) a report dated 1884 in which the general belief of the day was that the proposed site was to be about 200 yards east of the stockade ... I have little doubt that the battle took place within an area bounded on the south by Eureka Street, on the west by Belford St, on the north by Crown allotment of section 81A and on the east by a line 200 metres west of and parallel to Stawell Street

This area is a parallelogram of approximately 200 metres by 100 metres centred on Rodier Street.

=== Jack Harvey (1994) ===
Jack Harvey published his exhaustive survey in 1994 and concluded that:

The area enclosed by the stockade almost certainly extended southwards over Eureka St and may have extended eastwards across the line of Stawell St. In my view, there is a high probability that the stockade encompassed the point on which the monument stands.

Key to his argument is that examination of maps and plans of Ballarat dating from the 1850s and 1860s reveals:

a gully ran straight from below where the monument stands in the south east corner of the Reserve to the rear of the Free Trade Hotel at the north west corner.

Harvey also cites the lack of any debate over the location of the Eureka Stockade Monument around the time of the 50th anniversary commemorations in 1904.

=== Ian MacFarlane (1995) ===
Based on an examination of the trial map, Ian MacFarlane has concluded that the government forces could have reached the Eureka Stockade in complete silence in one hour if it was located as shown near the gravel pits. However, he states it is debatable whether arriving at the 1993 historic precinct, unless by road, within that time is possible.

=== Battlefield Archaeology ===
Weston Bate considered whether battlefield archaeology might shed any light on the question. He concludes that it is not feasible and the results will be inclusive due to "the ephemeral nature of the stockade, the subsequent major disturbances of the ground in the area by mining and other activities, and the extent of the excavations required".

In 1991, the Officer in Charge, Historical Archaeology Unit, Victoria Archaeology Survey, stated that whilst any ground disturbances in and around the Eureka Stockade Memorial Park should be investigated for evidence of the Eureka Stockade, "an excavation to settle the issue is not warranted".

== See also ==
- Eureka Stockade Monument, raised in 1884 at the presumed site of the battle
- Eureka, Victoria, suburb of Ballarat

== Bibliography ==
- Corfield, Justin; Wickham, Dorothy; Gervasoni, Clare (2004). The Eureka Encyclopedia. Ballarat: Ballarat Heritage Services. ISBN 978-1-87-647861-2.
- FitzSimons, Peter (2012). Eureka: The Unfinished Revolution. Sydney: Random House Australia. ISBN 978-1-74-275525-0.
- Harvey, Jack (1994). Eureka Rediscovered: In search of the site of the historic stockade. Ballarat: University of Ballarat. ISBN 978-0-90-802664-7.
- MacFarlane, Ian (1995). Eureka from the Official Records. Melbourne: Public Record Office Victoria. ISBN 978-0-73-066011-8.
- Withers, William (1999). History of Ballarat and Some Ballarat Reminiscences. Ballarat: Ballarat Heritage Service. ISBN 978-1-87-647878-0.
