= Montana Department of Environmental Quality =

State agency of Montana

Agency overview
- Formed: c. 1995
- Jurisdiction: Government of Montana
- Headquarters: 1520 E 6th Ave, Helena, MT 59601
- Agency executive: Chris Dorrington, Director
- Website: deq.mt.gov

The Montana Department of Environmental Quality is a state-level government agency in Montana. The agency was founded by the Montana Legislature in 1995 as the Montana Board of Environmental Review. It is responsible for monitoring air, water, energy, and mining standards, in addition to regulatory services.
