= Sudanese nationality law =

Sudanese Nationality Law

Sudanese National Legislature
- Long title: The Sudanese Nationality Act 1994, as amended by the Sudanese Nationality Act (Amendments) 2011 and 2018
- Enacted by: Government of Sudan
- Status: Current legislation

Sudanese nationality law is regulated by the Constitution of Sudan, as amended; the Sudanese Nationality Law, and its revisions; and various international agreements to which the country is a signatory. These laws determine who is, or is eligible to be, a national of Sudan. The legal means to acquire nationality, formal legal membership in a nation, differ from the domestic relationship of rights and obligations between a national and the nation, known as citizenship. Nationality describes the relationship of an individual to the state under international law, whereas citizenship is the domestic relationship of an individual within the nation. In Sudan, nationality is often equated with ethnicity, despite recognition of the legal definitions. Sudanese nationality is typically obtained under the principle of jus soli, i.e. by birth in Sudan, or jus sanguinis, born to parents with Sudanese nationality. It can be granted to persons with an affiliation to the country, or to a permanent resident who has lived in the country for a given period of time through naturalization.

== Acquisition of nationality ==
Nationality can be acquired in Sudan at birth or later in life through naturalization.

=== By birth ===
There are no statutory provisions for children born in Sudan who would otherwise be stateless to acquire Sudanese nationality. Those who acquire nationality automatically at birth include:

- Children born anywhere whose father is Sudanese; (Note: There are legal contradictions between the provisions of the Sudanese Nationality Law and the Constitution. The 1994 Nationality Law provided that nationality could only be acquired through male ancestry. Provisions in the 1998 Constitution granted an inalienable right to nationality through a father or a mother. The amended Nationality Law of 2005 allowed children to acquire nationality maternally by application, which contradicted the Interim Constitution that reiterated the inalienable right to nationality.)
- Persons who were residing in Sudan in 1994 and whose paternal ancestors were domiciled in Sudan on 1 January 1956; or
- Abandoned children or orphans discovered in the territory whose parents are unknown.

=== By naturalization ===
Naturalization can be granted to persons who have resided in the territory for a sufficient period of time to confirm they understand the customs and traditions of the society. General provisions are that applicants have good character and conduct; have no criminal convictions; have good mental and physical health; can legally be economically self-sufficient; and have resided in the country for ten years. Sudanese nationality law specifically excludes adoptees from acquiring nationality from their guardians. Besides foreigners meeting the criteria, other persons who may be naturalized include:

- Children born to a Sudanese mother and foreign father can submit an application to become a Sudanese national of origin; (Note: A report prepared by the Strategic Initiative for Women in the Horn of Africa in 2015, indicates that no procedures for such application are given and it is unclear if granting nationality is discretionary.)
- The wife of a Sudanese national after a two-year residency;
- Minor children can be automatically naturalized when their parent acquires nationality; or
- Persons who have gained presidential approval to naturalize do not have to meet any requirements.

== Loss of nationality ==
Sudanese nationals can renounce their nationality pending approval by the president. Nationals may be denaturalized in Sudan for serving a foreign government or in the military of another state without government authorization; for committing serious crimes, disloyal acts, or crimes against the state or state security; or for fraud, misrepresentation, or concealment in a naturalization petition. Re-acquisition of nationality that has been lost whether through renunciation or automatic loss by becoming South Sudanese, is at the discretion of the president.

== Dual nationality ==
Dual nationality has typically been allowed in Sudan since 1993, as long as the other nationality acquired is not for South Sudan.

== History ==
The inhabitants of Nubia, in the northern area of what is now Sudan, had a long history of trade and military conflict from ancient times. From 2450 BC to 1450 BC, the dominant kingdom in the area was the city-state of Kerma. Between 1650 and 1550 B.C. the Kingdom of Kush rose in the region, but was conquered by Egypt and colonized between 1550 and 1070 BC. Moving to Napata (now modern Karima, Sudan), the Kush Kingdom revolted against Egyptian rule and regained its independence in 950 BC and by 760 BC, the Kushites had established rule over Egypt as the Twenty-fifth Dynasty. In the 4th century BC, Meroë replaced Napata as the capital of the Kush Kingdom. The Ethiopian Kingdom of Aksum invaded Meroë around 350 AD, at which point it was abandoned. The next century was characterized as a period with small states with clear social hierarchy and the rise of the Christian kingdoms of Alodia, Makuria, and Nobadia. In 639, Arab forces conquered Egypt and Muslims began requiring inhabitants in Nubia to pay tribute. In 646, Arab forces directly attacked Nubia, but were repelled. In 652, Egypt and Nubia signed a peace treaty which provided that in exchange for an annual amount of Egyptian wine and Nubian slaves the two territories would not attack each other. The treaty would govern relations between Nubia and Egypt for the next six hundred years.

The area to the east of Lower Nubia and outside the control of Egypt and Nubia was inhabited by the Beja people. In 854, Arab forces from Qus invaded this territory making vassal states and prompting immigration from Arabia. They brought Islam into the region which slowly spread. Through intermarriage with the Beja and Nubian people, the society changed from matrilineal to patrilineal with the dominant culture being a mixture of Nubian and Arabic traditions. Egypt was conquered by the Fatimid Caliphate in 969, which sent an emissary to establish trade relations with Nubia. The trend over the next centuries was one of conflict with Muslims typically gaining territorial control. By the thirteenth century, Mamluk sultans began to invade the territory to bring it under the control of Egypt. In western Sudan, the Daju people gained control of an area near Darfur and were subsequently ousted by the Tunjur people in the early thirteenth century. A battle of 1276 near Dongola saw the Mamluks victorious and the Nubian ruler was forced to take an oath of allegiance to the Egyptian sultan. For the next years the Mamluk Sultanate extended its authority by invasion and the creation of vassal states in Nubia, and had conquered the last Christian kingdom in the region, Alodia, by the end of the fifteenth century.

=== Ottoman period (1517–1885) ===
In 1504, the Funj Sultanate arose as the dominant force in the area between Gezira and the Nile. In 1517, the Ottoman Empire annexed the Funj territory and in 1520 began to expand their territory southward into Nubia. In 1526, the Ottomans had gained control of the port at Suakin. The Sultanate expanded its control from the Nile Valley eastward to Itbay and westward to Kordofan, and controlled the area until 1821. In southern Sudan by the sixteenth century the Zande people had migrated to the area and established small communities, they were subjugated in the eighteenth century by the Avungara people. Also in the south, the Shilluk Kingdom arose to dominate the lower White Nile region. In the west, the Tunjur kingdom was replaced by the Sultanate of Darfur in the seventeenth century. From the mid-sixteenth century, Ottoman rule extend over eastern and northern Sudan and from 1820 Turkish Sudan had created a colonial administration which governed its territory and began efforts to bring the south under its rule. Within the Ottoman Empire, for six centuries, there was an internal organization that defined government functions for subjects by balancing religious and communal ties, weighing aptitudes and occupations without a centralized national ideology. Ottoman subjecthood was strongly tied to religion and non-Muslims, if they were ahl al-Kitāb (People of the Book), meaning Jewish, Christian, or Zoroastrian, could benefit from being subjects by agreeing to pay a tax to the sultan. Under a pact known as zimma, in exchange for paying taxes, the sultan allowed these subjects freedom of religion and guaranteed their lives, property, and rights with an understanding that they were legally entitled to less status than Muslim subjects. The pact was agreed to by the leaders of the confessional community, who managed the adherents and their internal organization under the religious law of their community.

By the eighteenth century a political organization, known as the millet, managed the affairs of their respective religious communities and developed into the protégé system (Turkish: beratlılar, protected persons). Signing treaties with European powers, from the 1673 signing of a Capitulation with France, the Ottoman Empire granted France control of certain Ottoman Christians, Austria control of some Ottoman Roman Catholics, most favoured nation status to British and Dutch traders, as well as specific rights to the Republic of Venice and Russian Empire. Under the terms of these treaties, foreign powers could recruit Ottoman subjects to serve their needs as commercial agents, consuls, or interpreters, and extend to these protégés diplomatic immunity from prosecution and privileges of trade, including lowered customs tariffs. Over time, abuses of the system led to a virtual monopoly of foreign trade by protégés, clandestine sales of letters patent (Turkish: berats), and demands from foreign powers for protection to extend from individuals to entire communities. The influence on Ottoman subjects by European powers changed the perception of these minority groups in the empire, meaning that they were increasingly seen not as Ottoman subjects, but as resident aliens.

In 1798, France and Britain's conflicts during the Napoleonic Wars extended into Egypt. France occupied the territory until 1801, when the French were defeated and Britain set about assisting the Ottoman Empire in regaining its sovereignty. To curb the disruptive effects of Europeans in the empire, from 1806, the Ottoman government began sending communiques to the foreign embassies demanding compliance with the terms of their agreements. Failing to achieve success diplomatically, in 1839, the Ottoman government issued the Edict of Gülhane, in an effort to end bribery and corruption, and to create fair tax schemes and institutions to protect the basic rights of Ottoman subjects. The Ottoman Reform Edict of 1856 (Turkish: Islâhat Fermânı) categorized subjects by whether they were Muslim or non-Muslim, granting different civil statuses to each. In 1863, new regulations upon protégés restricted the privileges they received in the empire and clarifying who were thereafter considered to be Ottoman subjects and who were foreigners.

The Khedivate of Egypt was established by 1867, and to further define subjects of the Ottoman Empire, new nationality legislation was passed in 1869 (tâbiiyet-i osmaniye kanunnamesi, Ottoman Nationality Law). (Note: Will Hanley, a history professor at Florida State University, notes that the etymology of tâbiiyet includes associations with allegiance, nationality, and subjecthood, or an affiliation to a sovereign, but does not translate as citizenship.) The law specified terms for the acquisition and loss of who was within the sovereignty of the empire, rather than the domestic obligations and rights of citizenship. It described who was a subject, owing allegiance, and made provisions for wives, children, emigrants and immigrants. Under its terms, children derived nationality from their fathers, foreigners born in the territory could acquire nationality at majority, and foreigners born elsewhere could obtain nationality after five years residency within the imperial realm. Specific provisions included that foundlings discovered within the territory; stateless persons living in the empire; Muslim women, who despite the ban on such marriages, had married Persian men and the children of such a union; unregistered persons who had not been counted in the Ottoman census, either because no census was taken or their births were unregistered, were all considered to be Ottoman. Foreign women acquired Ottoman nationality through marriage, but could return to their original nationality upon the death of their spouse. Nationality could also be granted based on special contribution or service to the nation. Dual nationality was permitted, but was discouraged, as the government could choose not to recognize naturalization of an Ottoman subject by another state. In the 1870s, a series of measures abolished slavery.

=== Mahdist State (1885–1898) ===
In 1881, Muhammad Ahmad began to build a following throughout the Sudan to purify the Islamic society and oust the Ottomans from the region. By 1885 he had defeated the Ottoman rulers and established a Muslim state with territory extending over much of what is now Sudan, prior to his death that year. His successor, Abdallahi ibn Muhammad borrowed administrative procedures from Egypt and established a stable Islamic state. However, slavery was reinstated as a means to stimulate the economy and appease merchants who had been involved in the trade. Local revolts and the threat of European encroachment on the Mahdist State were constant from its founding. At a conference held in Berlin between 1884 and 1885, European nations collaborated to establish spheres of influence during the Scramble for Africa. Determined to prevent the French from expanding in the area, an Anglo-Egyptian army invaded the state and defeated the Mahdists in 1898.

=== Anglo-Egyptian Sudan (1899–1956) ===
In 1899 an Anglo-Egyptian condominium was established to govern the territory. The government organization was to be based on Turco-Egyptian precedent. Though Britain and Egypt were to equally share authority, as Egypt was a British protectorate until 1922 the power sharing was not equal. Under the terms of the agreement the territory was not part of the crown's possessions, nor a protected state. Britain had no extraterritorial right to administer British subjects there and inhabitants were not British subjects. Similarly, Egyptian courts, decrees, and laws were invalid in Sudan and Ottoman sovereignty ceased. Sudanese were defined by the condominium agreement to be persons subject to the Anglo-Egyptian authority in the territory. The Ottoman government refused to recognize the condominium and protested the right of it Khedivate to sign agreements on behalf of the Ottoman Empire, as Britain had previously recognized Sudan as Ottoman territory and had made commitments to other nations, including France, that it would remain so. The Ottomans demanded that the British evacuate the area, but did not have strength to force the British to comply. The Governor-General, appointed by Egypt but with British approval, ruled according to martial law and was the sole authority for civil and military matters.

In southern Sudan, the Zande, Dinka, and Nuer peoples resisted the British with armed rebellion until the 1930s, seeking to regain the freedom they had held under the Mahdist state. The 1906 Closed Districts Ordinance required permits for both Sudanese and foreigners to control movements of people between the north and south. In 1922, Egypt gained its independence and withdrew its troops from Sudan. British troops remained in Sudan and the British crown continued to exercise extraterritorial jurisdiction in Egypt until 14 October 1949, when it was terminated by an Order in Council. With the rise of a Sudanese nationalist movement between 1924 and 1925, the British attempted to pacify the indigenous populations by adopting policies that aimed to protect each ethnic group from racial incompatibility with other ethnic groups. From this point, under the policies of indirect rule, north and south Sudan were administered separately and local governance was led by traditional leaders, who had the confidence of the British governors. For communities like the Dinka and Nuer, which had no political system of social hierarchy, the British appointed members of the priestly class and invested them with civil authority.

The Definition of Sudanese Ordinance was passed on 15 July 1948. It specified that stateless persons who had no nationality and were currently domiciled in Sudanese territory, who had lived or who had paternal ancestors who had been resident in Sudan since 31 December 1897 were Sudanese nationals, along with the children, wives, or widows of such persons. The British Nationality Act of that year, allowed persons who were in service to the Crown in Sudan to naturalize as British. It also allowed that some Sudanese who held a passport issued by the Governor-General of Sudan, though not actual British Protected Persons by statutory protection could be considered as if they were protected persons by royal prerogative. In 1949, representatives of Sudan, Egypt, and Britain drafted a constitution for limited self-rule. Though southern Sudanese did not agree with unifying the country, integration was implemented with the constitution when it went into effect in 1950. The Egyptian revolution of 1952 nullified the terms of the condominium and led to an Anglo-Egyptian resolution to grant Sudan self-government. Between 1953 and 1955, internal tensions escalated and the First Sudanese Civil War broke out in 1955. Nationalists declared their independence in 1955, forcing the drafting of a transitional constitution.

=== Post-independence (1956–2011) ===
In the midst of the conflict, Sudan as a unitary state, gained independence on 1 January 1956. As a result, Sudanese present in Sudanese territory were denaturalized by Egypt and automatically became Sudanese citizens. Concurrent with independence British recognition of Sudanese as prerogative protected persons ceased. The transitional constitution of 1956 contained no provisions to define who were Sudanese. The following year, the Law of Sudanese Nationality (Law No. 22) was passed. Similarly to the 1948 legislation, it provided that a person acquired Sudanese nationality by birth in the territory and resident from 31 December 1897 or if his father or direct paternal ancestors had been residents in Sudan on that date. Children born after independence acquired nationality by having a Sudanese father, regardless of whether the father was Sudanese born or naturalized. Naturalization was available to persons who had continuously resided in Sudan for ten years and were literate in Arabic and were willing to renounce other nationality or after a twenty-year residency lacking proficiency in Arabic. In the case of a wife of a Sudanese national, a two-year residency was required. Dual nationality was prohibited. The 1957 Nationality Law was amended in 1970 (Law No. 55) to change the effective date of residence to 1 January 1924 and again (Law No. 47) in 1972 changing the same date to 1 January 1956 (or 1957). (Note: There are discrepancies in sources regarding whether the effective date for conferral of nationality as defined in 1972 was at independence or upon the date the first Nationality Law went into effect.)

The Sudanese Civil War ended in 1972 with the signing of the Addis Ababa Accord granting limited autonomy to South Sudan. A new constitution was drafted in 1973, but nationality regulations were unchanged. In 1983, when the autonomy of the south was revoked, civil war reignited. The government was overthrown by a coup d'état in 1989. The military junta which had governed Sudan was replaced in 1993 by the Transitional National Assembly in 1993. The Transitional Assembly adopted a new Nationality Act (Provisional Decree No. 18) on 18 August 1993, which was amended and approved as Resolution 59 by the Transitional Assembly and signed into law by the President on 17 May 1994. Acquisition of nationality through paternity or the paternal line remained, the date for conferral of nationality returned to 1924 under the 1993 provisional decree but was set to correspond to independence day under the 1994 law, and dual nationality was authorized. The residency requirement for naturalization was reduced to five years (two for women who married Sudanese men) and the requirement to speak Arabic was eliminated, but applicants had to be of sound mental and physical health and of good character. The Act removed adoptees from the definition of children, meaning that adoptees could not derive the nationality of their adoptive parents. It also made provisions for foundlings whose parents were unknown to acquire Sudanese nationality.

Following the signing of the Khartoum Peace Agreement of 1997, a new constitution was drafted in 1998, which was intended to remove gender discrimination from the laws. Article 22 of the constitution provided that persons born to a Sudanese mother or father had an inalienable right to acquire nationality. Because the Nationality Act was not changed, a discrepancy existed between the constitutional provision for acquiring nationality maternally and the nationality law, which allowed only paternal acquisition. With the discovery of oil in South Sudan, the civil war resumed in 2001 and a laborious period of negotiation lapsed before the Machakos Protocol was signed to bring peace in 2005 in Nairobi, Kenya. The agreement provided that southern Sudan would be transitionally autonomous until a referendum to be held in 2011 determined if it would remain in the union or become independent. It created provisions for transitional governments to be elected and stipulated that Islamic law was not to be implemented in the south.

The 2005 Sudanese Interim National Constitution repeated the right for children to derive nationality maternally, whether born in the country or abroad, and acceptability of dual nationality. It specified that rules on naturalization were to be specified by legislation. The Nationality Law was amended that year and for the first time allowed a child to apply for nationality through their Sudanese mother, if their father was a foreigner. Unlike children born to Sudanese fathers, nationality was not automatically bestowed at birth. An Interim Constitution for southern Sudan was also drafted in 2005 to determine eligibility to vote in the referendum to consider independence, but because South Sudan was not independent had no provisions for nationality. In 2009, the Southern Sudan Referendum Act defined eligible voters to be persons who were eighteen years old or more; had legal capacity; were registered to vote; and were either born to parents or whose ancestors had links with indigenous or ethnic communities from Southern Sudan, who had resided in southern Sudan on or before 1 January 1956, or persons who had continuously been permanent residents or whose parents or grandparents had been continuous residents since 1 January 1956. Negotiations between the north and south were to establish how nationality would be implemented after the referendum was held, but talks broke down prior to the scheduled vote.

=== Post-Secession (2011–present) ===
On 9 January 2011, the result of the referendum was independence for South Sudan, which was to become effective on 9 July. Sudan agreed to accept the results of the vote and on 19 July 2011 passed an amendment to the Nationality Law of 1994 to automatically denaturalize persons who acquired the nationality of South Sudanese, whether by voluntary or involuntary means. It also provided that if a father lost his nationality by acquiring South Sudanese status, his children did as well. Simultaneously, it increased the residency period for naturalization to ten years. Though women married to South Sudanese partners did not automatically acquire South Sudanese nationality, the practice of the Sudanese Ministry of the Interior was to deprive them of their nationality, as well as prohibiting their children from gaining Sudanese nationality. In addition, based on the policy, if a husband could not prove his tie to South Sudan, he automatically became stateless and could be deprived of nationality, as were his children. A 2017 hearing in the Sudanese Supreme Court (re: case of Adel Bur'i Ramadan) ruled that as the constitution provides that children of a Sudanese mother have a right to nationality an opinion of the Ministry of Justice contradicting the Constitution was invalid. The decision further stated that if the mother had Sudanese nationality at the time an application was made the child could derive her nationality. In 2018 in response to the court decision, an amendment to the Nationality Law was enacted confirming that persons whose mother is Sudanese have a right to acquire her nationality regardless of the nationality of the father.
