= Richard J. Margolis =

American writer

- Born: June 30, 1929; St. Paul Minnesota
- Died: April 22, 1991; New Haven, Connecticut
- Occupations: Journalist, Poet, Children's book author
- Notable work: Wish Again, Big Bear, Secrets of a Small Brother, Risking Old Age in America

Richard J. Margolis (June 30, 1929 – April 22, 1991) was an American journalist, essayist, poet and children's book author. Throughout a long career as a freelance journalist, he wrote about a variety of social topics, including housing for the rural poor, racial issues, and the elderly.

== Background and career ==
After receiving an MA in Journalism from the University of Minnesota in 1952, Margolis worked for a few years as an advertising copywriter. In 1953, he married Diane Rothbard, and the couple moved to Brooklyn, NY, where they purchased and ran the Brooklyn Heights Press, a community newspaper. Margolis served as editor and main writer for the paper until 1959.

In 1961, he and his wife moved to Connecticut, where he launched his freelance writing career. Over the next 30 years, he wrote for a wide variety of publications, including The New York Times, The Washington Post, The Nation, The New Republic, Smithsonian, Working Papers, The Boston Globe, The Christian Science Monitor, Change, Harper's, Life, Redbook and Next. From 1968–1991, he had a regular column in The New Leader called States of the Union.

In addition to writing short articles, Margolis also wrote a number of long-form journalistic pieces. These included Something to Build On, a report about self-help housing published by the American Friends Service Committee (1969); All Their Days, All Their Nights, a prose poem about shack life in the United States published by the Rural Housing Alliance (1971); and Homes of the Brave, a report on migrant farm worker housing (1981).

Margolis served as literary editor of Change magazine (1973–80), contributing editor of Foundation News (1983–1988), an editorial board member of Human Services in the Rural Environment (1979–1991), a contributing editor to Rural Electrification, editor-in-chief of the monthly publication ruralamerica, (1977–79), editor-in-chief of The Cooperator (1972–73) and senior editor of Working Papers (1981).

In addition to his writing activities, Margolis was also active in several organizations. In 1969, he helped found the Rural Housing Alliance, and he served as its Chairman from 1969–1975. In 1972, he helped launch Rural America, a nonprofit advocacy organization based in Washington, D.C.

In 1983–84, he was a Fellow at the Harvard's Kennedy Institute of Politics in Cambridge, MA.

In 1990, his book about the elderly poor in the U.S., entitled Risking Old Age in America, was published by Westview Press.

== Poetry and children's books ==
In addition to his journalism career, Margolis also wrote poetry and children's books. His published works include:

- Only the Moon & Me (J.D. Lipincott, 1968) – Children's poetry
- Looking for a Place (J.D. Lipincott, 1969) – Youth poetry
- Wish Again, Big Bear (MacMillan, 1971) – Children's story
- The Upside-Down King (Windmill Books, 1971) – Children's book in verse
- Homer the Hunter (Macmillan, 1972) – Children's book
- Big Bear to the Rescue (Greenwillow Books, 1975) – Children's book
- Big Bear, Spare That Tree (Greenwillow Books, 1980) – Children's book
- Secrets of a Small Brother (Macmillan, 1984) – Poetry (winner of the Christopher Award in the Books for Young People category)

== Richard J. Margolis Award ==
Following his death in 1991, family and friends created the Richard J. Margolis award to promote nonfiction writers and promising journalists writing about social-justice issues. In addition to cash prizes, the award also offers the annual winner a one-month residency at the Blue Mountain Center in upstate New York.

== Personal life ==
Margolis was born in St. Paul, Minnesota on June 29, 1929. His father, Harry S. Margolis, was Rabbi of the Mount Zion Temple in St. Paul from 1925 till his death in 1946. Margolis had one brother, Philip M. Margolis (1925–2020), who became a psychiatrist and professor at the University of Michigan. In 1953, Margolis married Diane Rothbard and they had two sons, Harry (1955) and Philip (1957). His wife, Diane R. Margolis, (1933–) is a sociologist and author of several books, including The Managers: Corporate Life in America (1990), The Fabric of Self (1998), and We Built a Village: Cohousing and the Commons (2023).

Margolis died on April 22, 1991 from complications following a kidney transplant.
